= 1900–01 United States Senate elections =

- January 16, 1900 – March 28, 1901
- Class 2

30 of the 90 seats in the United States Senate (as well as special elections) 46 seats needed for a majority
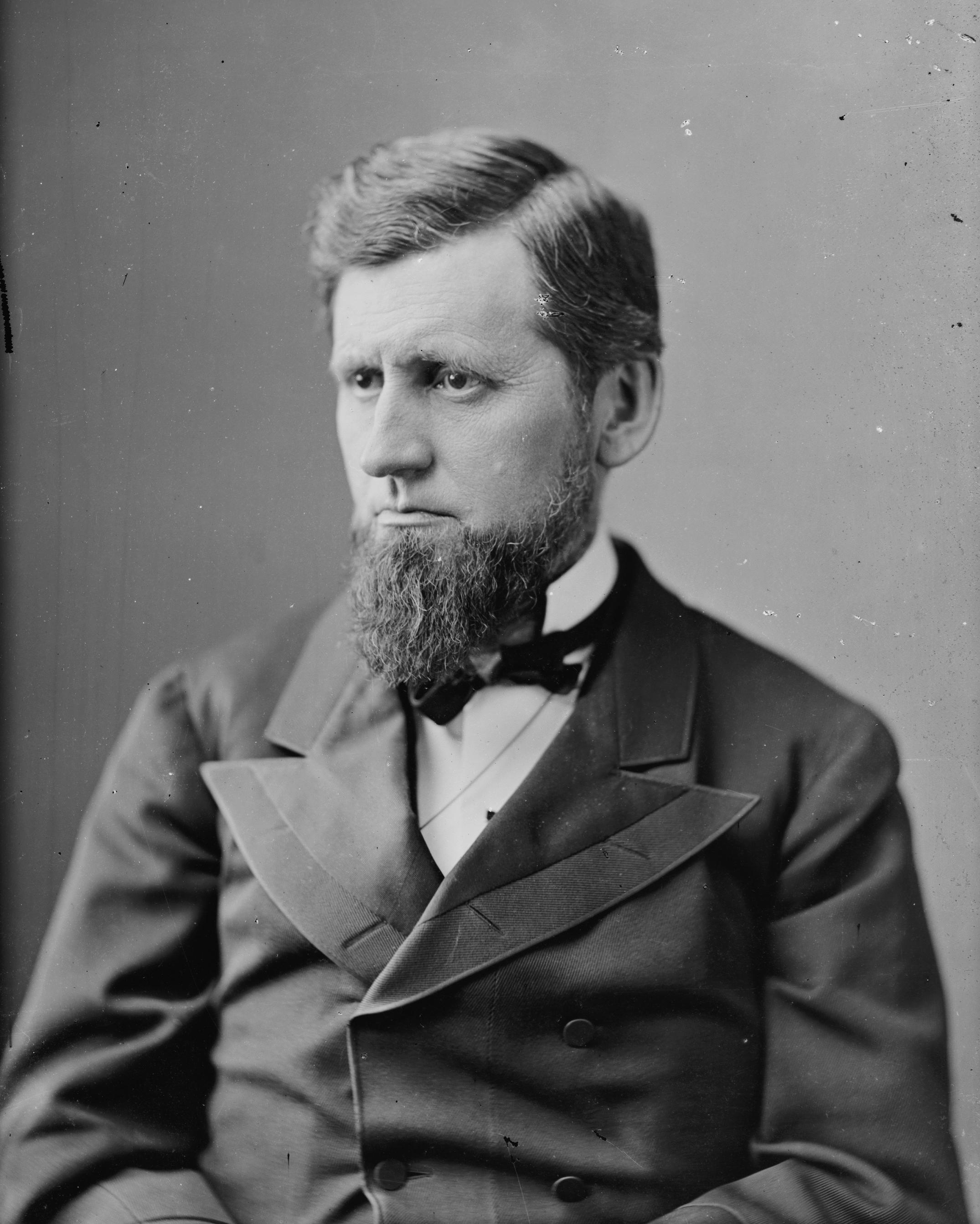

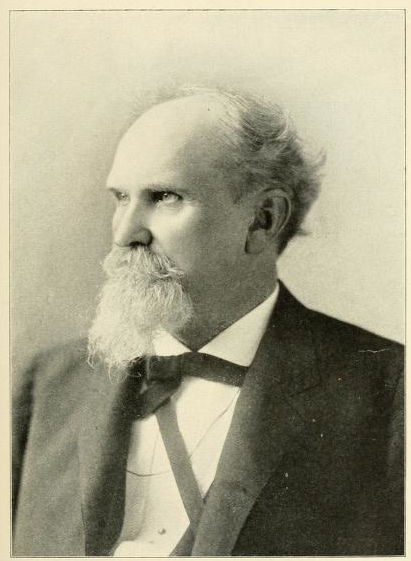
| | Majority party | Minority party |
|---|---|---|
| Leader | William B. Allison | James K. Jones |
| Party | Republican | Democratic |
| Leader since | March 4, 1897 | March 4, 1899 |
| Leader's seat | Iowa | Arkansas |
| Seats before | 53 | 27 |
| Seats after | 55 | 29 |
| Seat change | ▲2 | ▲2 |
| Seats up | 17 | 11 |
| Races won | 14 | 13 |
| | Third party | Fourth party |
| Party | Populist | Silver Republican |
| Seats before | 4 | 2 |
| Seats after | 2 | 2 |
| Seat change | ▼2 | Steady |
| Seats up | 1 | 1 |
| Races won | 0 | 1 |
| | Fifth party |
| Party | Silver |
| Seats before | 2 |
| Seats after | 2 |
| Seat change | Steady |
| Seats up | 0 |
| Races won | 0 |
- Results of the elections: Democratic gain Democratic hold Republican gain Republican hold Silver Republican gain Silver Republican hold Legislature failed to elect
Majority Party before election
Republican
Elected Majority Party
Republican

The 1900–01 United States Senate elections were held on various dates in various states, coinciding with President William McKinley's re-election as well as the 1900 House of Representatives elections. As these U.S. Senate elections were prior to the ratification of the Seventeenth Amendment in 1913, senators were chosen by state legislatures. Senators were elected over a wide range of time throughout 1900 and 1901, and a seat may have been filled months late or remained vacant due to legislative deadlock. In these elections, terms were up for the senators in Class 2.

Both the Republicans and the Democrats gained two seats at the expense of various third parties and vacancies. Special elections were held to fill vacant seats in Pennsylvania, Utah, and Montana (of which the Republicans won the two former and Democrats the latter) as well as to replace appointees in Minnesota, Nebraska, and Vermont (all of which were carried by the Republicans). Republicans flipped Democratic-held seats in Minnesota, as well as a Populist seat in Nebraska and a Silver Republican held seat in South Dakota. The Silver Republican Party kept itself to net neutral gain by flipping a Republican held seat in Idaho. The Democratic party, meanwhile, flipped Republican held seats in Montana and Colorado as well as a Populist held seat in North Carolina.

In Nebraska and Montana's special election, senators were elected shortly after the beginning of the 57th Congress on March 4. In Delaware, the legislature again failed to elect a candidate, leaving both senate seats vacant– the only time a state has gone without representation in the Senate since the first Congress.

== Results summary ==
Senate party division, 57th Congress (1901–1903)

- Majority party: Republican (55)
- Minority party: Democratic (29)
- Other parties: Populist (2); Silver Republican 2; Vacant 2
- Total seats: 90

== Change in Senate composition ==
=== Before the elections ===
At the beginning of 1900.

| | | | | | D_{1} | D_{2} | D_{3} | D_{4} | D_{5} |
| D_{15} | D_{14} | D_{13} | D_{12} | D_{11} | D_{10} | D_{9} | D_{8} | D_{7} | D_{6} |
| D_{16} Ran | D_{17} Ran | D_{18} Ran | D_{19} Ran | D_{20} Ran | D_{21} Ran | D_{22} Retired | D_{23} Retired | D_{24} Retired | D_{25} Retired |
| SR_{2} | SR_{1} | S_{1} | S_{2} | P_{1} | P_{2} | P_{3} | P_{4} | P_{5} Ran | D_{26} Retired |
| SR_{3} Ran | R_{51} Retired | R_{50} Unknown | R_{49} Ran | R_{48} Ran | R_{47} Ran | R_{46} Ran | R_{45} Ran | R_{44} Ran | V_{1} |
| Majority → | | | | | | | | R_{44} Ran | V_{2} |
| R_{36} Ran | R_{37} Ran | R_{38} Ran | R_{39} Ran | R_{40} Ran | R_{41} Ran | R_{42} Ran | R_{43} Ran | R_{44} Ran | V_{3} |
| R_{35} Ran | R_{34} | R_{33} | R_{32} | R_{31} | R_{30} | R_{29} | R_{28} | R_{27} | R_{26} |
| R_{16} | R_{17} | R_{18} | R_{19} | R_{20} | R_{21} | R_{22} | R_{23} | R_{24} | R_{25} |
| R_{15} | R_{14} | R_{13} | R_{12} | R_{11} | R_{10} | R_{9} | R_{8} | R_{7} | R_{6} |
| | | | | | R_{1} | R_{2} | R_{3} | R_{4} | R_{5} |

=== Result of the general elections ===
| | | | | | D_{1} | D_{2} | D_{3} | D_{4} | D_{5} |
| D_{15} | D_{14} | D_{13} | D_{12} | D_{11} | D_{10} | D_{9} | D_{8} | D_{7} | D_{6} |
| D_{16} Re-elected | D_{17} Re-elected | D_{18} Re-elected | D_{19} Re-elected | D_{20} Re-elected | D_{21} Hold | D_{22} Hold | D_{23} Hold | D_{24} Hold | D_{25} Hold |
| SR_{1} | S_{1} | S_{2} | P_{1} | P_{2} | P_{3} | P_{4} | D_{28} Gain from P | D_{27} Gain from R | D_{26} Gain from R |
| SR_{2} | SR_{3} Gain from R | R_{48} Gain from SR | R_{47} Re-elected | R_{46} Re-elected | R_{45} Re-elected | R_{44} Hold | R_{43} Re-elected | V_{5} D Loss | V_{1} |
| Majority → | | | | | | | R_{43} Re-elected | V_{4} R Loss | V_{2} |
| R_{36} Re-elected | R_{37} Re-elected | R_{38} Re-elected | R_{39} Re-elected | R_{40} Re-elected | R_{41} Re-elected | R_{42} Hold | R_{43} Re-elected | V_{4} R Loss | V_{3} |
| R_{35} Re-elected | R_{34} | R_{33} | R_{32} | R_{31} | R_{30} | R_{29} | R_{28} | R_{27} | R_{26} |
| R_{16} | R_{17} | R_{18} | R_{19} | R_{20} | R_{21} | R_{22} | R_{23} | R_{24} | R_{25} |
| R_{15} | R_{14} | R_{13} | R_{12} | R_{11} | R_{10} | R_{9} | R_{8} | R_{7} | R_{6} |
| | | | | | R_{1} | R_{2} | R_{3} | R_{4} | R_{5} |

=== Beginning of the next Congress ===
| | | | | | D_{1} | D_{2} | D_{3} | D_{4} | D_{5} |
| D_{15} | D_{14} | D_{13} | D_{12} | D_{11} | D_{10} Change from SR | D_{9} | D_{8} | D_{7} | D_{6} |
| D_{16} | D_{17} | D_{18} | D_{19} | D_{20} | D_{21} | D_{22} | D_{23} | D_{24} | D_{25} |
| R_{52} Gain from V | R_{53} Gain from V | SR_{2} | SR_{1} | P_{1} | P_{2} | P_{3} | D_{28} | D_{27} | D_{26} |
| R_{51} Change from P | R_{50} Change from S | R_{49} Change from S | R_{48} | R_{47} | R_{46} | R_{45} | R_{44} | V_{4} D Loss | V_{1} |
| Majority → | | | | | | | R_{44} | V_{4} D Loss | V_{1} |
| R_{36} | R_{37} | R_{38} | R_{39} | R_{40} | R_{41} | R_{42} | R_{43} | V_{3} | V_{2} |
| R_{35} | R_{34} | R_{33} | R_{32} | R_{31} | R_{30} | R_{29} | R_{28} | R_{27} | R_{26} |
| R_{16} | R_{17} | R_{18} | R_{19} | R_{20} | R_{21} | R_{22} | R_{23} | R_{24} | R_{25} |
| R_{15} | R_{14} | R_{13} | R_{12} | R_{11} | R_{10} | R_{9} | R_{8} | R_{7} | R_{6} |
| | | | | | R_{1} | R_{2} | R_{3} | R_{4} | R_{5} |

Key:

| D_{#} | Democratic |
| P_{#} | Populist |
| R_{#} | Republican |
| S_{#} | Silver |
| SR_{#} | Silver Republican |
| V_{#} | Vacant |

== Race summaries ==
=== Elections to the 56th Congress ===
In these elections, the winner was seated in the current (56th) Congress during 1900 or in 1901 before March 4; ordered by election date.

| State | Incumbent | | | Results | Candidates |
| State | Senator | Party | Electoral history | Results | Candidates |
|---|---|---|---|---|---|
| Mississippi (Class 2) | William V. Sullivan | Democratic | 1898 (appointed) | Interim appointee elected January 16, 1900. Winner was not a candidate in the election for the next term; see below. | ▌ ✓ William V. Sullivan (Democratic); Unopposed |
| California (Class 1) | Vacant | | | Legislature had failed to elect. New senator elected February 7, 1900. Republican gain. | ▌ ✓ Thomas R. Bard (Republican) 85; ▌James D. Phelan (Democratic) 30; ▌Stephen M. White (Democratic) 1 |
| Vermont (Class 3) | Jonathan Ross | Republican | 1899 (appointed) | Interim appointee retired. New senator elected October 18, 1900. Republican hold. | ▌ ✓ William P. Dillingham (Republican) 162; ▌William W. Grout (Republican) 96; ▌Seneca Hazleton (Democratic) 6; ▌Jonathan Ross (Republican) 5; ▌C. A. Prouty (Republican) 1 |
| Pennsylvania (Class 1) | Vacant | | | Legislature had failed to elect. Predecessor appointed, but declared not entitled to the seat. Predecessor re-elected January 16, 1901. Republican gain. | ▌ ✓ Matthew Quay (Republican) 130; ▌James M. Guffey (Democratic) 56; ▌John Dalzell (Republican) 34; ▌Charles E. Smith (Republican) 12; ▌George F. Huff (Republican) 7; ▌John Stewart (Republican) 3; Others, 1 each; see below |
| Minnesota (Class 1) | Charles A. Towne | Democratic | 1900 (appointed) | Interim appointee lost election. New senator elected January 23, 1901. Republican gain. | ▌ ✓ Moses E. Clapp (Republican) 135; ▌Charles A. Towne (Democratic) 38 |
| Utah (Class 1) | Vacant | | | Legislature had failed to elect. New senator elected January 23, 1901. Republican gain. | ▌ ✓ Thomas Kearns (Republican) 37; ▌Alfred W. McCune (Democratic) 25 |
| Delaware (Class 1) | Vacant | | | Legislature had failed to elect to begin the term. Legislature again failed to elect to finish the term. | ▌J. Edward Addicks (Republican); ▌Charles F. Richards (Republican); ▌Willard Saulsbury (Democratic) |

=== Elections to the 57th Congress ===
In these general elections, the winners were elected for the term beginning March 4, 1901; ordered by state.

All of the elections involved the Class 2 seats.

| State | Incumbent | | | Results | Candidates |
| State | Senator | Party | Electoral history | Results | Candidates |
|---|---|---|---|---|---|
| Alabama | John T. Morgan | Democratic | 1876; 1882; 1888; 1894 | Incumbent re-elected November 27, 1900. | ▌ ✓ John T. Morgan (Democratic); Unopposed |
| Arkansas | James H. Berry | Democratic | 1885 (special); 1889; 1895 | Incumbent re-elected January 22, 1901. | ▌ ✓ James H. Berry (Democratic) 123; ▌H. L. Remmel (Republican) 2 |
| Colorado | Edward O. Wolcott | Republican | 1889; 1895 | Incumbent lost re-election. New senator elected January 15, 1901. Democratic gain. | ▌ ✓ Thomas M. Patterson (Democratic) 91; ▌Edward O. Wolcott (Republican) 8 |
| Delaware | Richard R. Kenney | Democratic | 1897 (special) | Legislature failed to elect. Democratic loss. | ▌J. Edward Addicks (Republican); ▌Henry A. du Pont (Republican); ▌Anthony Higgins (Republican); ▌Richard R. Kenney (Democratic) |
| Georgia | Augustus O. Bacon | Democratic | 1894 | Incumbent re-elected November 6, 1900. | ▌ ✓ Augustus O. Bacon (Democratic); Unopposed |
| Idaho | George L. Shoup | Republican | 1890; 1895 | Incumbent lost re-election. New senator elected January 16, 1901. Silver Republican gain. New senator changed party to Democratic. | ▌ ✓ Fred Dubois (Silver Republican) 37; ▌George L. Shoup (Republican) 27 |
| Illinois | Shelby M. Cullom | Republican | 1882; 1888; 1894 | Incumbent re-elected January 22, 1901. | ▌ ✓ Shelby M. Cullom (Republican) 100; ▌Samuel Alschuler (Democratic) 85 |
| Iowa | John H. Gear | Republican | 1894 | Incumbent re-elected January 17, 1900. Incumbent died July 14, 1900. A new senator was appointed to finish the term and to the next term. | ▌ ✓ John H. Gear (Republican) 111; ▌Fred E. White (Democratic) 32 |
| Kansas | Lucien Baker | Republican | 1895 | Incumbent lost re-election. New senator elected January 22, 1901. Republican hold. | ▌ ✓ Joseph R. Burton (Republican) 109; ▌David Overmyer (Democratic) 51 |
| Kentucky | William Lindsay | Democratic | 1893 (special); 1894 | Incumbent retired. New senator elected January 16, 1900, after an election on January 9, 1900. Democratic hold. | ▌ ✓ J. C. S. Blackburn (Democratic) 77; ▌William O. Bradley (Republican) 53 |
| Louisiana | Donelson Caffery | Democratic | 1894 (appointed); 1894 (special); 1894 | Incumbent retired. New senator elected May 22, 1900. Democratic hold. | ▌ ✓ Murphy J. Foster (Democratic) 148; Unopposed |
| Maine | William P. Frye | Republican | 1881 (special); 1883; 1889; 1895 | Incumbent re-elected January 15, 1901. | ▌ ✓ William P. Frye (Republican) 131; ▌Swasey M. Staples (Democratic) 14 |
| Massachusetts | George F. Hoar | Republican | 1877; 1883; 1889; 1895 | Incumbent re-elected January 15, 1901. | ▌ ✓ George F. Hoar (Republican) 77; ▌Richard Olney (Democratic) 56; ▌Charles H. Bradley (Social Democratic) 1 |
| Michigan | James McMillan | Republican | 1889; 1895 | Incumbent re-elected January 15, 1901. | ▌ ✓ James McMillan (Republican) 116; ▌Thomas E. Barkworth (Unknown) 1 |
| Minnesota | Knute Nelson | Republican | 1895 | Incumbent re-elected January 22, 1901. | ▌ ✓ Knute Nelson (Republican) 136; ▌R. R. Nelson (Democratic) 40 |
| Mississippi | William V. Sullivan | Democratic | 1898 (appointed) | Incumbent retired. New senator elected January 16, 1900. Democratic hold. Winner was not a candidate to finish the term; see above. | ▌ ✓ Anselm J. McLaurin (Democratic); Unopposed |
| Montana | Thomas H. Carter | Republican | 1895 | Incumbent lost re-election. New senator elected January 16, 1901. Democratic gain. The election was later challenged. | ▌ ✓ William A. Clark (Democratic) 57 votes; ▌Thomas H. Carter (Republican) 31 votes; ▌Martin Maginnis (Democratic) 4 votes; ▌R. B. Smith (Democratic) 1 vote |
| Nebraska | John M. Thurston | Republican | 1895 | Legislature failed to elect. Republican loss. | [data missing] |
| New Hampshire | William E. Chandler | Republican | 1889 (special); 1895 | Incumbent lost remomination. New senator elected January 15, 1901. Republican hold. | ▌ ✓ Henry E. Burnham (Republican) 301; ▌Charles F. Stone (Democratic) 84; ▌Henry M. Baker (Independent) 1 |
| New Jersey | William J. Sewell | Republican | 1895 | Incumbent re-elected January 22, 1901. | ▌ ✓ William J. Sewell (Republican) 62; ▌Alvah A. Clark (Democratic) 17 |
| North Carolina | Marion Butler | Populist | 1894 | Incumbent lost re-election. New senator elected January 22, 1901. Democratic gain. | ▌ ✓ F. M. Simmons (Democratic) 124; ▌Richmond Pearson (Republican) 26 |
| Oregon | George W. McBride | Republican | 1895 | Incumbent lost renomination. New senator elected February 24, 1901. Republican hold. | ▌ ✓ John H. Mitchell (Republican) 46; ▌Henry W. Corbett (Republican) 29; ▌A. S. Bennett (Democratic) 16 |
| Rhode Island | George P. Wetmore | Republican | 1894 | Incumbent re-elected June 12, 1900. | ▌ ✓ George P. Wetmore (Republican) 88; ▌Samuel R. Honey (Democratic) 10 |
| South Carolina | Benjamin Tillman | Democratic | 1894 | Incumbent re-elected January 15, 1901. | ▌ ✓ Benjamin Tillman (Democratic); Unopposed |
| South Dakota | Richard F. Pettigrew | Silver; Republican | 1889; 1894 | Incumbent lost re-election. New senator elected January 22, 1901. Republican gain. | ▌ ✓ Robert J. Gamble (Republican) 115; ▌Richard F. Pettigrew (Silver Republican) 13 |
| Tennessee | Thomas B. Turley | Democratic | 1883 | Incumbent retired. New senator elected January 16, 1901. Democratic hold. | ▌ ✓ Edward W. Carmack (Democratic) 99; ▌Thomas N. Burkett (Republican) 24 |
| Texas | Horace Chilton | Democratic | 1895 | Incumbent retired. New senator elected January 22, 1901. Democratic hold. | ▌ ✓ Joseph W. Bailey (Democratic) 137; ▌Edwin A. Atlee (Democratic) 2; ▌Horace Chilton (Democratic) 2; ▌M. M. Crane (Democratic) 1; ▌John H. Reagan (Democratic) 1 |
| Virginia | Thomas S. Martin | Democratic | 1893 (early) | Incumbent had already been re-elected early December 19, 1899. | |
| West Virginia | Stephen B. Elkins | Republican | 1895 | Incumbent re-elected January 22, 1901. | ▌ ✓ Stephen B. Elkins (Republican) 61; ▌John T. McGraw (Democratic) 23 |
| Wyoming | Francis E. Warren | Republican | 1890; 1893 (lost); 1895 | Incumbent re-elected January 22, 1901. | ▌ ✓ Francis E. Warren (Republican) 52; ▌John E. Osborne (Democratic) 3 |

=== Early election to the 58th Congress ===
In this election, the winner was seated in the 58th Congress, starting March 4, 1903.

| State | Incumbent | | | Results | Candidates |
| State | Senator | Party | Electoral history | Results | Candidates |
|---|---|---|---|---|---|
| Louisiana (Class 3) | Samuel D. McEnery | Democratic | 1896 | Incumbent re-elected early May 22, 1900 for the term beginning March 4, 1903. | ▌ ✓ Samuel D. McEnery (Democratic) 148; Unopposed |

=== Elections during the 57th Congress ===
In these elections, the winners was elected in 1901 after March 4 and seated in the 57th Congress.

| State | Incumbent | | | Results | Candidates |
| State | Senator | Party | Electoral history | Results | Candidates |
|---|---|---|---|---|---|
| Montana (Class 1) | Vacant | | | William A. Clark resigned May 15, 1900, and was later elected to the state's other seat; see above. New senator elected March 7, 1901. Democratic gain. | ▌ ✓ Paris Gibson (Democratic) 47; ▌Thomas H. Carter (Republican) 33; ▌John MacGinnis (Democratic)11; ▌H. L. Frank (Democratic) 1 |
| Nebraska (Class 1) | William V. Allen | Populist | 1893; 1899 (lost); 1899 (appointed) | Interim appointee lost election as a Fusion candidate. New senator elected March 28, 1901. Republican gain. | ▌ ✓ Charles H. Dietrich (Republican) 70; ▌William V. Allen (Fusion) 58; ▌George W. Berge (Unknown) 2 |
| Nebraska (Class 2) | Vacant | | | Legislature had failed to elect; see above. New senator elected March 28, 1901. Republican gain. | ▌ ✓ Joseph Millard (Republican) 70; ▌William H. Thompson (Fusion) 52; ▌Gilbert Hitchcock (Fusion) 8 |

== Pennsylvania (special) ==
The special election in Pennsylvania was held on January 15, 1901, after the regularly scheduled legislative election in January–April 1899 failed to elect a Senator. Former Senator Matthew Quay, who had left the Senate for nearly two years because of the political stalemate, was again elected by the Pennsylvania General Assembly to the United States Senate.

Republican Matthew Quay was re-elected by the Pennsylvania General Assembly, consisting of the House of Representatives and the Senate, in the 1893 election. With Sen. Quay's term expiring on March 4, 1899, the General Assembly convened on January 18, 1899, to elect a Senator for the next term. Between January 18 and April 19, 1899, seventy-nine ballots were recorded in an attempt to elect a Senator. Instead, the legislature adjourned sine die without electing a Senator due to a dispute between Sen. Quay's political machine and an anti-Quay faction within the Republican Party, along with Democratic Party opposition.

Sen. Quay's term expired on March 4, 1899. Since a Senator had not been elected for the successive term, the seat was vacated. At the time, Quay was under indictment for misuse of funds. He was acquitted, after which Governor William Stone appointed Quay to the vacated Senate seat (a power the Governor did not legally have until the ratification of the 17th Amendment to the U.S. Constitution in 1913). The Senate refused to recognize Quay's appointment, and the seat remained vacant until a Senator could be officially elected (which would ultimately be Quay himself, after a nearly two-year hiatus). This incident, among others, would later be cited by supporters of the 17th Amendment, which mandated the direct election of U.S. Senators.

The Pennsylvania General Assembly convened on January 15, 1901, for a special election to elect a Senator to serve out the remainder of the term that began on March 4, 1899. The results of the vote of both houses combined are as follows:

State Legislature Results
| Party | Candidate | Votes | % |
|---|---|---|---|
| Republican | Matthew Quay | 130 | 51.18 |
| Democratic | James M. Guffey | 56 | 22.05 |
| Republican | John Dalzell | 34 | 13.39 |
| Republican | Charles E. Smith | 12 | 4.72 |
| Republican | George Franklin Huff | 7 | 2.76 |
| Republican | John Stewart | 3 | 1.18 |
| Socialist | John H. Harris | 1 | 0.39 |
| Republican | William McConway | 1 | 0.39 |
| Republican | Henry C. McCormick | 1 | 0.39 |
| Republican | Marlin Olmsted | 1 | 0.39 |
| Prohibition | Silas C. Swallow | 1 | 0.39 |
| Republican | Charles Tubbs | 1 | 0.39 |
| N/A | Not voting | 6 | 2.36 |
| Totals | | 254 | 100.00% |

== See also ==
- 1900 United States elections
  - 1900 United States presidential election
  - 1900 United States House of Representatives elections
- 56th United States Congress
- 57th United States Congress
