= 1894–95 United States Senate elections =

- Dates vary by state
- Class 2

30 of the 88 seats in the United States Senate (as well as special elections) 45 seats needed for a majority
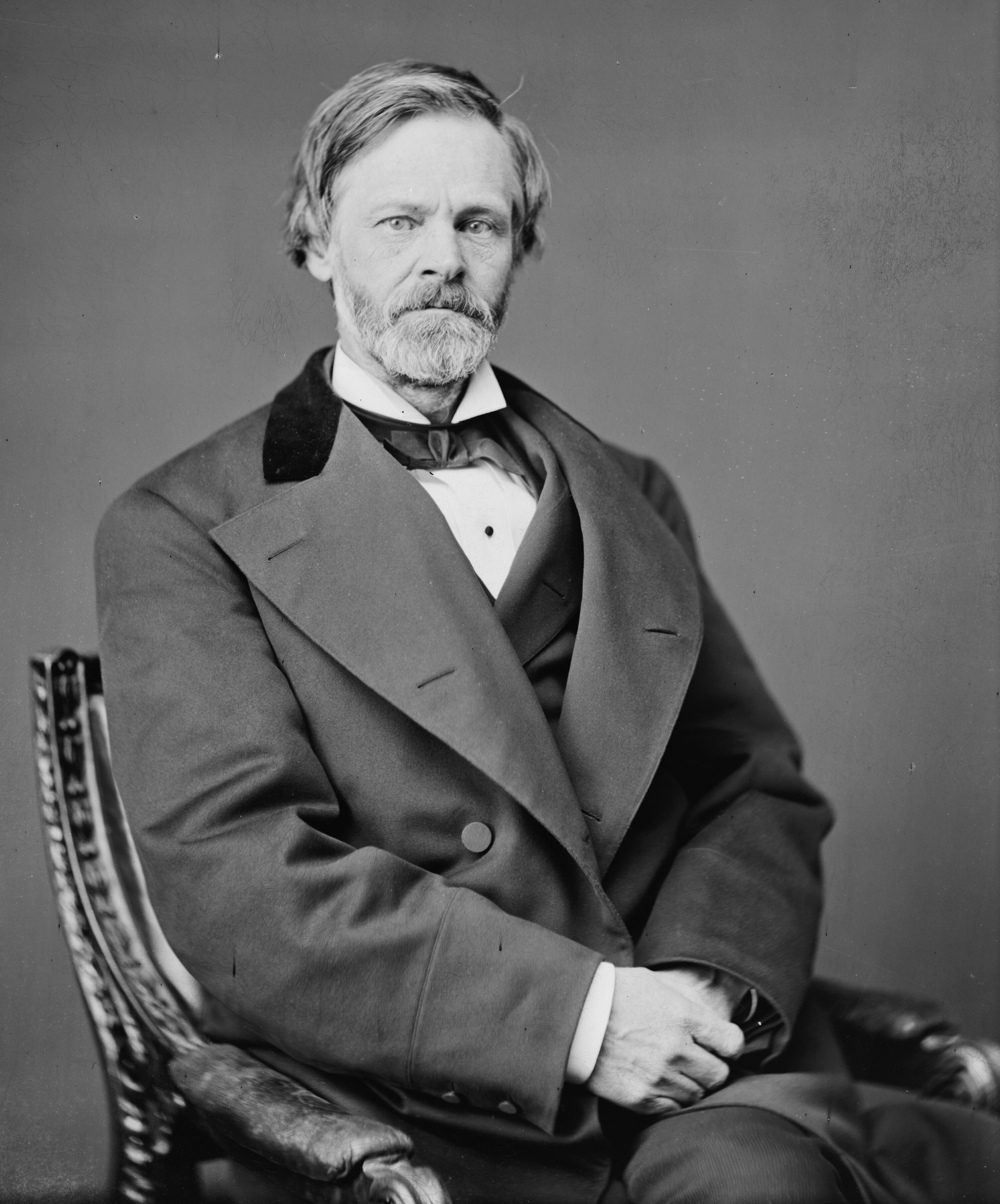

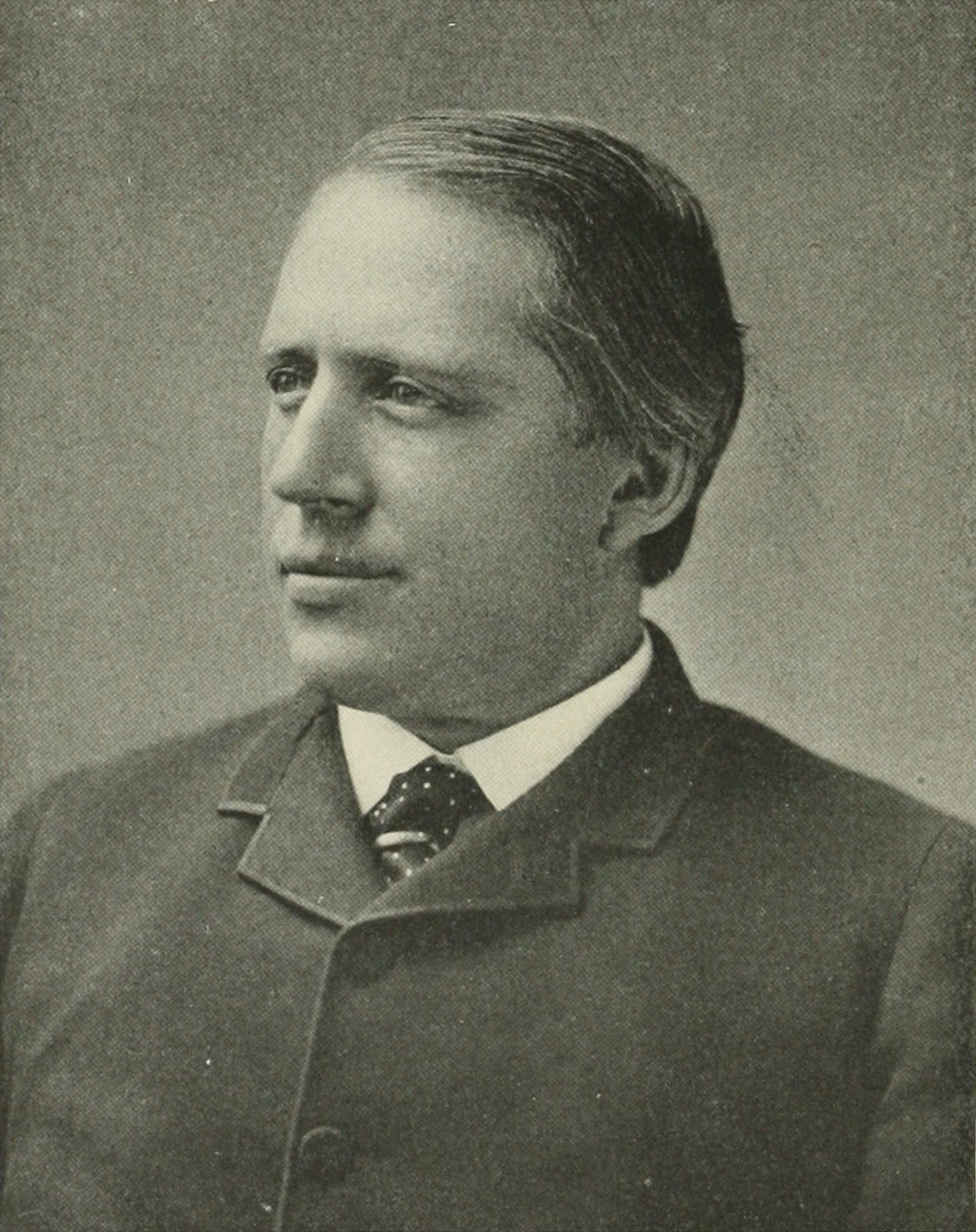
	Majority party	Minority party
Leader	John Sherman (Note: as Republican Conference Chair)	Arthur Pue Gorman (Note: as Democratic Caucus Chair)
Party	Republican	Democratic
Leader since	March 4, 1891	March 4, 1889
Leader's seat	Ohio	Maryland
Seats before	37	44
Seats won	18	10
Seats after	39	40
Seat change	▲2	▼4
Seats up	16	14
	Third party	Fourth party
Party	Populist	Silver
Seats before	3	1
Seats won	1	0
Seats after	4	1
Seat change	▲1	Steady
Seats up	0	0
- Results of the elections: Democratic hold Republican gain Republican hold Populist gain Legislature failed to elect
Majority Party before election
Democratic
Elected Majority Party
Republican

The 1894–95 United States Senate elections were held on various dates in various states. As these U.S. Senate elections were prior to the ratification of the Seventeenth Amendment in 1913, senators were chosen by state legislatures. Senators were elected over a wide range of time throughout 1894 and 1895, and a seat may have been filled months late or remained vacant due to legislative deadlock. In these elections, terms were up for the senators in Class 2.

The Republican Party gained plurality control of the Senate with the support of the Populist Party and the Silver Party.

== Results summary ==
Senate party division, 54th Congress (1895–1897)

- Plurality: Republican: 42
- Minority: Democrats: 39
- Other parties: Populist: 4, Silver: 2
- Total: 88
- Vacant: 1, due to failure to elect. Later filled by a Democrat

== Change in composition ==
=== Before the elections ===
At the beginning of 1894, including early elections in Mississippi and Virginia.

						D_{1}	D_{2}	D_{3}	D_{4}
D_{14}	D_{13}	D_{12}	D_{11}	D_{10}	D_{9}	D_{8}	D_{7}	D_{6}	D_{5}
D_{15}	D_{16}	D_{17}	D_{18}	D_{19}	D_{20}	D_{21}	D_{22}	D_{23}	D_{24}
D_{34} Ky. Ran	D_{33} Ga. Ran	D_{32} Ark. Ran	D_{31} Ala. Ran	D_{30}	D_{29}	D_{28}	D_{27}	D_{26}	D_{25}
D_{35} La. Ran	D_{36} N.C. Ran	D_{37} S.C. Ran	D_{38} Tenn. Ran	D_{39} W.Va. Ran	D_{40} Kan. Unknown	D_{41} N.J. Unknown	D_{42} Miss. Retired	D_{43} Texas; Retired	D_{44} Va. Retired
Majority with vacancies →									D_{44} Va. Retired
R_{35} Iowa; Retired	R_{36} Mont. Retired	R_{37} R.I. Retired	S_{1}	P_{1}	P_{2}	P_{3}	V_{3}	V_{2}	V_{1}
R_{34} Neb. Unknown	R_{33} Wyo. Ran	R_{32} S.D. Ran	R_{31} Ore. Ran	R_{30} N.H. Ran	R_{29} Minn. Ran	R_{28} Mich. Ran	R_{27} Mass. Ran	R_{26} Maine; Ran	R_{25} Ill. Ran
R_{15}	R_{16}	R_{17}	R_{18}	R_{19}	R_{20}	R_{21}	R_{22} Colo. Ran	R_{23} Del. Ran	R_{24} Idaho; Ran
R_{14}	R_{13}	R_{12}	R_{11}	R_{10}	R_{9}	R_{8}	R_{7}	R_{6}	R_{5}
						R_{1}	R_{2}	R_{3}	R_{4}

=== Result of the general elections ===
						D_{1}	D_{2}	D_{3}	D_{4}
D_{14}	D_{13}	D_{12}	D_{11}	D_{10}	D_{9}	D_{8}	D_{7}	D_{6}	D_{5}
D_{15}	D_{16}	D_{17}	D_{18}	D_{19}	D_{20}	D_{21}	D_{22}	D_{23}	D_{24}
D_{34} La. Appointee elected (Note: Same result for this seat in general and special elections)	D_{33} Ky. Re-elected	D_{32} Ark. Re-elected	D_{31} Ala. Re-elected	D_{30}	D_{29}	D_{28}	D_{27}	D_{26}	D_{25}
D_{35} Tenn. Re-elected	D_{36} Ga. Hold	D_{37} Miss. Hold (Note: Elected early)	D_{38} S.C. Hold	D_{39} Texas; Hold	D_{40} Va. Hold	P_{4} N.C. Gain	P_{3}	V_{1}	V_{2}
No majority
R_{35} R.I. Hold	R_{36} Wyo. Hold	R_{37} Kan. Gain	R_{38} N.J. Gain	R_{39} W.Va. Gain	S_{1}	P_{1}	P_{2}	V_{4} Del. R Loss	V_{3}
R_{34} Ore. Hold	R_{33} Neb. Hold	R_{32} Mont. Hold	R_{31} Minn. Hold	R_{30} Iowa; Hold	R_{29} S.D. Re-elected	R_{28} N.H. Re-elected	R_{27} Mich. Re-elected	R_{26} Mass. Re-elected	R_{25} Maine; Re-elected
R_{15}	R_{16}	R_{17}	R_{18}	R_{19}	R_{20}	R_{21}	R_{22} Colo. Re-elected	R_{23} Idaho; Re-elected	R_{24} Ill. Re-elected
R_{14}	R_{13}	R_{12}	R_{11}	R_{10}	R_{9}	R_{8}	R_{7}	R_{6}	R_{5}
						R_{1}	R_{2}	R_{3}	R_{4}

=== Result of the special elections and party change ===
						D_{1} Calif. Appointee elected	D_{2} La. Appointee elected	D_{3}	D_{4}
D_{14}	D_{13}	D_{12}	D_{11}	D_{10}	D_{9}	D_{8}	D_{7}	D_{6}	D_{5}
D_{15}	D_{16}	D_{17}	D_{18}	D_{19}	D_{20}	D_{21}	D_{22}	D_{23}	D_{24}
D_{34} La. Appointee elected	D_{33}	D_{32}	D_{31}	D_{30}	D_{29}	D_{28}	D_{27}	D_{26}	D_{25}
D_{35}	D_{36} Ga. Appointee elected	D_{37} Miss. Hold	D_{38}	D_{39}	P_{4}	P_{3}	P_{2}	P_{1}	V_{1}
↓ Republican plurality (majority with Silver support →)									S_{1}
R_{35}	R_{36}	R_{37}	R_{38}	R_{39} Mont. Gain from V	R_{40} Wash. Gain from V	R_{41} Wyo. Gain from V	R_{42} N.C. Gain from D	S_{2} Nev. Changed from R	S_{1}
R_{34}	R_{33}	R_{32}	R_{31}	R_{30}	R_{29}	R_{28}	R_{27}	R_{26}	R_{25}
R_{15}	R_{16}	R_{17}	R_{18}	R_{19}	R_{20}	R_{21}	R_{22}	R_{23}	R_{24}
R_{14}	R_{13}	R_{12}	R_{11}	R_{10}	R_{9}	R_{8}	R_{7}	R_{6}	R_{5}
						R_{1} Mich. Hold	R_{2}	R_{3}	R_{4}

Key:

D_{#}	Democratic
P_{#}	Populist
R_{#}	Republican
S_{#}	Silver
V_{#}	Vacant

== Race summaries ==
=== Elections during the 53rd Congress ===
In these elections, the winners were seated during 1894 or in 1895 before March 4; ordered by election date.

State	Incumbent			Results	Candidates
State	Senator	Party	Electoral history	Results	Candidates
Mississippi (Class 2)	Edward C. Walthall	Democratic	1885 (appointed); 1886 (special); 1889; 1892 (early)	Incumbent resigned due to ill health. New senator elected February 7, 1894. Democratic hold. Walthall, however, had already been re-elected to next term.	▌ ✓ Anselm J. McLaurin (Democratic); [data missing]
Louisiana (Class 2)	Donelson Caffery	Democratic	1892 (appointed)	Interim appointee elected May 23, 1894. Winner had already been elected to the next term; see below.	▌ ✓ Donelson Caffery (Democratic); [data missing]
Louisiana (Class 3)	Newton C. Blanchard	Democratic	1894 (appointed)	Interim appointee elected May 23, 1894.	▌ ✓ Newton C. Blanchard (Democratic); [data missing]
Georgia (Class 2)	Patrick Walsh	Democratic	1894 (appointed)	Interim appointee elected November 7, 1894. Winner was not elected to the next term; see below.	▌ ✓ Patrick Walsh (Democratic); [data missing]
North Carolina (Class 3)	Thomas Jarvis	Democratic	1894 (appointed)	Interim appointee retired or lost election to finish the term. New senator elected November 7, 1894. Republican gain. New senator qualified January 23, 1895.	▌ ✓ Jeter C. Pritchard (Republican); [data missing]
Montana (Class 1)	Vacant			Legislature had failed to elect. New senator elected January 16, 1895. Republican gain.	▌ ✓ Lee Mantle (Republican); [data missing]
Wyoming (Class 1)	Vacant			Legislature had failed to elect. New senator elected January 23, 1895. Republican gain.	▌ ✓ Clarence D. Clark (Republican); [data missing]
California (Class 3)	George C. Perkins	Republican	1893 (appointed)	Interim appointee elected January 23, 1895.	▌ ✓ George C. Perkins (Republican); [data missing]
Michigan (Class 1)	John Patton Jr.	Republican	1894 (appointed)	Interim appointee lost election to finish the term. New senator elected January 24, 1895. Republican hold.	▌ ✓ Julius C. Burrows (Republican); [data missing]
Washington (Class 1)	Vacant			Legislature had failed to elect. New senator elected February 1, 1895. Republican gain.	▌ ✓ John L. Wilson (Republican); [data missing]

=== Elections leading to the 54th Congress ===
In these regular elections, the winners were elected for the term beginning March 4, 1895; ordered by state.

All of the elections involved the Class 2 seats.

State	Incumbent			Results	Candidates
State	Senator	Party	Electoral history	Results	Candidates
Alabama	John T. Morgan	Democratic	1876; 1882; 1888	Incumbent re-elected in 1894.	▌ ✓ John T. Morgan (Democratic); [data missing]
Arkansas	James Berry	Democratic	1885 (special); 1889	Incumbent re-elected in 1895.	▌ ✓ James Berry (Democratic); [data missing]
Colorado	Edward O. Wolcott	Republican	1889	Incumbent re-elected in 1895.	▌ ✓ Edward O. Wolcott (Republican); [data missing]
Delaware	Anthony C. Higgins	Republican	1888–89	Legislature failed to elect. Republican loss.	▌Anthony C. Higgins (Republican) [data missing]
Georgia	Patrick Walsh	Democratic	1894 (special)	Incumbent lost renomination. New senator elected in 1894. Democratic hold.	▌ ✓ Augustus Bacon (Democratic); [data missing]
Idaho	George Shoup	Republican	1890	Incumbent re-elected in 1895.	▌ ✓ George Shoup (Republican); [data missing]
Illinois	Shelby M. Cullom	Republican	1882; 1888	Incumbent re-elected in 1894.	▌ ✓ Shelby M. Cullom (Republican); [data missing]
Iowa	James F. Wilson	Republican	1888	Incumbent retired. New senator elected January 17, 1894. Republican hold.	▌ ✓ John H. Gear (Republican); ▌Horace Boies (Democratic)
Kansas	John Martin	Democratic	1893 (special)	Incumbent retired or lost re-election. New senator elected in January 1895. Republican gain.	▌ ✓ Lucien Baker (Republican); [data missing]
Kentucky	William Lindsay	Democratic	1893 (special)	Incumbent re-elected January 16, 1894, after an election on January 9, 1894.	▌ ✓ William Lindsay (Democratic) 89; ▌ Frank Finley (Republican) 30; ▌ Clarence Bate (Republican) 1
Louisiana	Donelson Caffery	Democratic	1891 (appointed)	Interim appointee elected May 14, 1894. Winner was later elected to finish the current term; see below.	▌ ✓ Donelson Caffery (Democratic) 97; ▌[FNU] Jones (Unknown) 21; ▌Allen Barksdale (Unknown) 7
Maine	William P. Frye	Republican	1881 (special); 1883; 1889	Incumbent re-elected in 1895.	▌ ✓ William P. Frye (Republican); [data missing]
Massachusetts	George F. Hoar	Republican	1877; 1883; 1889	Incumbent re-elected in 1895.	▌ ✓ George F. Hoar (Republican); [data missing]
Michigan	James McMillan	Republican	1889	Incumbent re-elected in 1895.	▌ ✓ James McMillan (Republican); [data missing]
Minnesota	W. D. Washburn	Republican	1888	Incumbent lost re-election. New senator elected in 1895. Republican hold.	▌ ✓ Knute Nelson (Republican); ▌W. D. Washburn (Republican); [data missing]
Mississippi	Anselm J. McLaurin	Democratic	1894 (special)	Incumbent retired as predecessor had already been elected early to the next term January 20, 1892. Democratic hold.	▌ ✓ Edward C. Walthall (Democratic); ▌Clerk Lewis (Unknown); ▌C. E. Hooker (Unknown)
Montana	Thomas C. Power	Republican	1890	Incumbent retired. New senator elected in January 1895. Republican hold.	▌ ✓ Thomas H. Carter (Republican); [data missing]
Nebraska	Charles F. Manderson	Republican	1883; 1888	Incumbent retired or lost re-election. New senator elected January 15, 1895. Republican hold.	▌ ✓ John M. Thurston (Republican); ▌William Jennings Bryan (Democratic); [data missing]
New Hampshire	William E. Chandler	Republican	1887 (special); 1889 (failure to elect); 1889 (special)	Incumbent re-elected in 1895.	▌ ✓ William E. Chandler (Republican); [data missing]
New Jersey	John R. McPherson	Democratic	1877; 1883; 1889	Incumbent retired or lost re-election. New senator elected in 1895. Republican gain.	▌ ✓ William Joyce Sewell (Republican); [data missing]
North Carolina	Matt W. Ransom	Democratic	1872 (special); 1876; 1883; 1889	Incumbent lost re-election. New senator elected in 1894. Populist gain.	▌ ✓ Marion Butler (Populist); ▌Matt W. Ransom (Democratic); [data missing]
Oregon	Joseph N. Dolph	Republican	1882; 1888	Incumbent lost re-election. New senator elected February 23, 1895. Republican hold.	▌ ✓ George W. McBride (Republican); ▌Joseph N. Dolph (Republican); [data missing]
Rhode Island	Nathan F. Dixon III	Republican	1889 (special)	Incumbent retired. New senator elected in 1894. Republican hold.	▌ ✓ George P. Wetmore (Republican); [data missing]
South Carolina	Matthew Butler	Democratic	1876; 1882; 1888	Incumbent lost renomination. New senator elected in 1894. Democratic hold.	▌ ✓ Benjamin Tillman (Democratic); [data missing]
South Dakota	Richard F. Pettigrew	Republican	1889	Incumbent re-elected in 1894.	▌ ✓ Richard F. Pettigrew (Republican); [data missing]
Tennessee	Isham G. Harris	Democratic	1877; 1883; 1889	Incumbent re-elected in 1895.	▌ ✓ Isham G. Harris (Democratic); [data missing]
Texas	Richard Coke	Democratic	1876; 1883; 1889	Incumbent retired. New senator elected January 23, 1895. Democratic hold.	▌ ✓ Horace Chilton (Democratic) 128; ▌ Thomas L. Nugent (Populist) 23; ▌ Thomas S. Smith (Democratic) 1
Virginia	Eppa Hunton	Democratic	1892 (appointed); 1893 (special)	Incumbent retired. New senator was already elected early December 19, 1893. Democratic hold.	▌ ✓ Thomas S. Martin (Democratic); [data missing]
West Virginia	Johnson N. Camden	Democratic	1893 (special)	Incumbent lost re-election. New senator elected January 23, 1895. Republican gain.	▌ ✓ Stephen B. Elkins (Republican) 60; ▌Johnson N. Camden (Democratic) 29; ▌[FNU] Neal (Populist) 2
Wyoming	Joseph M. Carey	Republican	1890	Incumbent lost re-election. New senator elected in 1895. Republican hold.	▌ ✓ Francis E. Warren (Republican); ▌Joseph M. Carey (Republican)

=== Elections during the 54th Congress ===
There were no elections in 1895 after March 4.

== Alabama ==
Former brigadier general in the Confederate States Army John T. Morgan was re-elected as one of the two senators in the state of Alabama. His tenure as senator ended in 1907 when he died in office.

== Louisiana ==
Interim appointee Donelson Caffery (D) was elected May 14, 1894 to the next term. He was later (May 23, 1894) elected to finish the current term.

== Louisiana (special, class 2) ==
Randall L. Gibson (D) had been re-elected in 1889, but died December 15, 1892. Donelson Caffery (D) was appointed by the Governor of Louisiana December 31, 1892 to continue the term, pending a special election. On May 14, 1894, Caffery was elected to the next term, and on May 23, 1894, Caffery was elected to finish the current term.

== Louisiana (special, class 3) ==
Edward Douglass White (D) had been elected in 1891, but resigned March 12, 1894 when appointed to the U.S. Supreme Court. Newton C. Blanchard (D) was appointed by the Governor of Louisiana March 12, 1894 to continue the term, pending a special election. On May 23, 1894, Blanchard was elected to finish the current term, which would end March 3, 1897.

== Washington (special) ==
John B. Allen (R) had been elected in 1889 as one of the first senators from Washington. In 1893, however, the Washington State Legislature failed to elect a senator for the term beginning March 4, 1893. The governor appointed Allen to serve until March 20, 1893, but the Senate rejected his credentials.

John L. Wilson (R) was elected February 1, 1895 to finish the term, that would end March 3, 1899, taking his seat February 19, 1895.

== See also ==
- 1894 United States elections
  - 1894 United States House of Representatives elections
- 53rd United States Congress
- 54th United States Congress
