= 1888–89 United States Senate elections =

- Dates vary by state
- Class 2

26 of the 76 seats in the United States Senate (as well as special elections) 39 seats needed for a majority
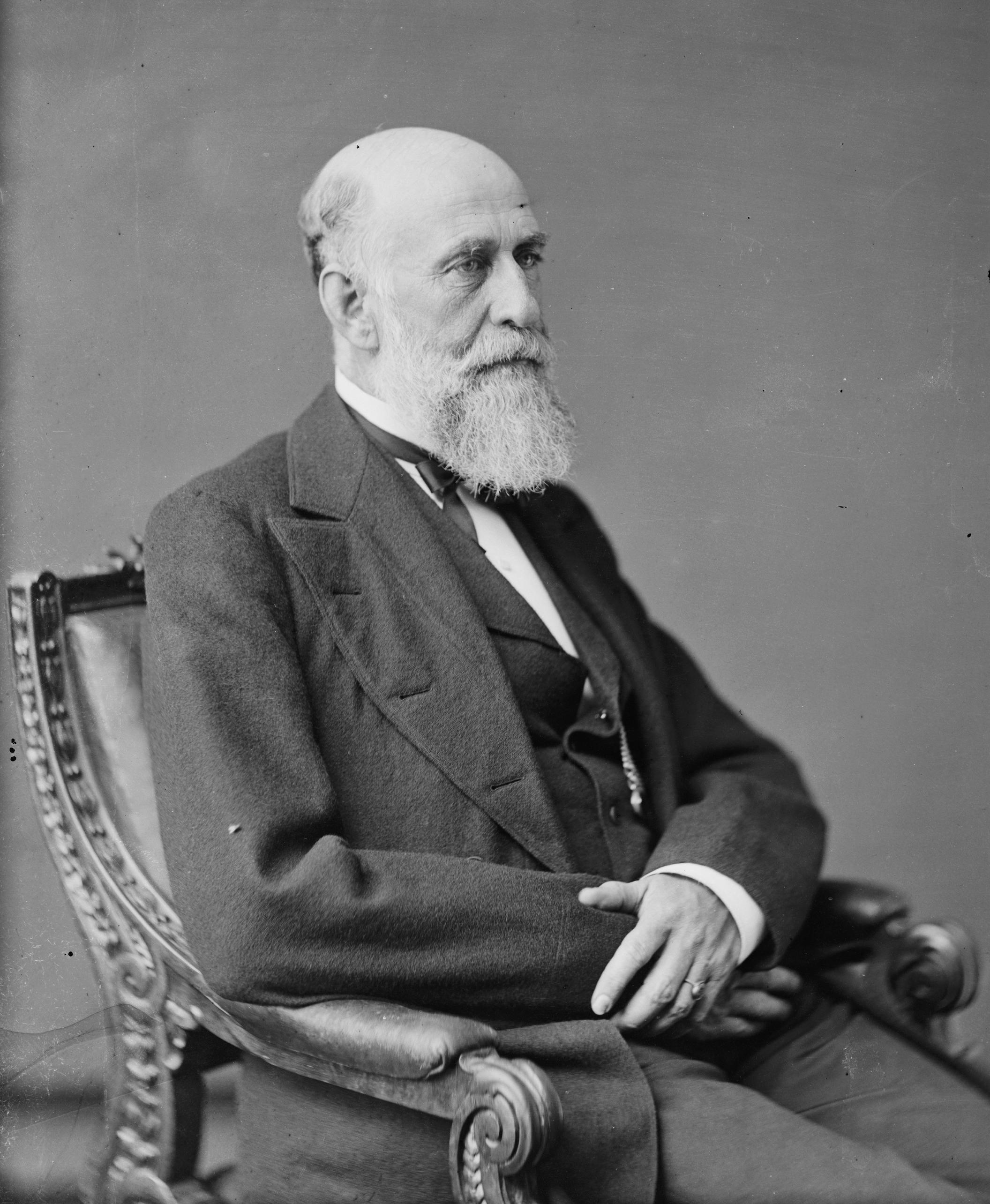

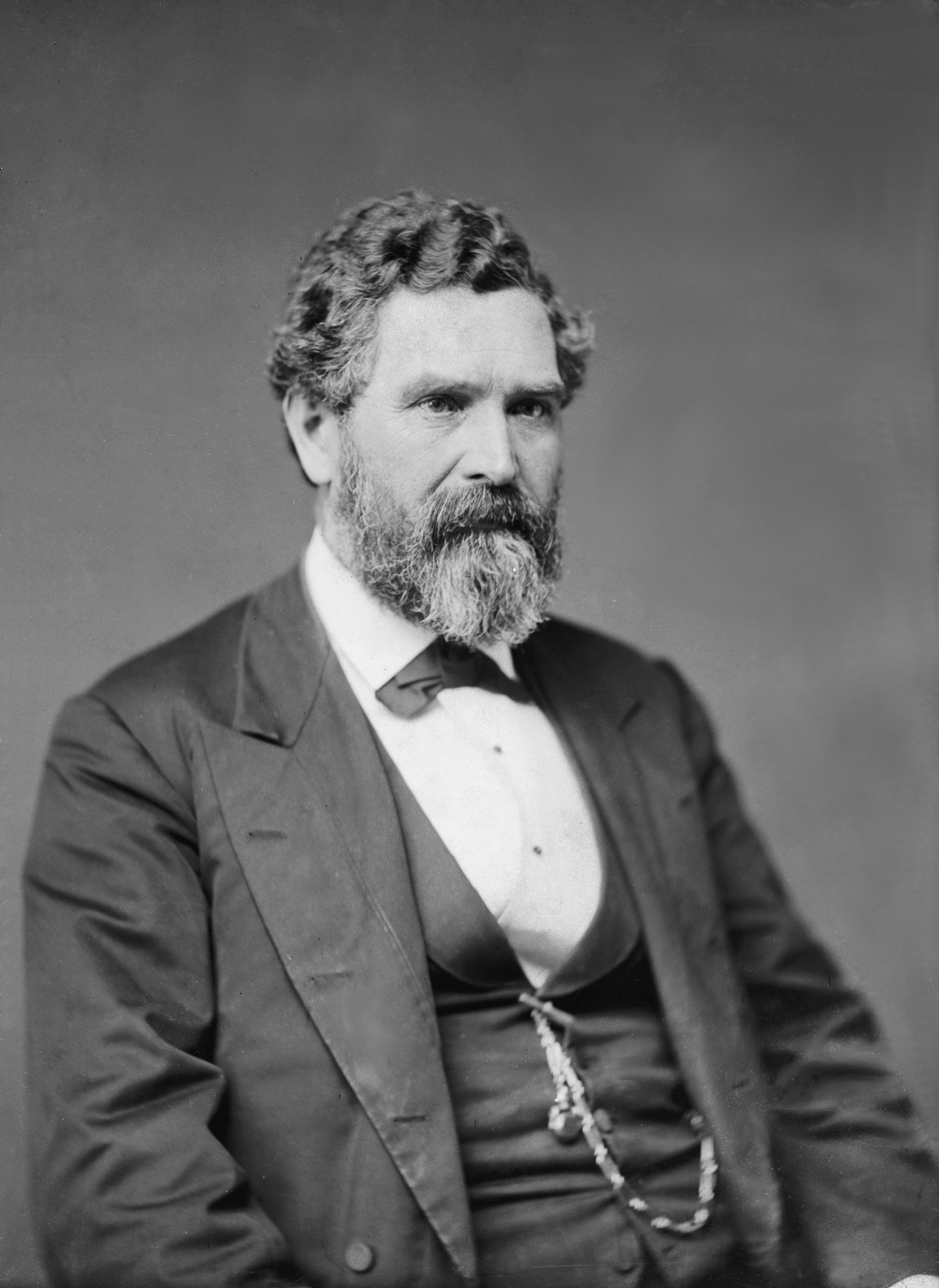

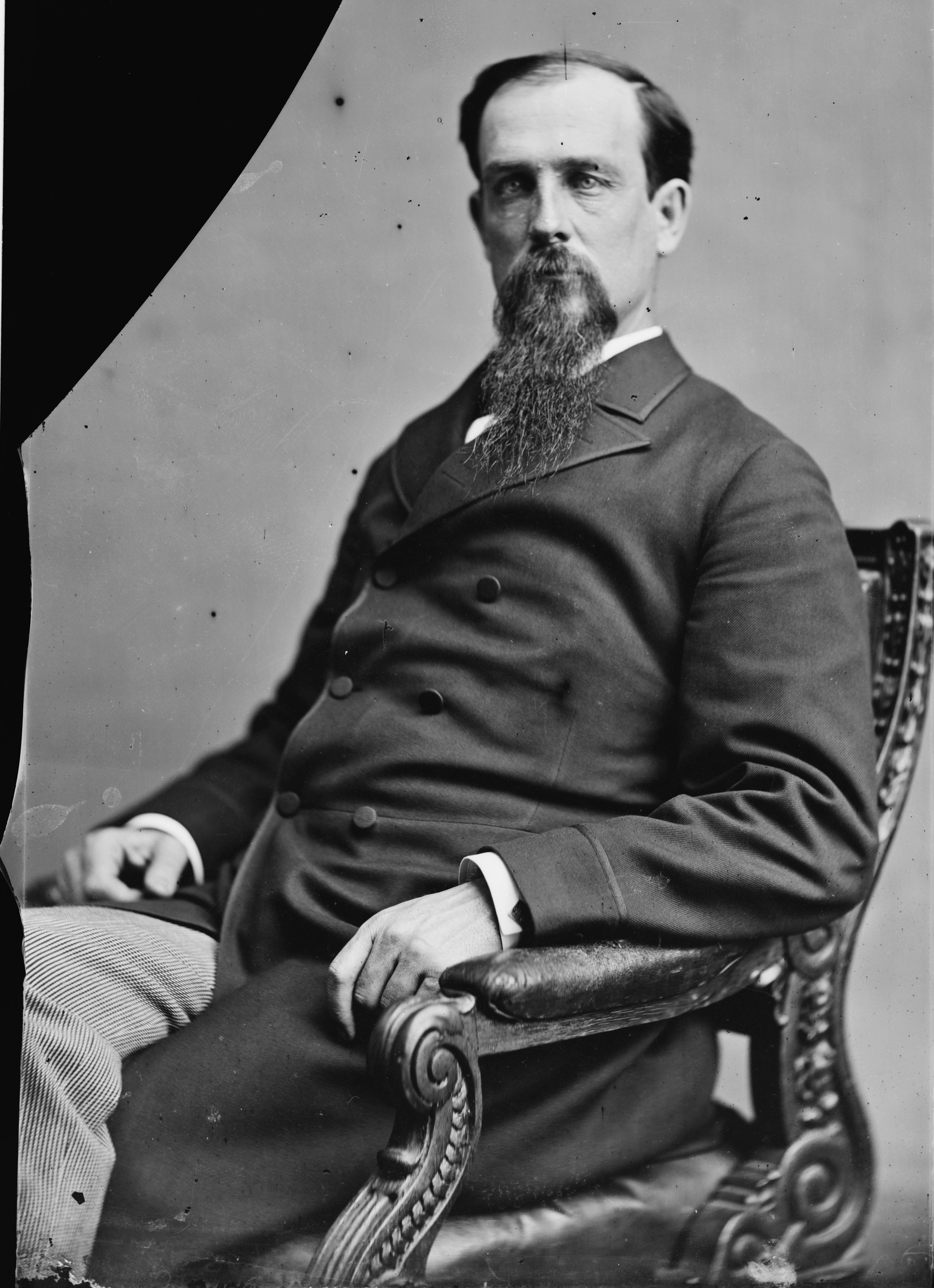
	Majority party	Minority party	Third party
Leader	George F. Edmunds (Note: as Republican Conference Chair)	James B. Beck (Note: as Democratic Caucus Chair)	Harrison H. Riddleberger (Note: as the leader of Readjuster Party) (retired)
Party	Republican	Democratic	Readjuster
Leader since	March 4, 1885	March 4, 1885	March 4, 1887
Leader's seat	Vermont	Kentucky	Virginia
Seats before	38	37	1
Seats after	38	37	0
Seat change	Steady	Steady	▼1
Seats up	12	13	1
Races won	12	13	0
- Results of the elections: Democratic gain Democratic hold Republican gain Republican hold Legislature failed to elect
Majority Party before election
Republican (Note: The Readjusters caucused with the Republicans.)
Elected Majority Party
Republican

The 1888–89 United States Senate elections were held on various dates in various states, coinciding with Benjamin Harrison's victory over incumbent President Grover Cleveland. As these U.S. Senate elections were prior to the ratification of the Seventeenth Amendment in 1913, senators were chosen by state legislatures. Senators were elected over a wide range of time throughout 1888 and 1889, and a seat may have been filled months late or remained vacant due to legislative deadlock. In these elections, terms were up for the senators in Class 2.

Both parties were unchanged in the regular elections, but later special elections would give Republicans an eightseat majority, mostly from newly admitted states.

== Results summary ==
Senate party division, 51st Congress (1889–1891)

- Majority party: Republican (39 to 51)
- Minority party: Democratic (37 to 35)
- Other parties: (0)
- Total seats: 76 to 88

== Change in Senate composition ==
=== Before the elections ===
D_{8}	D_{7}	D_{6}	D_{5}	D_{4}	D_{3}	D_{2}	D_{1}		
D_{9}	D_{10}	D_{11}	D_{12}	D_{13}	D_{14}	D_{15}	D_{16}	D_{17}	D_{18}
D_{28} Ran	D_{27} Ran	D_{26} Ran	D_{25} Ran	D_{24}	D_{23}	D_{22}	D_{21}	D_{20}	D_{19}
D_{29} Ran	D_{30} Ran	D_{31} Ran	D_{32} Ran	D_{33} Ran	D_{34} Ran	D_{35} Ran	D_{36} Ran	D_{37} Ran	RA_{1} Retired
Majority with Readjuster in caucus →									R_{38} Retired
R_{29} Ran	R_{30} Ran	R_{31} Ran	R_{32} Ran	R_{33} Ran	R_{34} Ran	R_{35} Ran	R_{36} Unknown	R_{37} Unknown	R_{38} Retired
R_{28} Ran	R_{27} Ran	R_{26}	R_{25}	R_{24}	R_{23}	R_{22}	R_{21}	R_{20}	R_{19}
R_{9}	R_{10}	R_{11}	R_{12}	R_{13}	R_{14}	R_{15}	R_{16}	R_{17}	R_{18}
R_{8}	R_{7}	R_{6}	R_{5}	R_{4}	R_{3}	R_{2}	R_{1}		

=== After the elections ===
D_{8}	D_{7}	D_{6}	D_{5}	D_{4}	D_{3}	D_{2}	D_{1}		
D_{9}	D_{10}	D_{11}	D_{12}	D_{13}	D_{14}	D_{15}	D_{16}	D_{17}	D_{18}
D_{28} Re-elected	D_{27} Re-elected	D_{26} Re-elected	D_{25} Re-elected	D_{24}	D_{23}	D_{22}	D_{21}	D_{20}	D_{19}
D_{29} Re-elected	D_{30} Re-elected	D_{31} Re-elected	D_{32} Re-elected	D_{33} Re-elected	D_{34} Re-elected	D_{35} Re-elected	D_{36} Re-elected	D_{37} Gain	V_{1} R Loss
Majority due to vacancy →									R_{38} Gain
R_{29} Re-elected	R_{30} Re-elected	R_{31} Re-elected	R_{32} Re-elected	R_{33} Re-elected	R_{39} Re-elected	R_{35} Hold	R_{36} Hold	R_{37} Hold	R_{38} Gain
R_{28} Re-elected	R_{27} Re-elected	R_{26}	R_{25}	R_{24}	R_{23}	R_{22}	R_{21}	R_{20}	R_{19}
R_{9}	R_{10}	R_{11}	R_{12}	R_{13}	R_{14}	R_{15}	R_{16}	R_{17}	R_{18}
R_{8}	R_{7}	R_{6}	R_{5}	R_{4}	R_{3}	R_{2}	R_{1}		

=== Beginning of the next Congress ===
D_{8}	D_{7}	D_{6}	D_{5}	D_{4}	D_{3}	D_{2}	D_{1}		
D_{9}	D_{10}	D_{11}	D_{12}	D_{13}	D_{14}	D_{15}	D_{16}	D_{17}	D_{18}
D_{28}	D_{27}	D_{26}	D_{25}	D_{24}	D_{23}	D_{22}	D_{21}	D_{20}	D_{19}
D_{29}	D_{30}	D_{31}	D_{32}	D_{33}	D_{34}	D_{35}	D_{36}	D_{37}	R_{39} Gain
Majority →									R_{39} Gain
R_{29}	R_{30}	R_{31}	R_{32}	R_{33}	R_{34}	R_{35}	R_{36}	R_{37}	R_{38}
R_{28}	R_{27}	R_{26}	R_{25}	R_{24}	R_{23}	R_{22}	R_{21}	R_{20}	R_{19}
R_{9}	R_{10}	R_{11}	R_{12}	R_{13}	R_{14}	R_{15}	R_{16}	R_{17}	R_{18}
R_{8}	R_{7}	R_{6}	R_{5}	R_{4}	R_{3}	R_{2}	R_{1}		

=== End of 1889 ===
									D_{1}
D_{11}	D_{10}	D_{9}	D_{8}	D_{7}	D_{6}	D_{5}	D_{4}	D_{3}	D_{2}
D_{12}	D_{13}	D_{14}	D_{15}	D_{16}	D_{17}	D_{18}	D_{19}	D_{20}	D_{21}
D_{31}	D_{30}	D_{29}	D_{28}	D_{27}	D_{26}	D_{25}	D_{24}	D_{23}	D_{22}
D_{32}	D_{33}	D_{34}	D_{35}	D_{36}	D_{37}	R_{45} New state	R_{44} New state	R_{43} New state	R_{42} New state
Majority →									R_{42} New state
R_{32}	R_{33} Hold	R_{34} Hold	R_{35}	R_{36}	R_{37}	R_{38}	R_{39}	R_{40} New state	R_{41} New state
R_{31}	R_{30}	R_{29}	R_{28}	R_{27}	R_{26}	R_{25}	R_{24}	R_{23}	R_{22}
R_{12}	R_{13}	R_{14}	R_{15}	R_{16}	R_{17}	R_{18}	R_{19}	R_{20}	R_{21}
R_{11}	R_{10}	R_{9}	R_{8}	R_{7}	R_{6}	R_{5}	R_{4}	R_{3}	R_{2}
									R_{1}

Key:

D_{#}	Democratic
RA_{#}	Readjuster
R_{#}	Republican
V_{#}	Vacant

== Race summaries ==
=== Special elections during the 50th Congress ===
There were no special elections during 1888 or in 1889 before March 4.

=== Races leading to the 51st Congress ===
In these regular elections, the winners were elected for the term beginning March 4, 1889; ordered by state.

All of the elections involved the Class 2 seats.

State	Incumbent			Results	Candidates
State	Senator	Party	Electoral history	Results	Candidates
Alabama	John T. Morgan	Democratic	1876; 1882	Incumbent re-elected in 1888.	▌ ✓ John T. Morgan (Democratic); [data missing]
Arkansas	James H. Berry	Democratic	1885 (special)	Incumbent re-elected in 1889.	▌ ✓ James H. Berry (Democratic); [data missing]
Colorado	Thomas M. Bowen	Republican	1882–83	Incumbent retired or lost re-election. New senator elected in 1889. Republican hold.	▌ ✓ Edward O. Wolcott (Republican); [data missing]
Delaware	Eli Saulsbury	Democratic	1870; 1876; 1883	Incumbent lost re-election. New senator elected in 1888 or 1889. Republican gain.	▌ ✓ Anthony C. Higgins (Republican); ▌Eli Saulsbury (Democratic); [data missing]
Georgia	Alfred H. Colquitt	Democratic	1883	Incumbent re-elected in 1888.	▌ ✓ Alfred H. Colquitt (Democratic); [data missing]
Illinois	Shelby M. Cullom	Republican	1882	Incumbent re-elected in 1888.	▌ ✓ Shelby M. Cullom (Republican); [data missing]
Iowa	James F. Wilson	Republican	1882	Incumbent re-elected January 25, 1888.	▌ ✓ James F. Wilson (Republican); ▌Thomas J. Anderson (Democratic); ▌Daniel Campbell (Unknown) (Note: Campbell, Reed, Hull, and Wallace each received between one and three votes.); ▌J. R. Reed (Unknown); ▌John A. T. Hull (Republican); ▌Henry C. Wallace (Republican)
Kansas	Preston B. Plumb	Republican	1877; 1883	Incumbent re-elected in 1888.	▌ ✓ Preston B. Plumb (Republican); [data missing]
Kentucky	James B. Beck	Democratic	1876; 1881	Incumbent re-elected January 10, 1888.	▌ ✓ James B. Beck (Democratic) 94; ▌ William O. Bradley (Republican) 31; ▌ A. H. Cardin (Labor) 1
Louisiana	Randall L. Gibson	Democratic	1882	Incumbent re-elected in 1889.	▌ ✓ Randall L. Gibson (Democratic); [data missing]
Maine	William P. Frye	Republican	1881 (special); 1883	Incumbent re-elected in 1889.	▌ ✓ William P. Frye (Republican); [data missing]
Massachusetts	George F. Hoar	Republican	1877; 1883	Incumbent re-elected in 1889.	▌ ✓ George F. Hoar (Republican); [data missing]
Michigan	Thomas W. Palmer	Republican	1882–83	Incumbent retired. New senator elected in 1889. Republican hold.	▌ ✓ James McMillan (Republican); [data missing]
Minnesota	Dwight M. Sabin	Republican	1883	Incumbent lost renomination. New senator elected in 1888. Republican hold.	▌ ✓ W. D. Washburn (Republican); [data missing]
Mississippi	Edward C. Walthall	Democratic	1885 (appointed); 1886 (special)	Incumbent re-elected in 1889.	▌ ✓ Edward C. Walthall (Democratic); [data missing]
Nebraska	Charles F. Manderson	Republican	1883	Incumbent re-elected in 1888.	▌ ✓ Charles F. Manderson (Republican); [data missing]
New Hampshire	William E. Chandler	Republican	1887 (special)	Unknown if incumbent retired or lost re-election. Legislature failed to elect. Republican loss. Gilman Marston (R) was appointed to start the next term and Chandler was later elected to finish the term; see below.	[data missing]
New Jersey	John R. McPherson	Democratic	1877; 1883	Incumbent re-elected in 1889.	▌ ✓ John R. McPherson (Democratic) 43; ▌ William J. Sewell (Republican) 38
North Carolina	Matt W. Ransom	Democratic	1872 (special); 1876; 1883	Incumbent re-elected in 1889.	▌ ✓ Matt W. Ransom (Democratic); [data missing]
Oregon	Joseph N. Dolph	Republican	1882	Incumbent re-elected in 1888.	▌ ✓ Joseph N. Dolph (Republican); [data missing]
Rhode Island	Jonathan Chace	Republican	1885 (special)	Incumbent re-elected in 1888.	▌ ✓ Jonathan Chace (Republican); [data missing]
South Carolina	Matthew Butler	Democratic	1876; 1882	Incumbent re-elected in 1888.	▌ ✓ Matthew Butler (Democratic); [data missing]
Tennessee	Isham G. Harris	Democratic	1877; 1883	Incumbent re-elected in 1889.	▌ ✓ Isham G. Harris (Democratic); [data missing]
Texas	Richard Coke	Democratic	1876; 1883	Incumbent re-elected January 23, 1889.	▌ ✓ Richard Coke (Democratic) 128
Virginia	Harrison H. Riddleberger	Readjuster	1881	Incumbent retired. New senator elected early December 20, 1887. Democratic gain.	▌ ✓ John S. Barbour Jr. (Democratic); [data missing]
West Virginia	John E. Kenna	Democratic	1883	Incumbent re-elected in 1889.	▌ ✓ John E. Kenna (Democratic); [data missing]

=== Elections during the 51st Congress ===
In these elections, the winners were elected in 1889 after March 4; ordered by election date.

State	Incumbent			Results	Candidates
State	Senator	Party	Electoral history	Results	Candidates
Rhode Island (Class 2)	Jonathan Chace	Republican	1885 (special); 1888	Incumbent resigned April 9, 1889. New senator elected April 10, 1889. Republican hold.	▌ ✓ Nathan F. Dixon III (Republican); [data missing]
New Hampshire (Class 2)	Gilman Marston	Republican	1889 (Appointed)	Interim appointee retired or lost election to finish the term. New senator elected June 18, 1889. Republican hold.	▌ ✓ William E. Chandler (Republican); [data missing]
South Dakota (Class 2)	None (new state)			South Dakota admitted to the Union November 2, 1889. First senators elected October 16, 1889, in advance of statehood. Republican gain.	▌ ✓ Richard F. Pettigrew (Republican) 108; ▌Bartlett Tripp (Democratic) 14; Absent/not voting 2
South Dakota (Class 3)	None (new state)			South Dakota admitted to the Union November 2, 1889. First senators elected October 16, 1889, in advance of statehood. Republican gain.	▌ ✓ Gideon C. Moody (Republican) 107; ▌Merritt H. Day (Democratic) 14
Washington (Class 1)	None (new state)			Washington admitted to the Union November 11, 1889. First senators elected November 20, 1889. Republican gain.	▌ ✓ John B. Allen (Republican); [data missing]
Washington (Class 3)	None (new state)			Washington admitted to the Union November 11, 1889. First senators elected November 20, 1889. Republican gain.	▌ ✓ Watson C. Squire (Republican); [data missing]
North Dakota (Class 1)	None (new state)			North Dakota admitted to the Union November 2, 1889. First senators elected November 25, 1889. Republican gain.	▌ ✓ Lyman R. Casey (Republican) 62; ▌Martin N. Johnson (Republican) 26; ▌Daniel W. Maratta (Democratic) 4
North Dakota (Class 3)	None (new state)			North Dakota admitted to the Union November 2, 1889. First senators elected November 25, 1889. Republican gain.	▌ ✓ Gilbert A. Pierce (Republican) 56; ▌Michael L. McCormack (Democratic) 6

== See also ==
- 1888 United States elections
  - 1888 United States presidential election
  - 1888 United States House of Representatives elections
- 50th United States Congress
- 51st United States Congress
