= Senator Chilton =

Senator Chilton may refer to:

- Horace Chilton (1853–1932), U.S. Senator from Texas from 1891 to 1892 and from 1895 to 1901
- William E. Chilton (1858–1939), U.S. Senator from West Virginia from 1911 to 1917
