= 1895 United States Senate election in Massachusetts =

- January 15, 1895

Resolution of legislature needed to win
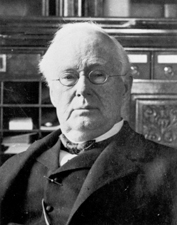

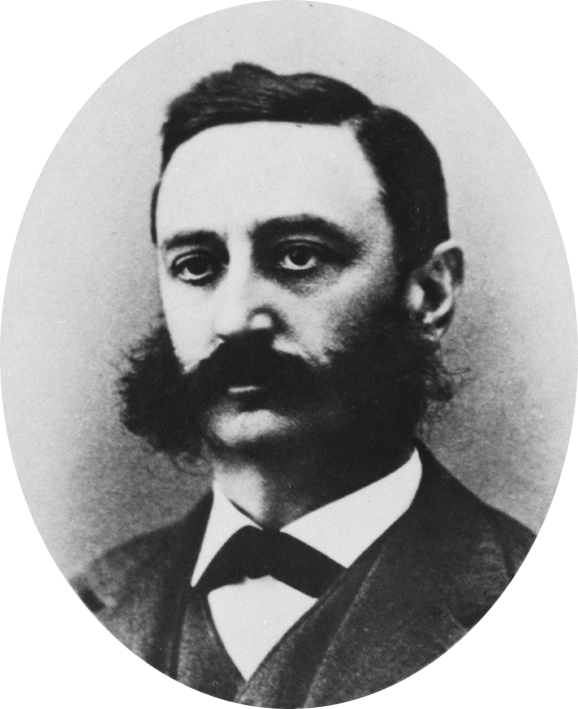
| Nominee | George Frisbie Hoar | John E. Russell |
| Party | Republican | Democratic |
| Senate | 34 | 4 |
| Percentage | 89.47% | 10.53% |
| House | 180 | 39 |
| Percentage | 82.19% | 17.81% |
Senator before election
George Frisbie Hoar
Republican
Elected Senator
George Frisbie Hoar
Republican

The 1895 United States Senate election in Massachusetts was held in January 1895. Incumbent Republican Senator George Frisbie Hoar was re-elected to a fourth term in office.

At the time, Massachusetts elected United States senators by a resolution of the Massachusetts General Court.

== Background ==
=== State legislature ===
At the time, the Massachusetts legislature was controlled by the Republican Party, as it had been since that party's founding, typically in dominant fashion. The 1894 election in particular, which coincided with the landslide election of Governor Frederic Greenhalge, returned the strongest Republican majority in 21 years.

The Senate was composed of 36 Republicans and only 4 Democrats, and the House had 194 Republicans and 45 Democrats.

== Candidates ==
- George Frisbie Hoar, incumbent U.S. Senator

Hoar faced no evident opposition from Republicans.

== Election ==
=== Caucuses ===
In caucuses held on January 9, Republicans re-nominated Hoar unanimously. Democrats, as a matter of party honors, nominated former U.S. Representative John E. Russell of Leicester, also unanimously.

=== Election ===
Both houses convened on January 15 and ratified Hoar's re-election along strict party lines, with many members not bothering to vote.

Election in the Senate
| Party | Candidate | Votes | % |
|---|---|---|---|
| Republican | George Frisbie Hoar (inc.) | 34 | 89.47% |
| Democratic | Patrick Collins | 4 | 10.53% |
| Total votes | | 38 | 100.00% |

Election in the House
| Party | Candidate | Votes | % |
|---|---|---|---|
| Republican | George Frisbie Hoar (inc.) | 180 | 82.19% |
| Democratic | Patrick Collins | 39 | 17.81% |
| Total votes | | 219 | 100.00% |
