= 1889 United States Senate election in Massachusetts =

- January 15, 1889

Resolution of legislature needed to win
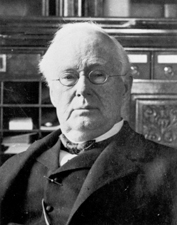

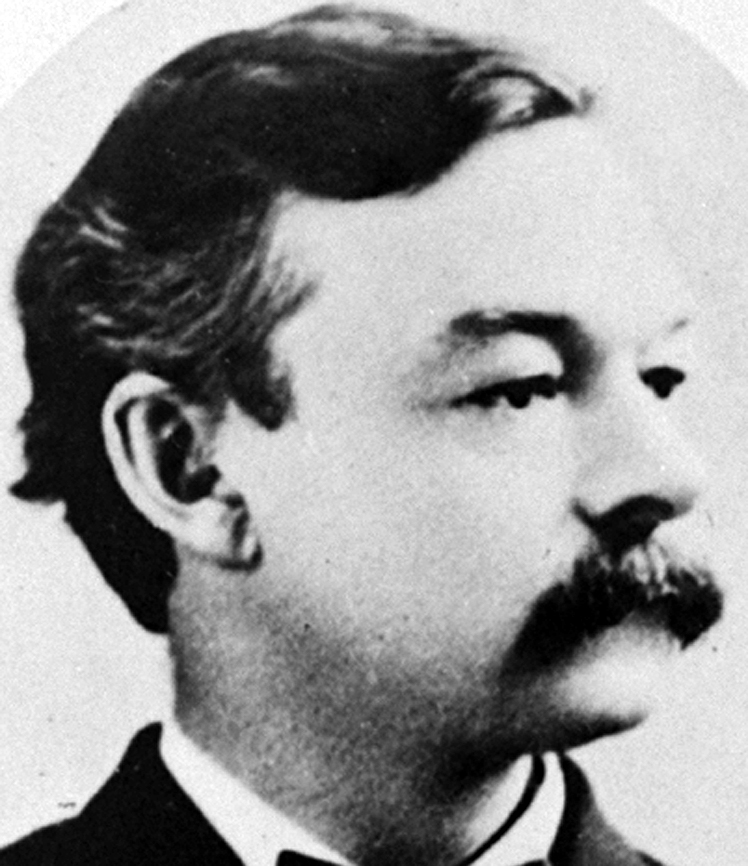
| Nominee | George Frisbie Hoar | Patrick Collins |
| Party | Republican | Democratic |
| Senate | 32 | 6 |
| Percentage | 84.21% | 15.79% |
| House | 171 | 56 |
| Percentage | 75.33% | 24.67% |
Senator before election
George Frisbie Hoar
Republican
Elected Senator
George Frisbie Hoar
Republican

The 1889 United States Senate election in Massachusetts was held in January 1889. Incumbent Republican Senator George Frisbie Hoar was re-elected to a third term in office with no serious opposition.

At the time, Massachusetts elected United States senators by a resolution of the Massachusetts General Court.

== Background ==
=== State legislature ===
At the time, the Massachusetts legislature was controlled by the Republican Party, as it had been since that party's founding, typically in dominant fashion. The 1888 election in particular, which coincided with the elections of President Benjamin Harrison and re-election of Governor Oliver Ames, returned the strongest Republican majority in eight years.

The Senate was composed of 33 Republicans and 7 Democrats, and the House had 181 Republicans, 58 Democrats, and 1 independent Democrat.

== Candidates ==
=== Declared ===
- George Frisbie Hoar, incumbent U.S. Senator

Though Hoar remained unpopular with some younger elements of the party, including those in control of the party State Committee, no Republican candidate was willing to actively put their name forward in opposition to his election. With the unanimous support of the Republican caucus, his re-election was guaranteed in advance. Democrats were expected to give an honorary vote to one of their party leaders, likely U.S. Representative Patrick Collins or Cambridge mayor William Russell, who had run as the party nominee for Governor in 1888.

== Election ==
=== Caucuses ===
In caucuses held on January 14, Republicans re-nominated Hoar unanimously. Democrats took two ballots to nominate Patrick Collins over William Russell.

First Democratic ballot
| Party | Candidate | Votes | % |
|---|---|---|---|
| Democratic | Patrick Collins | 21 | 44.68% |
| Democratic | William Russell | 21 | 44.68% |
| Democratic | John E. Russell | 3 | 6.38% |
| Scattering | Others | 2 | 4.26% |
| Total votes | | 47 | 100.00% |

Second Democratic ballot
| Party | Candidate | Votes | % |
|---|---|---|---|
| Democratic | Patrick Collins | 24 | 52.17% |
| Democratic | William Russell | 22 | 47.83% |
| Total votes | | 46 | 100.00% |

=== Election ===
Hoar was re-elected on January 15 in each house of the General Court, with the full support of his party.

Election in the Senate
| Party | Candidate | Votes | % |
|---|---|---|---|
| Republican | George Frisbie Hoar (inc.) | 32 | 84.21% |
| Democratic | Patrick Collins | 6 | 15.79% |
| Total votes | | 38 | 100.00% |

Election in the House
| Party | Candidate | Votes | % |
|---|---|---|---|
| Republican | George Frisbie Hoar (inc.) | 171 | 75.33% |
| Democratic | Patrick Collins | 56 | 24.67% |
| Total votes | | 227 | 100.00% |
