= 1882–83 United States Senate elections =

- Dates vary by state (Note: And other dates for special elections)
- Class 2

26 of the 76 seats in the United States Senate (with special elections) 39 seats needed for a majority
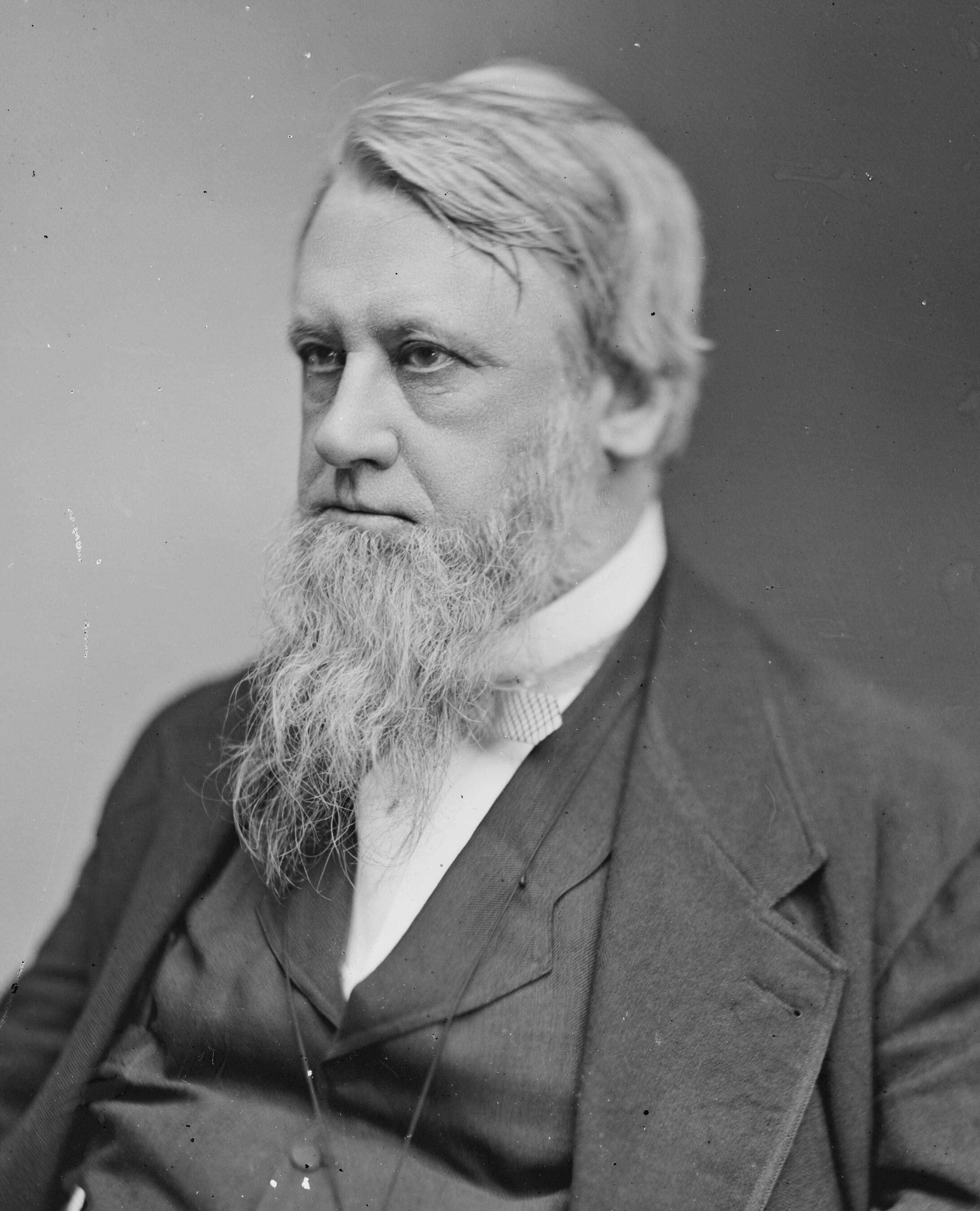

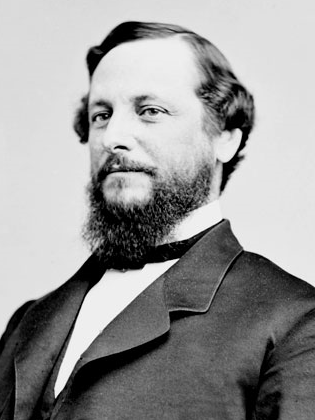

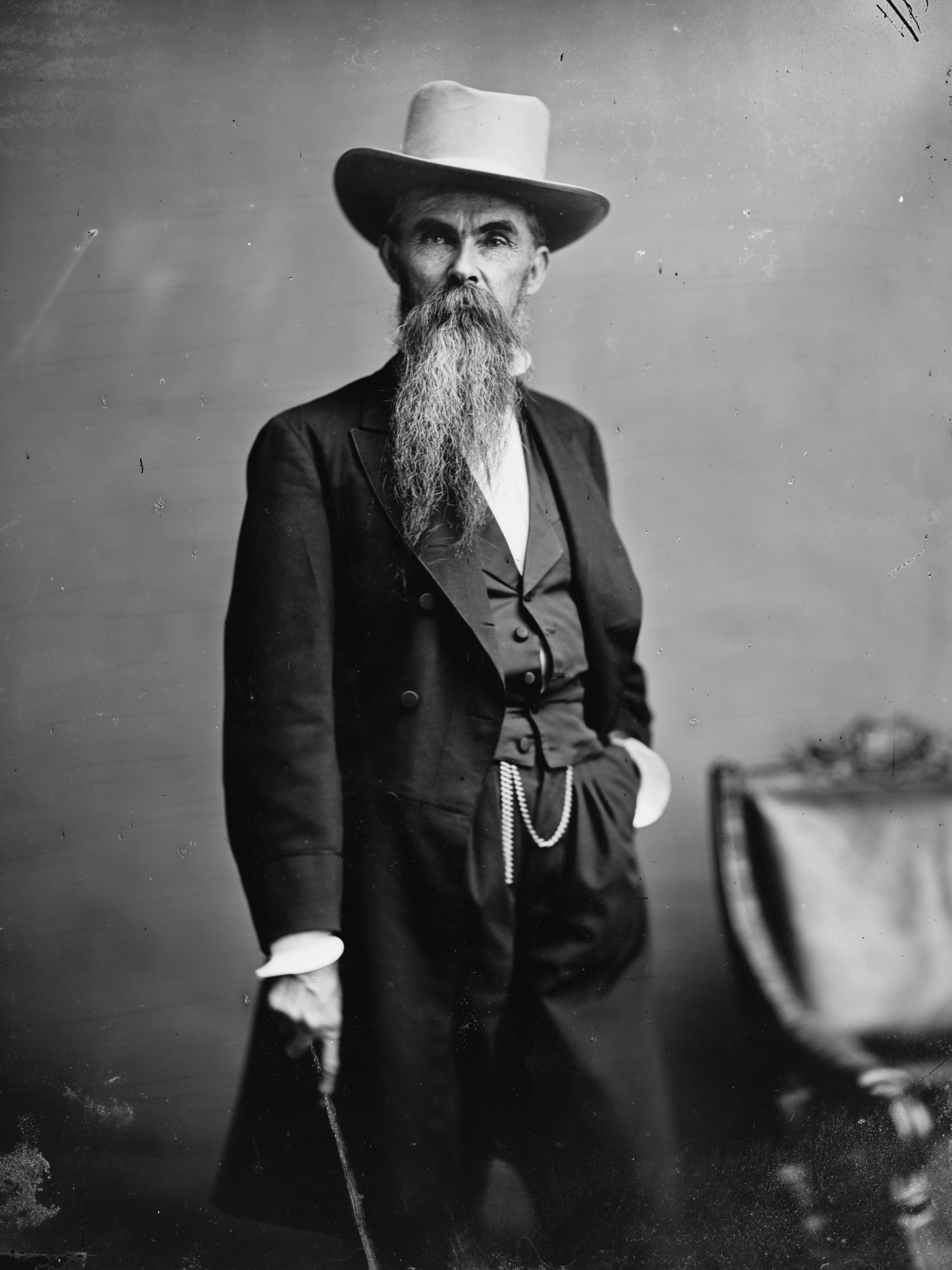
	Majority party	Minority party
Leader	Henry B. Anthony (Note: as Republican Conference Chair) (retired)	George H. Pendleton (Note: as Democratic Caucus Chair)
Party	Republican	Democratic
Leader since	March 4, 1863	March 4, 1881
Leader's seat	Rhode Island	Ohio
Seats before	37	37
Seats won	11	13
Seats after	37	36
Seat change	Steady	▼1
Seats up	11	14
	Third party	Fourth party
Leader	William Mahone (Note: as the leader of Readjuster Party)
Party	Readjuster	Independent
Leader since	March 4, 1881
Leader's seat	Virginia
Seats before	1	1
Seats won	1	0
Seats after	2	0
Seat change	▲1	▼1
Seats up	0	1
- Results of the elections: Democratic gain Democratic hold Republican gain Republican hold Readjuster gain Legislature failed to elect
Majority Party before election
Republican
Elected Majority Party
Republican

The 1882–83 United States Senate elections were held on various dates in various states. As these U.S. Senate elections were prior to the ratification of the Seventeenth Amendment in 1913, senators were chosen by state legislatures. Senators were elected over a wide range of time throughout 1882 and 1883, and a seat may have been filled months late or remained vacant due to legislative deadlock. In these elections, terms were up for the senators in Class 2.

The Republicans retained a narrow majority — 39 (and later 40) out of 76 seats — with the Readjusters in their caucus.

== Results summary ==
Colored shading indicates party with largest share of that row.

Parties					Total
Parties	Democratic	Independent	Readjuster	Republican	Total
Before these elections	37	1	1	37	76
Not up	23	0	1	26	50
Class 1 (1880/81 → 1886/87)	9	0	1	15	25
Class 3 (1878/79 → 1884/85)	14	0	0	11	25
Up	15	1	0	13	29
Regular: Class 2	14	1	0	11	26
Special: Class 1	0	0	0	0	0
Special: Class 2	1	0	0	2	3
Special: Class 3	0	0	0	0	0
Regular election
Incumbent retired	3	1	0	3	7
Held by same party	2	0	—	2	4
Replaced by other party	▼1 Independent replaced by ▲1 Republican ▼1 Republican replaced by ▲1 Democrat ▼1 Democrat replaced by ▲1 Republican				▲▼3
Result	3	0	0	4	7
Incumbent ran	11	0	0	8	19
Won re-election	10	0	0	4	14
Lost re-election and gained by other party	▼1 Democrat replaced by ▲1 Readjuster				▲▼1
Lost re-election without an elected successor	▼1 Republican lost and legislature failed to elect				▼1
Lost renomination but held by same party	0	0	0	3	3
Result	10	0	1	7	18
Total elected	13	0	1	11	25
Net change	▼1	▼1	▲1	Steady	▲▼3
Result	36	0	2	37	75

== Change in Senate composition ==
=== Before the elections ===
After the November 15, 1882 special election in Georgia.

D_{8}	D_{7}	D_{6}	D_{5}	D_{4}	D_{3}	D_{2}	D_{1}		
D_{9}	D_{10}	D_{11}	D_{12}	D_{13}	D_{14}	D_{15}	D_{16}	D_{17}	D_{18}
D_{28} Ran	D_{27} Ran	D_{26} Ran	D_{25} Ran	D_{24} Ran	D_{23}	D_{22}	D_{21}	D_{20}	D_{19}
D_{29} Ran	D_{30} Ran	D_{31} Ran	D_{32} Ran	D_{33} Ran	D_{34} Ran	D_{35} Retired	D_{36} Retired	D_{37} Retired	I_{1} Retired
Plurality, with Readjuster in caucus and VP tie-breaking vote ↓									RA_{1}
R_{29} Ran	R_{30} Ran	R_{31} Ran	R_{32} Ran	R_{33} Ran	R_{34} Ran	R_{35} Retired	R_{36} Retired	R_{37} Retired	RA_{1}
R_{28} Ran	R_{27} Ran	R_{26}	R_{25}	R_{24}	R_{23}	R_{22}	R_{21}	R_{20}	R_{19}
R_{9}	R_{10}	R_{11}	R_{12}	R_{13}	R_{14}	R_{15}	R_{16}	R_{17}	R_{18}
R_{8}	R_{7}	R_{6}	R_{5}	R_{4}	R_{3}	R_{2}	R_{1}		

=== After the elections ===
D_{8}	D_{7}	D_{6}	D_{5}	D_{4}	D_{3}	D_{2}	D_{1}		
D_{9}	D_{10}	D_{11}	D_{12}	D_{13}	D_{14}	D_{15}	D_{16}	D_{17}	D_{18}
D_{28} Re-elected	D_{27} Re-elected	D_{26} Re-elected	D_{25} Re-elected	D_{24} Re-elected	D_{23}	D_{22}	D_{21}	D_{20}	D_{19}
D_{29} Re-elected	D_{30} Re-elected	D_{31} Re-elected	D_{32} Re-elected	D_{33} Re-elected	D_{34} Hold	D_{35} Hold	D_{36} Gain	V_{1} R Loss	RA_{2} Gain
Majority, with Readjusters in caucus ↓									RA_{1}
R_{29} Re-elected	R_{30} Re-elected	R_{31} Hold	R_{32} Hold	R_{33} Hold	R_{34} Hold	R_{35} Hold	R_{36} Gain	R_{37} Gain	RA_{1}
R_{28} Re-elected	R_{27} Re-elected	R_{26}	R_{25}	R_{24}	R_{23}	R_{22}	R_{21}	R_{20}	R_{19}
R_{9}	R_{10}	R_{11}	R_{12}	R_{13}	R_{14}	R_{15}	R_{16}	R_{17}	R_{18}
R_{8}	R_{7}	R_{6}	R_{5}	R_{4}	R_{3}	R_{2}	R_{1}		

Key:

D_{#}	Democratic
I_{#}	Independent
RA_{#}	Readjuster
R_{#}	Republican
V_{#}	Vacant

== Race summaries ==
=== Special elections during the 47th Congress ===
In these elections, the winners were seated during 1882 or in 1883 before March 4; ordered by election date.

State	Incumbent			Results	Candidates
State	Senator	Party	Electoral history	Results	Candidates
Iowa (Class 2)	James W. McDill	Republican	1881 (appointed)	Interim appointee elected January 25, 1882. Winner did not run for re-election; see below.	▌ ✓ James W. McDill (Republican); ▌Moses M. Ham (Democratic); ▌Daniel Campbell (Unknown)
Georgia (Class 2)	Benjamin H. Hill	Democratic	1877	Incumbent died August 16, 1882. New senator elected November 15, 1882. Democratic hold. Winner did not run for re-election; see below.	▌ ✓ Pope Barrow (Democratic); [data missing]
Colorado (Class 2)	George M. Chilcott	Republican	1882 (appointed)	Interim appointee retired. New senator elected January 27, 1883. Republican hold. Winner did not run for re-election; see below.	▌ ✓ Horace Tabor (Republican); [data missing]

=== Races leading to the 48th Congress ===
In these general elections, the winners were elected for the term beginning March 4, 1883; ordered by state.

All of the elections involved the Class 2 seats.

State	Incumbent			Results	Candidates
State	Senator	Party	Electoral history	Results	Candidates
Alabama	John T. Morgan	Democratic	1876	Incumbent re-elected in 1882.	▌ ✓ John T. Morgan (Democratic); [data missing]
Arkansas	Augustus Garland	Democratic	1876	Incumbent re-elected in 1883.	▌ ✓ Augustus Garland (Democratic); [data missing]
Colorado	Horace Tabor	Republican	1883 (special)	Incumbent retired. Republican hold.	▌ ✓ Thomas M. Bowen (Republican); [data missing]
Delaware	Eli Saulsbury	Democratic	1870; 1876	Incumbent re-elected in 1883.	▌ ✓ Eli Saulsbury (Democratic); [data missing]
Georgia	Middleton P. Barrow	Democratic	1882 (special)	Incumbent retired. New senator elected in 1883. Democratic hold.	▌ ✓ Alfred H. Colquitt (Democratic); [data missing]
Illinois	David Davis	Independent	1876–77	Incumbent retired. New senator elected in 1882. Republican gain.	▌ ✓ Shelby M. Cullom (Republican); [data missing]
Iowa	James W. McDill	Republican	1881 (appointed); 1882 (special)	Incumbent retired. New senator elected January 25, 1882. Republican hold.	▌ ✓ James F. Wilson (Republican); ▌La Vega G. Kinne (Unknown); ▌Daniel P. Stubbs (Greenback)
Kansas	Preston B. Plumb	Republican	1877	Incumbent re-elected January 24, 1883.	▌ ✓ Preston B. Plumb (Republican) 127; ▌John Martin (Democratic) 20; ▌J. G. Bayne (Unknown) 12; ▌John A. Anderson (Republican) 3; ▌George W. Glick (Democratic) 1
Kentucky	James B. Beck	Democratic	1876	Incumbent re-elected December 6, 1881.	▌ ✓ James B. Beck (Democratic) 101; ▌ John D. White (Republican) 28; ▌ C. W. Cook (Greenback) 4
Louisiana	Joseph R. West	Republican	1876	Incumbent retired. New senator elected in 1882. Democratic gain.	▌ ✓ Randall L. Gibson (Democratic); [data missing]
Maine	William P. Frye	Republican	1881 (special)	Incumbent re-elected in 1883.	▌ ✓ William P. Frye (Republican); [data missing]
Massachusetts	George Frisbie Hoar	Republican	1877	Incumbent re-elected in 1883.	▌ ✓ George Frisbie Hoar (Republican); [data missing]
Michigan	Thomas W. Ferry	Republican	1871; 1877	Incumbent lost re-election. New senator elected in 1882 or 1883. Republican hold.	▌ ✓ Thomas W. Palmer (Republican); [data missing]
Minnesota	William Windom	Republican	1870 (appointed); 1871; 1877; 1881 (special)	Incumbent lost re-election. New senator elected in 1883. Republican hold.	▌ ✓ Dwight M. Sabin (Republican); [data missing]
Mississippi	Lucius Q. C. Lamar	Democratic	1876	Incumbent re-elected in 1883.	▌ ✓ Lucius Q. C. Lamar (Democratic); [data missing]
Nebraska	Alvin Saunders	Republican	1877	Incumbent lost re-election. New senator elected in 1883. Republican hold.	▌ ✓ Charles F. Manderson (Republican); [data missing]
New Hampshire	Edward H. Rollins	Republican	1876	Incumbent lost re-election. Legislature failed to elect. Republican loss.	None.
New Jersey	John R. McPherson	Democratic	1877	Incumbent re-elected in 1883.	▌ ✓ John R. McPherson (Democratic) 43; ▌Garret Hobart (Republican) 36; Others 2; [data missing]
North Carolina	Matt W. Ransom	Democratic	1872 (special); 1876	Incumbent re-elected in 1883.	▌ ✓ Matt W. Ransom (Democratic); [data missing]
Oregon	La Fayette Grover	Democratic	1882–83	Incumbent retired. New senator elected in 1882. Republican gain.	▌ ✓ Joseph N. Dolph (Republican); [data missing]
Rhode Island	Henry B. Anthony	Republican	1858; 1864; 1870; 1876	Incumbent re-elected in 1882.	▌ ✓ Henry B. Anthony (Republican); [data missing]
South Carolina	Matthew Butler	Democratic	1876	Incumbent re-elected in 1882.	▌ ✓ Matthew Butler (Democratic); [data missing]
Tennessee	Isham G. Harris	Democratic	1877	Incumbent re-elected in 1883.	▌ ✓ Isham G. Harris (Democratic); [data missing]
Texas	Richard Coke	Democratic	1876	Incumbent re-elected January 23, 1883.	▌ ✓ Richard Coke (Democratic) 128
Virginia	John W. Johnston	Democratic	1871; 1877	Incumbent lost re-election. New senator elected early December 21, 1881. Readjuster gain. Winner caucused with the Republicans.	▌ ✓ Harrison H. Riddleberger (Readjuster); ▌John W. Johnston (Democratic); [data missing]
West Virginia	Henry G. Davis	Democratic	1871; 1877	Incumbent retired. Democratic hold.	▌ ✓ John E. Kenna (Democratic); [data missing]

=== Elections during the 48th Congress ===
In this election, the winner was elected in 1883 after March 4.

State	Incumbent			Results	Candidates
State	Senator	Party	Electoral history	Results	Candidates
New Hampshire	Vacant			Legislature had failed to elect. New senator elected August 2, 1883. Republican gain.	▌ ✓ Austin F. Pike (Republican) 181; ▌Hiram Bingham III (Republican) 112; ▌Gilman Marston (Republican) 19; ▌Edward H. Rollins (Republican) 1; ▌William S. Ladd (Republican) 1; ▌Aaron F. Stevens (Republican) 1

== Iowa ==
On January 25, 1882, the Iowa General Assembly elected James W. McDill (Republican) to finish the term over Moses M. Ham and Daniel Campbell. James F. Wilson (Republican) was elected to the full six-year term on January 25, 1882, over La Vega G. Kinne and Daniel P. Stubbs.

== West Virginia ==
1883 United States Senate election in West Virginia
- January 23, 1883

Needed to win: Majority of votes cast in each House of the Legislature 62 votes cast in the House, 32 needed 26 votes cast in the Senate, 14 needed
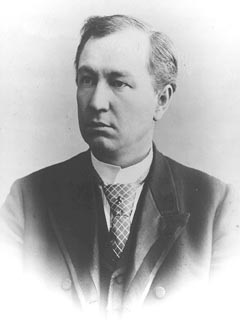

Candidate	John E. Kenna	George Loomis
Party	Democratic	Republican
House vote	37 votes 59.7%	22 votes 35.5%
Senate vote	17 votes 65.4%	7 votes 26.9%
U.S. senator before election
Henry G. Davis
Democratic
Elected U.S. Senator
John E. Kenna
Democratic

On January 23, 1883, each House of the West Virginia Legislature chose a senator to replace retiring incumbent, Henry G. Davis. In both chambers, the ballot was a three-way race between John E. Kenna, a Democratic congressman, George Loomis, a state judge and former state senator, and Berkeley County resident John Tabb Janney. In the House, the final count was 37 votes for Kenna, 22 votes for Loomis, and 3 votes for Janney. In the Senate, the final count was 17 votes for Kenna, 7 votes for Loomis, and 2 votes for Janney. Kenna, having received the majority of votes in both chambers, was declared duly elected as senator.

== See also ==
- 1882 United States elections
  - 1882 United States House of Representatives elections
- 47th United States Congress
- 48th United States Congress
