= Horace Chilton =

American politician (1853–1932)

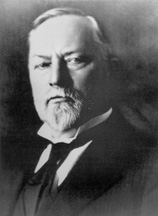

United States Senator from Texas
- In office June 10, 1891 – March 22, 1892
- Appointed by: Jim Hogg
- Preceded by: John H. Reagan
- Succeeded by: Roger Q. Mills
- In office March 4, 1895 – March 3, 1901
- Preceded by: Richard Coke
- Succeeded by: Joseph W. Bailey

Personal details
- Born: December 29, 1853 Tyler, Texas, U.S.
- Died: June 12, 1932 (aged 78) Dallas, Texas, U.S.
- Party: Democratic
- Spouse: Mary W. Grinnan (m. 1877; died 1924)

Horace Chilton (December 29, 1853 – June 12, 1932) was a printer, lawyer, and Democratic United States Senator from Texas.

== Biography ==
Chilton - a grandson of Thomas Chilton - was born near Tyler, Texas, and by age 18 was publishing the tri-weekly Tyler Sun newspaper. At 19 he was admitted to the bar and served as assistant attorney general of Texas between 1881 and 1883 and as a delegate to the Democratic national conventions of 1888 and 1896.

Appointed to the Senate upon John H. Reagan's resignation in 1891, Chilton was the first native Texan to serve in the United States Congress. Although he was defeated in the 1892 election for the seat, Chilton was elected to the Senate in 1894.

Chilton decided not to run for reelection in 1901, returning to practice law in Tyler and later Beaumont, Texas, where he worked with Spindletop oilfield operations. In 1906 he moved to Dallas, where he lived until his death.

The Horace Chilton papers are held in the Dolph Briscoe Center for American History in Austin, Texas.

== Personal life ==
Chilton married Mary W. Grinnan on February 20, 1877, and they had five or seven children. She died in 1924.

He died at his home in Dallas on June 12, 1932, and was buried at Oakwood Cemetery in Tyler.

U.S. Senate
Preceded by John H. Reagan	U.S. senator (Class 1) from Texas; 1891–1892; Served alongside: Richard Coke	Succeeded by Roger Q. Mills
Preceded by Richard Coke	U.S. senator (Class 2) from Texas; 1895–1901; Served alongside: Roger Q. Mills, Charles A. Culberson	Succeeded by Joseph W. Bailey
