= John M. Thurston =

American politician (1847–1916)

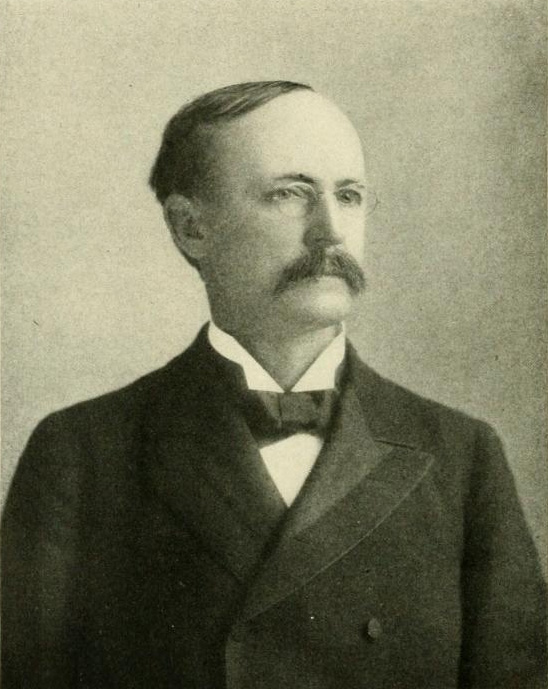

United States Senator from Nebraska
- In office March 4, 1895 – March 3, 1901
- Preceded by: Charles F. Manderson
- Succeeded by: Joseph Millard

Member of the Nebraska House of Representatives
- In office 1875–1877

Personal details
- Born: John Mellen Thurston; August 21, 1847 Montpelier, Vermont, US
- Died: August 9, 1916 (aged 68) Omaha, Nebraska, US
- Party: Republican

John Mellen Thurston (August 21, 1847 – August 9, 1916) was a United States Senator from Nebraska.

== Biography ==
Thurston was born in Montpelier, Vermont, the son of Daniel Sylvester Thurston and Ruth (née Mellen). He moved with his parents to Madison, Wisconsin, in 1854 and two years later to Beaver Dam, Wisconsin. He attended the public schools and graduated from Wayland University in Beaver Dam, where he studied law. Thurston was admitted to the bar in 1869 and commenced practice in Omaha, Nebraska. He was a city councilman from 1872 to 1874 and the city attorney of Omaha from 1874 to 1877. Thurston then served in the Nebraska House of Representatives from 1875 to 1877.

He married Martha L. Poland (1849–1898) in 1872. After her death in 1898, he married Leodora "Lola" Purman in 1899.

He was appointed assistant attorney of the Union Pacific Railroad in 1877 and general solicitor in 1888. He was a presidential elector on the Republican ticket in 1880. In 1893, Thurston was an unsuccessful Republican candidate for United States Senator; he was elected as a Republican to the United States Senate two years later and served from March 4, 1895, to March 3, 1901. During his term, Thurston served as the chairman of the U.S. Senate Committee on Indian Affairs (Fifty-sixth Congress). He was not a candidate for reelection in 1901. He was appointed as the United States commissioner to the St. Louis Exposition in 1901. He moved to Washington, D.C., and resumed the practice of law; then in 1915, Thurston returned to Omaha and joined Edwin T. Morrison and Joseph Crow in the law firm of Thurston, Crow & Morrison. He practiced law in Omaha until his death there on from heat prostration on August 9, 1916. His remains were cremated at Forest Lawn Cemetery in Omaha and the ashes were interred in the Congressional Cemetery, Washington, D.C.

Between 1885 and 1890, his portrait was painted in Omaha by artist Herbert A. Collins.

Thurston County, Nebraska is named after him.

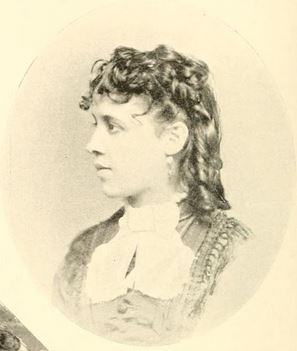
Martha S. Poland

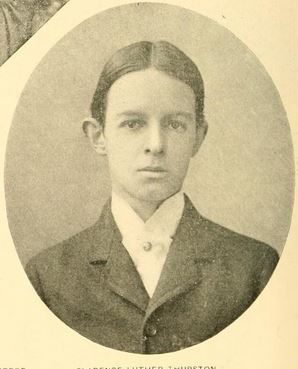
Clarence Luther Thurston, son of John Mellen Thurston

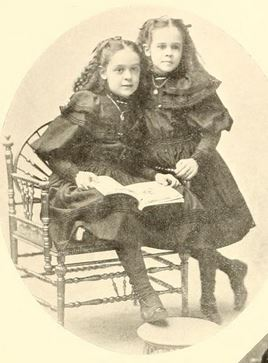
Grace and Jean Thurston, daughters of John Mellen Thurston

U.S. Senate
Preceded by Charles F. Manderson	U.S. senator (Class 2) from Nebraska; 1895–1901; Served alongside: William V. Allen, Monroe L. Hayward, William V. Allen	Succeeded by Joseph H. Millard
