= 1883 United States Senate election in Massachusetts =

- January 16–18, 1883

Majority of legislature needed to win
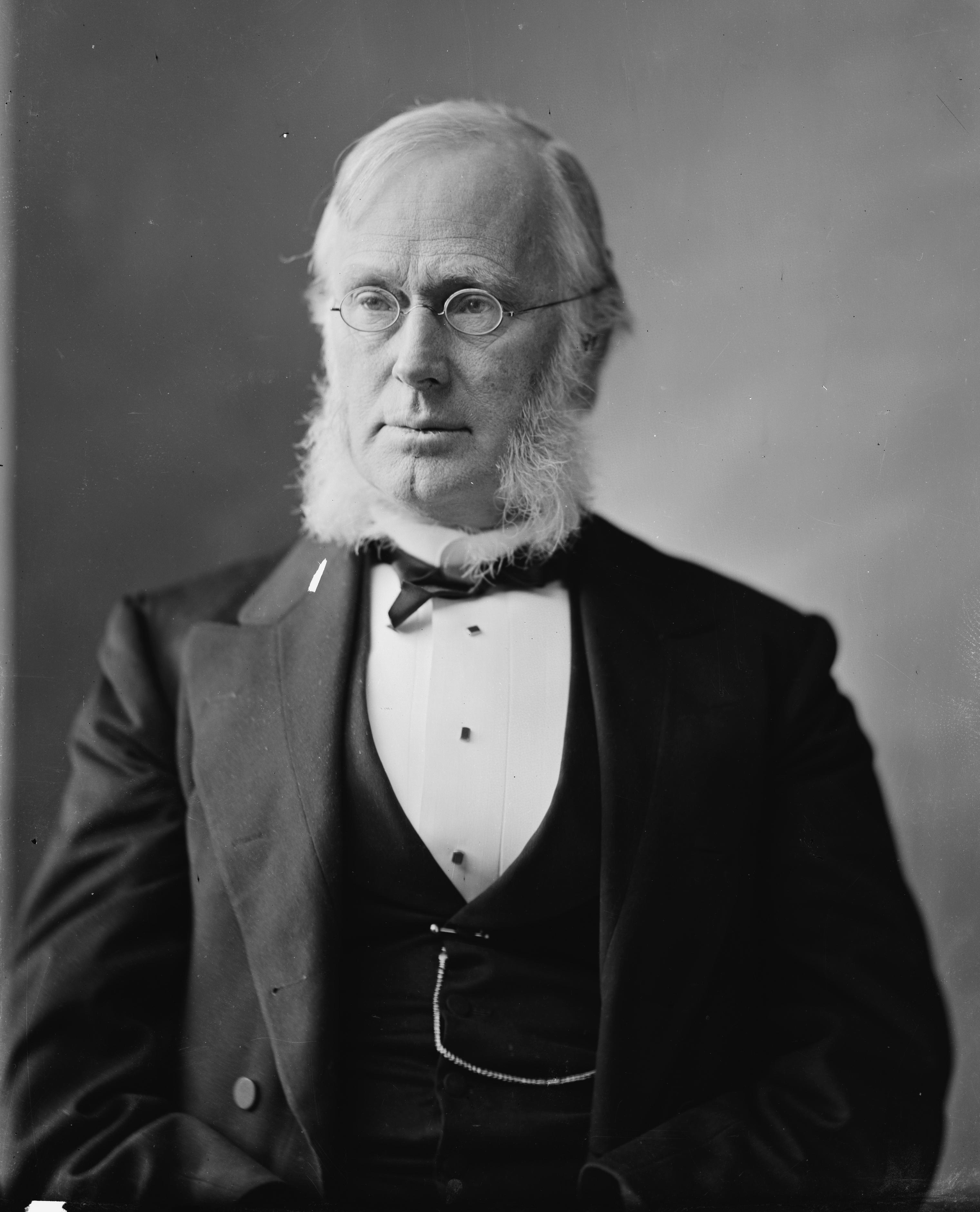

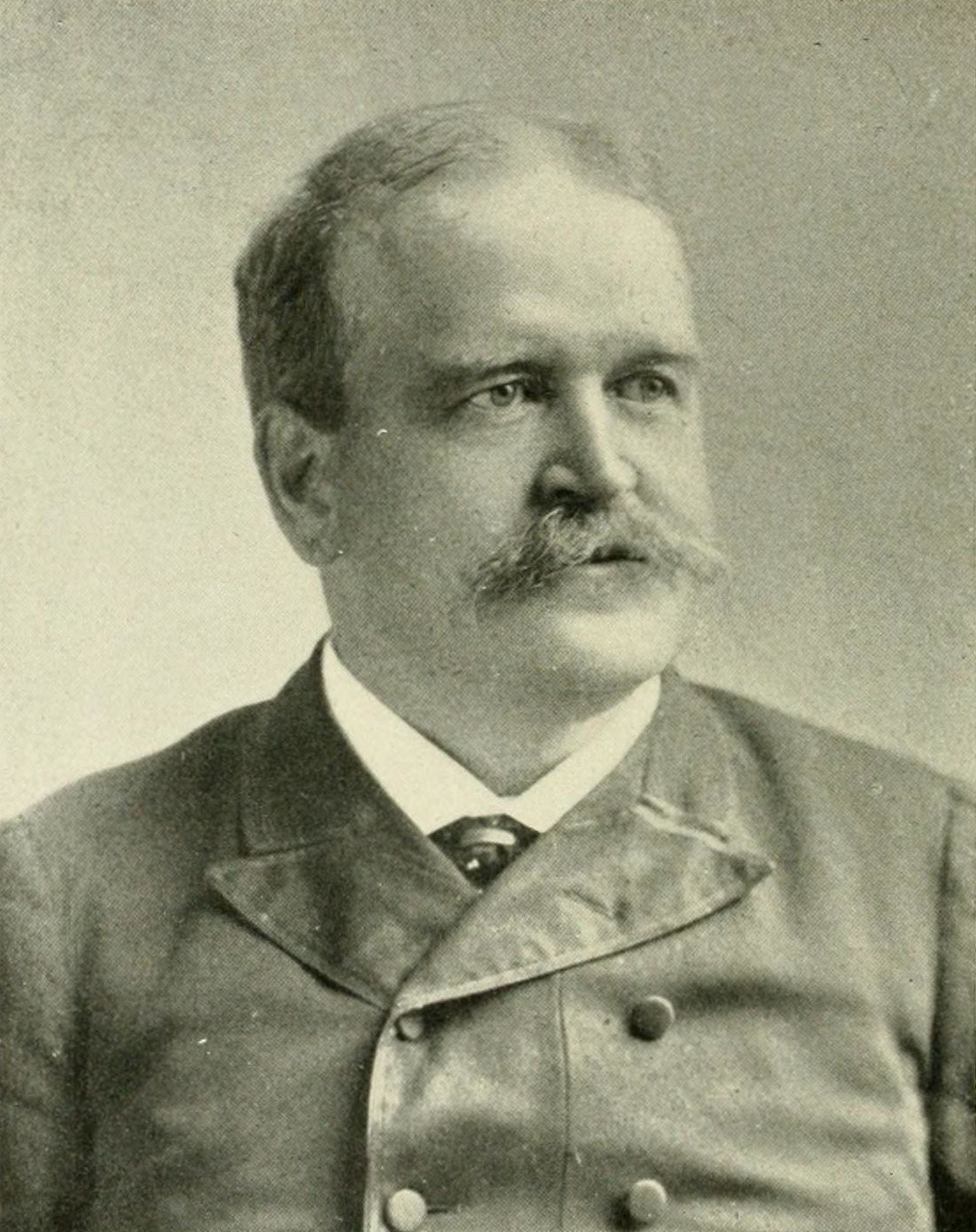
Nominee	George Frisbie Hoar	Samuel W. Bowerman	John Davis Long
Party	Republican	Democratic	Republican
Electoral vote	148	88	38
Percentage	54.61%	32.47%	14.02%
Senator before election
George Frisbie Hoar
Republican
Elected Senator
George Frisbie Hoar
Republican

The 1883 United States Senate election in Massachusetts was held in January 1883. Incumbent Republican Senator George Frisbie Hoar was re-elected to a second term in office despite a serious challenge from Democrats and members of his own party.

At the time, Massachusetts elected United States Senators by a resolution of the Massachusetts General Court.

== Background ==
=== State legislature ===
At the time, the Massachusetts legislature was controlled by the Republican Party, as it had been since that party's founding. However, 1883 was the high point of the Massachusetts Democratic Party in the latter half of the 19th century. The upcoming Senate election was a dominant issue in the 1882 legislature elections.

The Senate was composed of 22 Republicans and 18 Democrats, and the House had 151 Republicans, 84 Democrats, and 5 independents. Unless the Republicans could emerge unanimously in favor of one candidate, it was possible for the Democratic Party to choose the winner from among the Republican candidates.

=== Anti-Hoar sentiment ===
Incumbent George F. Hoar, who was elected in 1877 after a protracted four-day struggle, faced strong opposition from within the Republican Party. The anti-Hoar faction cited his icy and aloof demeanor, which had allegedly cost him any chance at influence in the Senate.

Harvard President Charles William Eliot was among those who called for Hoar's defeat.

Newly elected Democratic Governor Benjamin F. Butler, a former Republican, was also a bitter rival of Hoar, decreasing the chances that he could rely on Democratic votes. The Democratic party, now at its apex, also may have looked to defeat Hoar to weaken the unity of the Republicans in the long term. However, Governor Butler's inaugural address may have inflamed partisan tensions, leading many Republicans to return to Hoar's side.

=== Edmunds speech ===
Before the election, Hoar made a speech in which he excoriated his Republican Senate colleague George F. Edmunds for missing a minor vote; Edmunds had been at the deathbed of his teenage daughter and just returned from her funeral. Edmunds rose in response and choking back tears said, "The Senator knows I was not present at the session." Hoar attempted to apologize, but his speech was widely criticized in the Democratic press.

== Candidates ==
=== Declared ===
- William W. Crapo, U.S. Representative from New Bedford
- George F. Hoar, incumbent Senator
- John Davis Long, outgoing Governor of Massachusetts

The chief names offered by anti-Hoar faction were William W. Crapo and outgoing Governor John Davis Long, a candidate more friendly to the Butler Democrats and the younger "progressive" element in the Republican Party, including Henry Cabot Lodge and Oliver Ames. Any candidate faced the difficult task of uniting the disparate elements of the anti-Hoar faction, which included Democrats, Butler Republicans, and anti-reform Stalwarts.

=== Potential ===
The following candidates were mentioned as potential candidates or received votes, but did not openly declare their willingness or desire to be elected.

- Charles Francis Adams, Jr., author, business magnate, and reformer
- Theodore Lyman, U.S. Representative-elect from Brookline

=== Declined ===
- Benjamin F. Butler, Governor of Massachusetts

== Election ==
=== Republican conference (January 10) ===
There was some effort made by Long supporters to call for a binding caucus of the Republican legislators, but this effort was defeated at an informal conference. Speeches at the conference expressed favor for Senator Hoar.

=== January 16 ===
On the first day, balloting in the Senate dominated.

First, second, and third State Senate ballots
Party	Candidate	Votes	%
Republican	George Frisbie Hoar (inc.)	16	41.02%
Democratic	Samuel W. Bowerman	15	38.46%
Republican	John Davis Long	6	15.38%
Republican	William W. Crapo	2	5.13%
Total votes		39	100.00%

Fourth State Senate ballot
Party	Candidate	Votes	%	±%
Republican	George Frisbie Hoar (inc.)	16	41.02%	Steady
Democratic	Samuel W. Bowerman	12	30.77%	▼3
Republican	John Davis Long	9	23.08%	▲3
Republican	William W. Crapo	2	5.13%	Steady
Total votes		39	100.00%	

On the fifth ballot, Democrats abandoned Bowerman in favor of Long, giving him victory in the Senate.

Fifth State Senate ballot
Party	Candidate	Votes	%	±%
Republican	John Davis Long	21	53.85%	▲12
Republican	George Frisbie Hoar (inc.)	16	41.02%	Steady
Republican	William W. Crapo	2	5.13%	Steady
Total votes		39	100.00%	

In the House, a single ballot was taken, showing Hoar with a lead but 11 votes short of a majority.

First State House ballot
Party	Candidate	Votes	%
Republican	George Frisbie Hoar (inc.)	108	45.57%
Democratic	Samuel W. Bowerman	82	34.60%
Republican	John Davis Long	29	12.24%
Republican	William W. Crapo	10	4.22%
Democratic	Benjamin F. Butler	2	0.84%
Republican	Ambrose Ranney	2	0.84%
Republican	George D. Robinson	2	0.84%
Republican	Charles Francis Adams, Jr.	1	0.42%
Democratic	Edward Atkinson	1	0.42%
Total votes		237	100.00%

=== January 17 ===
On the second day, the two houses met in a joint convention. No candidates achieved a majority, but Hoar and Long each gained.

First joint ballot
Party	Candidate	Votes	%	±%
Republican	George Frisbie Hoar (inc.)	129	46.74%	▲5
Democratic	Samuel W. Bowerman	90	32.61%	▲8
Republican	John Davis Long	41	14.86%	▼9
Republican	William W. Crapo	11	3.99%	▼1
Scattering	Others	5	1.81%	▼5
Total votes		276	100.00%	

Second joint ballot
Party	Candidate	Votes	%	±%
Republican	George Frisbie Hoar (inc.)	131	46.74%	▲2
Democratic	Samuel W. Bowerman	81	29.35%	▼9
Republican	John Davis Long	49	17.75%	▲8
Republican	William W. Crapo	12	4.35%	▲1
Scattering	Others	3	1.09%	▼2
Total votes		276	100.00%	

After the second ballot, a motion for a third ballot was defeated by the Hoar faction 128–119. The Long supporters claimed that a third ballot would have given their man the victory.

=== January 18 ===
Third joint ballot
Party	Candidate	Votes	%	±%
Republican	George Frisbie Hoar (inc.)	148	54.61%	▲17
Democratic	Samuel W. Bowerman	88	32.47%	▲7
Republican	John Davis Long	38	14.02%	▼11
Republican	William W. Crapo	3	1.11%	▼9
Total votes		271	100.00%	
