= Charles F. Manderson =

American politician (1837–1911)

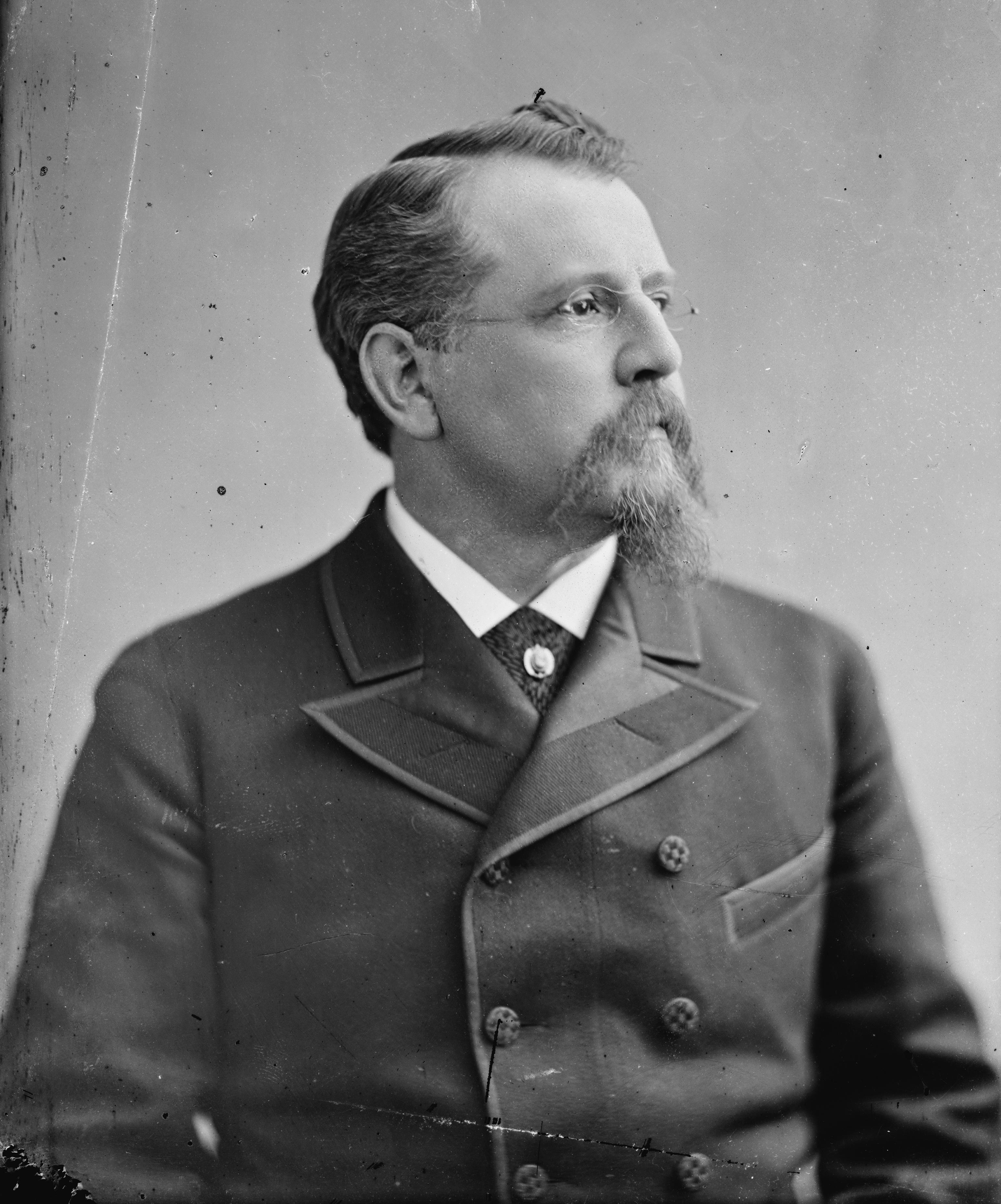
- Manderson, 1870–1880

President pro tempore of the United States Senate
- In office March 2, 1891 – March 22, 1893
- Preceded by: John James Ingalls
- Succeeded by: Isham G. Harris

United States Senator from Nebraska
- In office March 4, 1883 – March 3, 1895
- Preceded by: Alvin Saunders
- Succeeded by: John M. Thurston

Personal details
- Born: Charles Frederick Manderson; February 9, 1837 Philadelphia, Pennsylvania, US
- Died: September 28, 1911 (aged 74) Liverpool, England
- Party: Republican

Charles Frederick Manderson (February 9, 1837 – September 28, 1911) was a United States senator from Nebraska from 1883 to 1895.

== Biography ==
Born in Philadelphia, Pennsylvania, he attended school there and then moved to Canton, Ohio, in 1856, where he studied law. In 1859, he was admitted to the bar and commenced practice; in 1860, he was the city solicitor of Canton.

Manderson entered the Army during the Civil War as a first lieutenant, and rose through the ranks to resign as a colonel in 1865; he was also brevetted brigadier general of volunteers that year. He resumed the practice of law in Canton and was twice elected attorney of Stark County, Ohio.

In 1869, he moved to Omaha, Nebraska, and continued to practice law, and was the city attorney of Omaha for six years, as well as being a member of the State constitutional conventions in 1871 and in 1875. Manderson was elected as a Republican to the U.S. Senate in 1883, was reelected in 1888 and served from March 4, 1883, to March 3, 1895. During the Fifty-first, Fifty-second and Fifty-third Congresses, Manderson served as president pro tempore of the United States Senate. He was also chairman of the Committee on Printing in the Forty-eighth through Fifty-second Congresses.

Manderson was appointed general solicitor of the Burlington system of railroads west of the Missouri River, and was vice president of the American Bar Association in 1899 and president in 1900. He died on board the steamship Cedric in the harbor of Liverpool, England, on September 28, 1911, and was interred in Forest Lawn Cemetery, Omaha.

U.S. Senate
Preceded by Alvin Saunders	U.S. senator (Class 2) from Nebraska; March 4, 1883 – March 3, 1895; Served alongside: Charles H. Van Wyck, Algernon S. Paddock, William V. Allen	Succeeded by John M. Thurston
Preceded by John J. Ingalls	President pro tempore of the United States Senate; March 2, 1891 – March 22, 1893	Succeeded by Isham G. Harris
