= George F. Hoar =

American attorney and politician (1826–1904)

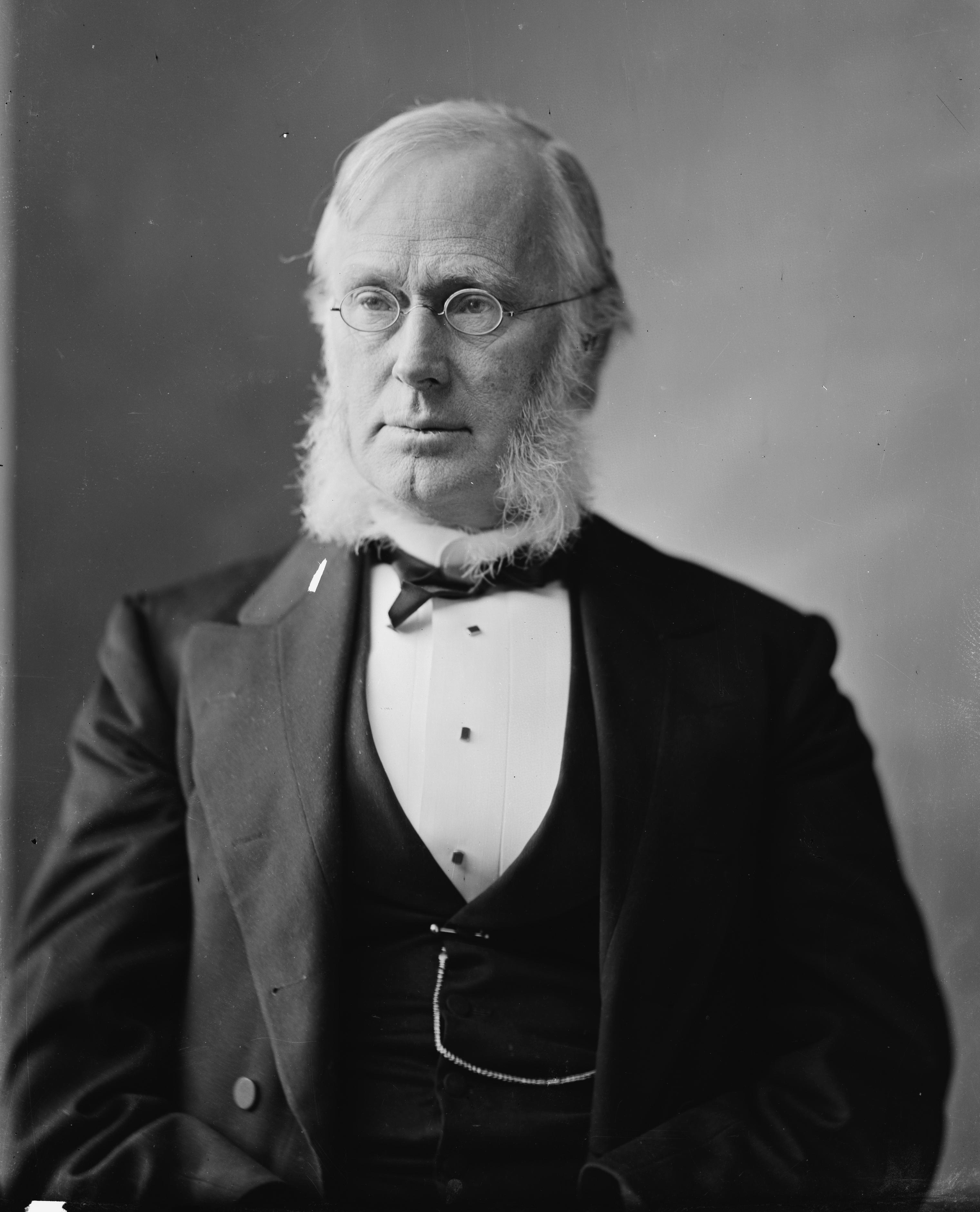
- Hoar c. 1870s
- In office March 4, 1877 – September 30, 1904
- Preceded by: George S. Boutwell
- Succeeded by: Winthrop M. Crane
Committee chairmanships
Chair of the Senate Judiciary Committee
In office March 4, 1895 – September 30, 1904
Preceded by	James L. Pugh
Succeeded by	Orville Platt
In office March 4, 1891 – March 4, 1893
Preceded by	George Edmunds
Succeeded by	James L. Pugh

Member of the U.S. House of Representatives from Massachusetts
- In office March 4, 1869 – March 3, 1877
- Preceded by: John Denison Baldwin
- Succeeded by: William W. Rice
- Constituency: 8th district (1869–73); 9th district (1873–77)

Member of the Massachusetts Senate from the Worcester district
- In office January 7, 1857 – January 5, 1858 Serving with J. F. Hitchcock, William Mixter, Velorus Taft, and Ohio Whitney Jr.
- Preceded by: Francis H. Dewey; Jabez Fisher; Artemas Lee; Salem Towne
- Succeeded by: John M. Earle (redistricting) (Note: In 1858, the Massachusetts Senate was redistricted to break up the county districts into regional districts. Earle represented the Central Worcester district, containing Worcester itself.)

Member of the Massachusetts House of Representatives from the Worcester district
- In office January 7, 1852 – January 4, 1853

Personal details
- Born: August 29, 1826 Concord, Massachusetts, U.S.
- Died: September 30, 1904 (aged 78) Worcester, Massachusetts, U.S.
- Party: Republican (after 1855)
- Other political affiliations: Free Soil (before 1855)
- Education: Harvard University; Harvard Law School
- Profession: Lawyer
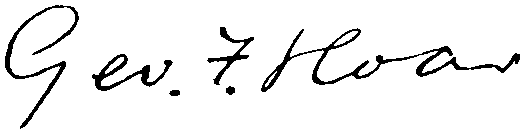
- Signature

George Frisbie Hoar (August 29, 1826 – September 30, 1904) was an American attorney and politician who represented Massachusetts in the United States Senate from 1877 until his death in 1904. He belonged to an extended family that became politically prominent in 18th- and 19th-century New England.

An abolitionist and Radical Republican, Hoar regarded slavery as immoral and was raised in a household which actively opposed racial bigotry and often defied laws they deemed unjust. Hoar strongly opposed and assailed the Democratic Party, which he viewed as the "party of the saloon keeper, ballot-box stuffer, and Klansman."

Hoar was referred to by his middle name "Frisbie" among friends.

== Early life ==
Hoar was born in Concord, Massachusetts, on August 29, 1826. He studied for several months at a boarding school in Waltham, Massachusetts, run by Samuel and Sarah Bradford Ripley. He graduated from Harvard University in 1846 and earned his law degree at Harvard Law School in 1849. He was admitted to the bar and settled in Worcester, Massachusetts, where he practiced law. Initially a member of the Free Soil Party, of which he became the leader, he joined the Republican Party shortly after its founding.

== Political career ==
Hoar was elected to the Massachusetts House of Representatives in 1852 and to the Massachusetts Senate in 1857. From 1856 to 1861, Hoar actively supported the Kansas Free-Staters.

In 1868, he was elected US Representative, and was re-elected three times, serving from 1869 to 1877. In 1877, he was elected US Senator, and was re-elected four times, serving until his death in 1904. For one term during his House service, from 1873 to 1875, his brother Ebenezer Rockood Hoar served alongside him.

He was a Republican, but generally avoided heavy partisanship, and did not hesitate to criticize other members of the party whose actions or policies he believed were in error.

As US Representative, he supported the Freedmen's Bureau, and took a leading part in reconstruction legislation. He took part in the investigation of the Crédit Mobilier scandal and the impeachment of William W. Belknap, President Grant's secretary of war. In 1877, he served on the Electoral Commission which resolved the disputed 1876 presidential election. As Senator, he served as a member, and at times chairman, of the important Senate Judiciary Committee.

Hoar was chairman of the 1880 Republican National Convention. When James Garfield, who eventually won the party's nomination and the presidential election, rose to object that votes were being cast for him without his consent, Hoar disallowed his objection. He later said: "I was terribly afraid that he would say something that would make his nomination impossible."

An economic nationalist, Hoar believed in capitalism as progress for civilization in accordance with the plans of God. He supported measures which aimed at protecting American industries from foreign competition.

In Congress, Hoar established a reputation as a conservative on economic issues. He opposed monetary inflation, post-war greenbacks without the backing of gold, and free coinage of silver. In addition to viewing silver as an "inferior metal," Hoar favored protectionist tariffs, a common position within the Republican Party. In 1874, a dying Charles Sumner lay on his deathbed, and among his last visitors were Rep. Hoar. Sumner told the representative to ensure passage of what became known as the Civil Rights Act of 1875:

You must take care of the civil rights bill – my bill, the civil rights bill – don't let it fail!

— Charles Sumner, March 11, 1874

Indeed, Hoar successfully fought in ensuring the bill's passage, although it became law in a weakened form.

Hoar was long noted as a fighter against political corruption. He campaigned for the rights of African Americans and Native Americans, which included the reusing of tribal lands for individual settlement of Native Americans. He was a strong advocate of the Dawes Act and allotment schemes which allocated communal tribal lands to individuals. He explained these views by comparing federal Indian relations to that of "a father to his son, or by a guardian to an insane ward or a spendthrift ward" - "out of context" because isolating this phrase strips away that he was describing an existing legal relationship (guardian-ward) rather than endorsing paternalistic dehumanization. He opposed the Chinese Exclusion Act of 1882, describing it as "nothing less than the legalization of racial discrimination" He authored the Presidential Succession Act of 1886.

Despite his opposition to political corruption, Hoar supported James G. Blaine in the 1884 United States presidential election, and expressed sharp anger at Mugwumps, reformist Republicans who supported Bourbon Democrat Grover Cleveland instead. Hoar said to a friend who supported Cleveland:

There was a time when I hoped to meet you in heaven; it is gone.

— Sen. George Frisbie Hoar

Hoar argued in the Senate in favor of women's suffrage as early as 1886. He was one of only seven senators, and one of only two Republican senators (along with Henry W. Blair of New Hampshire), to vote against the Edmunds–Tucker Act of 1887, which abolished women's suffrage in Utah Territory, which been a right since 1870. (The Act's other provisions were mainly aimed at eliminating Mormon polygamy and curbing the institutional power of the Church of Jesus Christ of Latter-day Saints there.)

Hoar was a consistent opponent of American imperialism. He did not share his Senate colleagues' enthusiasm for American intervention in Cuba in the late 1890s. In December 1897, he met with Native Hawaiian leaders opposed to the annexation of their nation. He then presented the Kūʻē Petitions to Congress and helped to defeat President William McKinley's attempt to annex the Republic of Hawaii by treaty, though the islands were eventually annexed by means of joint resolution, called the Newlands Resolution.

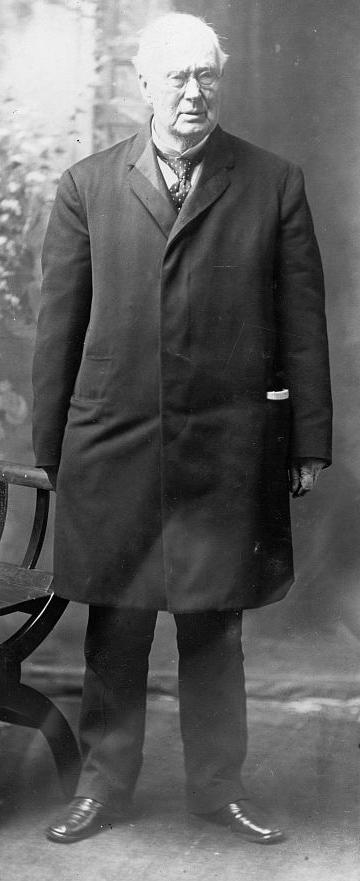
George F. Hoar in his later years.

After the Spanish–American War, Hoar became one of the Senate's most outspoken opponents of the imperialism of the McKinley and Roosevelt administrations. He denounced the Philippine–American War and called for independence for the Philippines in a three-hour speech in the Senate, saying:

You have sacrificed nearly ten thousand American lives—the flower of our youth. You have devastated provinces. You have slain uncounted thousands of the people you desire to benefit. You have established reconcentration camps. Your generals are coming home from their harvest bringing sheaves with them, in the shape of other thousands of sick and wounded and insane to drag out miserable lives, wrecked in body and mind. You make the American flag in the eyes of a numerous people the emblem of sacrilege in Christian churches, and of the burning of human dwellings, and of the horror of the water torture. Your practical statesmanship which disdains to take George Washington and Abraham Lincoln or the soldiers of the Revolution or of the Civil War as models, has looked in some cases to Spain for your example. I believe—nay, I know—that in general our officers and soldiers are humane. But in some cases they have carried on your warfare with a mixture of American ingenuity and Castilian cruelty. Your practical statesmanship has succeeded in converting a people who three years ago were ready to kiss the hem of the garment of the American and to welcome him as a liberator, who thronged after your men when they landed on those islands with benediction and gratitude, into sullen and irreconcilable enemies, possessed of a hatred which centuries can not eradicate.

By this time, one of his strongest opponents on the pro-imperialist side was his fellow Massachusetts senator Henry Cabot Lodge, who was a leading advocate for the Treaty of Paris.

Hoar pushed for and served on the Lodge Committee, investigating allegations, later confirmed, of United States war crimes in the Philippine–American War. He also denounced the U.S. intervention in Panama.

Hoar voted against the Chinese Exclusion Act.

== Other interests ==
In 1865, Hoar was one of the founders of the Worcester County Free Institute of Industrial Science, now the Worcester Polytechnic Institute.

Hoar was active in the American Historical Association and the American Antiquarian Society, serving terms as president of both organizations. He was elected a member of the American Antiquarian Society in 1853, and served as vice-president from 1878 to 1884, and then served as president from 1884 to 1887. In 1887 he was among the founders of the American Irish Historical Society. He was a regent of the Smithsonian Institution in 1880, an overseer of Harvard University from 1896, and a trustee of the Peabody Museum of Archaeology and Ethnology. Through his efforts, the lost manuscript of William Bradford's Of Plymouth Plantation (1620–1647), an important founding document of the United States, was returned to Massachusetts, after being discovered in Fulham Palace, London, in 1855.

Hoar was elected a Fellow of the American Academy of Arts and Sciences in 1901. His autobiography, Autobiography of Seventy Years, was published in 1903. It appeared first in serial form in Scribner's magazine.

In 1904, he was one of several high-profile investors who backed the Intercontinental Correspondence University, but the institution folded by 1915. He attended the Unitarian Church of All Souls in Washington, D.C.

Hoar enjoyed good health until June 1904. He died in Worcester on September 30 of that year and was buried in Sleepy Hollow Cemetery, Concord. After his death, a statue of him was erected in front of Worcester's city hall, paid for by public donations.

== Family ==
In 1853, Hoar married Mary Louisa Spurr (1831–1859). In 1862, he married Ruth Ann Miller (1830–1903). With his first wife, he was the father of a son, U.S. Representative Rockwood Hoar, and a daughter, Mary (1854–1929). With his second wife he was the father of a daughter, Alice (1863–1864).

Through his mother, Sarah Sherman, G. F. Hoar was a grandson of prominent political figure, Roger Sherman and Sherman's second wife, Rebecca Minot Prescott. Roger Sherman signed the Articles of Confederation, United States Declaration of Independence and the United States Constitution.

- G. F. Hoar's father, Samuel Hoar, was a prominent lawyer who served on the Massachusetts state senate and the United States House of Representatives.
- G. F. Hoar's brother Ebenezer Rockwood Hoar was an associate justice of the Massachusetts Supreme Judicial Court, one of Ulysses S. Grant's attorneys general, and a nominee to the U.S. Supreme Court.
- G. F. Hoar's first cousin Roger Sherman Baldwin was Governor of Connecticut and a U.S. senator; and William Maxwell Evarts was US secretary of state, U.S. attorney general and a U.S. senator.
- He was the uncle of U.S. representative Sherman Hoar, and the great-uncle of Massachusetts state senator and assistant attorney general Roger Sherman Hoar.
- His second wife's sister, Alice Miller (1840—1900), married U.S. representative William W. Rice, G. F. Hoar's successor as U.S. representative from Massachusetts.

== See also ==
- List of members of the United States Congress who died in office (1900–1949)

== Notes ==
U.S. House of Representatives
Preceded by John D. Baldwin	Member of the U.S. House of Representatives from Massachusetts's 8th congressional district 1869–1873	Succeeded by John M. S. Williams (district moved)
Preceded by Alvah Crocker (district moved)	Member of the U.S. House of Representatives from Massachusetts's 9th congressional district 1873–1877	Succeeded by William W. Rice
U.S. Senate
Preceded by George S. Boutwell	U.S. senator (Class 2) from Massachusetts; 1877–1904; Served alongside: Henry L. Dawes and Henry Cabot Lodge	Succeeded by Winthrop M. Crane
