= List of first women lawyers and judges in Indiana =

List of American women lawyers and judges in Indiana

This is a list of the first women lawyer(s) and judge(s) in Indiana. It includes the year in which the women were admitted to practice law (in parentheses). Also included are women who achieved other distinctions such becoming the first in their state to graduate from law school or become a political figure.

== Firsts in Indiana's history ==
=== Lawyers ===
- First female: Elizabeth Eaglesfield (1875)
- First female admitted to practice law after appealing to the Indiana Supreme Court: Antoinette Dakin Leach (1893)
- First female lawyer to practice before the Indiana Supreme Court: Caroline B. Hendricks (1895) c. 1897
- First all-female law firm owners: Adele Ida Storck and Minnie Elizabeth Mason (1921)
- First African American female: Helen Elsie Austin (1930)
- First Asian American female (Filipino descent): Lourdes Dellota Alba (1966)
- First Latino American (female; partner at a major Indiana law firm): Marisol Sanchez (2002)
- First Burmese American (female): Lun Kham Pieper (2009)

=== State judges ===
- First female: Ella Groninger in 1919
- First female (elected): V. Sue Shields in 1964
- First female (county court): Linda Lucille Chezem in 1975
- First African American female: Phyllis Senegal (1975)
- First female (Indiana Court of Appeals): V. Sue Shields in 1978
- First female (circuit court): Linda Lucille Chezem in 1982
- First (African American) female (Indiana Supreme Court): Myra C. Selby (1995)
- First female (Chief Justice; Indiana Supreme Court): Loretta Rush in 2014
- First females (Commercial court): Maria Grainger and Heather A. Welch in 2016

=== Federal judges ===
- First female (U.S. District Court for the Southern District of Indiana): Sarah Evans Barker (1984)
- First African American (female) (U.S. District Court for the Southern District of Indiana): Tanya Walton Pratt (2010)
- First female (Bankruptcy Court; U.S. District Court for the Southern District of Indiana): Robyn Moberly (2012)
- First African American (female) from Indiana (United States Court of Appeals for the Seventh Circuit): Doris Pryor (2022)
- First African American (female) (U.S. District Court for the Northern District of Indiana): Cristal C. Brisco in 2024

=== Attorney General of Indiana ===
- First (African American) female: Pamela Carter from 1993 to 1997

=== Public Defender ===
- First (African American) female: Harriette Bailey Conn in 1970

=== United States Attorney ===
- First female (U.S. Attorney for the Southern District of Indiana; full term): Virginia Dill McCarty (1977) from 1977 to 1981
- First female (Northern District of Indiana; Acting): Tina L. Nommay in 2021

=== Assistant United States Attorney ===
- First female: Sarah Evans Barker (1969) in 1972

=== Bar Association ===
- First female president (Indiana State Bar Association): Jeanne S. Miller in 1988
- First female president (Indianapolis Bar Association): Mary Y. Marsh in 1988
- First African American female president (Indianapolis Bar Association): Cynthia J. Ayers in 2006

== Firsts in local history ==
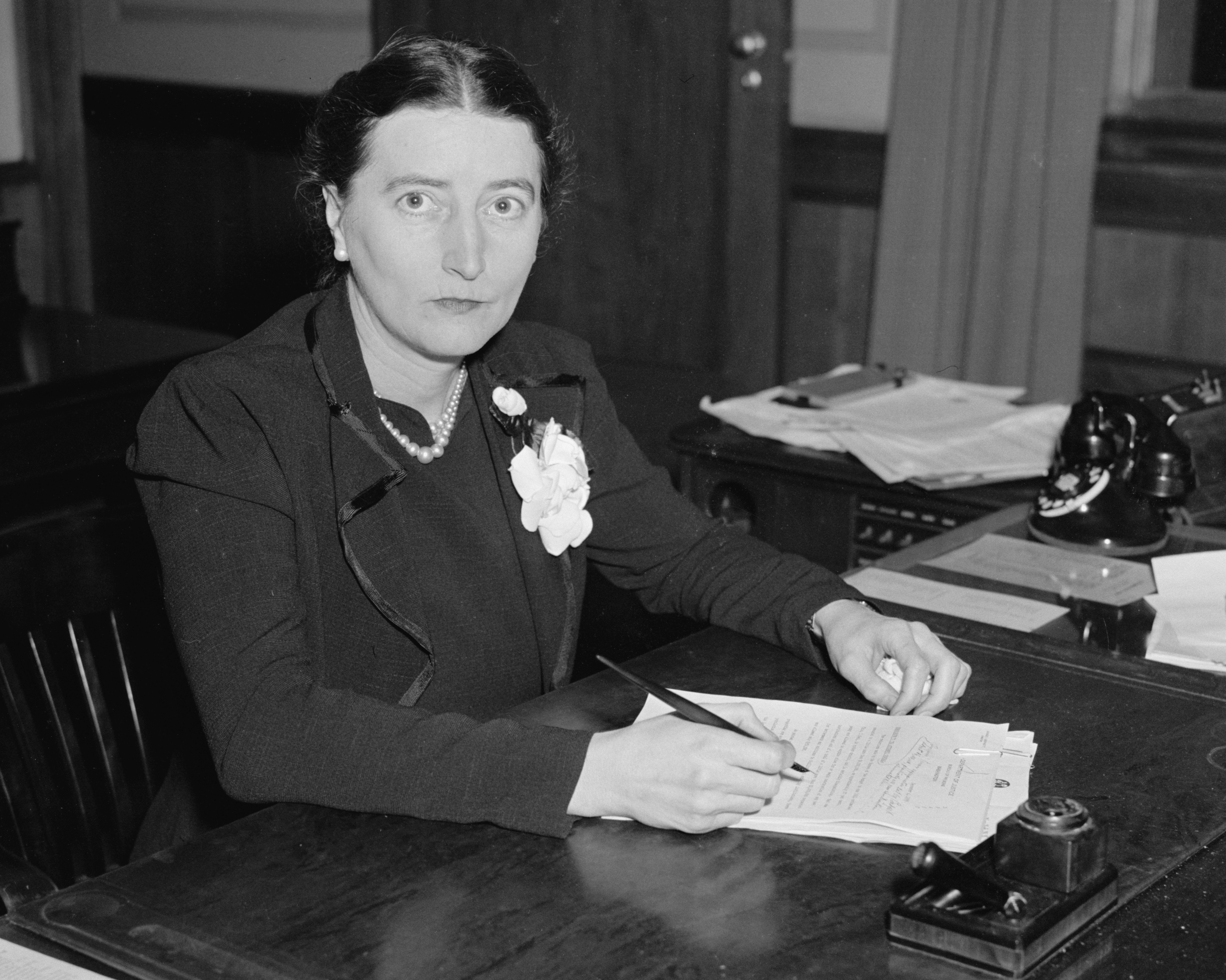
Helen Hironimus was appointed by the U. S. Attorney General to be Supt. of new Federal Reformatory for Women at Alderson, West Virginia, here on December 14, 1939.

- Carina Warrington (1915): First female lawyer in Allen County, Indiana
- Karen E. Richards: First female to serve as the Prosecutor for Allen County, Indiana
- Lisa Swaim: First female judge in Cass County, Indiana (2019)
- Clementine Barthold (1980): First female judge in Clark County, Indiana
- Judith Dwyer (1963): First female judge in Daviess County, Indiana (1987)
- Derexa Savage King (1951): First female lawyer in Dubois County, Indiana
- Beth Ann Butsch: First female lawyer and judge (2010) in Fayette County, Indiana
- Susan Orth: First female judge in Floyd County, Indiana (2004)
- Edith Eulalia Hendren (1921): First female lawyer in Greene County, Indiana
- Dena Benham Martin: First female judge in Greene County, Indiana
- AmyMarie Travis: First female appointed as a Judge of the Superior Court of Jackson County (2018)
- Cynthia S. Emkes (1985): First female judge in Johnson County, Indiana (1987)
- Diane Kavadias Schneider: First female magistrate in Lake County, Indiana (1993)
- Rehana Adat-Lopez: First Asian American (female) judge in Lake County, Indiana (2022)
- Susan Hemminger: First female judge in LaPorte County, Indiana
- Kimberly Kiner: First African American female judge in LaPorte County, Indiana
- Linda Lucille Chezem: First female to serve as a Judge of the Lawrence County Court, Indiana (1975)
- Hentietta Trisch Willkie (1897): First woman admitted to the bar in Madison County.
- Angela Warner Sims: First female circuit judge for Madison County, Indiana (2012)
- Caroline B. Hendricks (1895): First female lawyer in Marion County, Indiana
- Ella Groninger: First female judge in Marion County, Indiana (1919)
- Z. Mae Jimison: First African American female appointed as a Judge of the Superior Court in Marion County, Indiana (1988)
- Cynthia J. Ayers: First African American female elected as a Judge of the Superior Court in Marion County, Indiana (1991)
- Heather A. Welch: First (female) commercial court judge in Marion County, Indiana (2016)
- Karen E. Bravo: First African American (female) to serve as the Dean of Indiana University Robert H. McKinney School of Law (2020)
- Janette Surrisi: First female judge in Marshall County, Indiana (2024)
- Helen Hironimus: First female lawyer in Mount Vernon, Posey County, Indiana
- Frances Tilton Weaver (1925): First female lawyer in Porter County, Indiana
- Shelli Wright Johnson (1979): First female lawyer in Portage, Indiana [Porter County, Indiana]
- Mary Harper: First female to serve as the Deputy Prosecutor and Chief Deputy Prosecutor (1975–1981), a Superior Court Judge (1984), and a Judge of the Circuit Court (1996) in Porter County, Indiana
- Lisa M. Traylor-Wolff (1986): First female lawyer in Pulaski County, Indiana
- Maxine E. Ryer Miller (1922): First female lawyer in St. Joseph County, Indiana
- Elizabeth Fletcher Allen (1938): First African American female lawyer in St. Joseph County, Indiana
- Stephanie Steele: First African American female to serve as President of the St. Joseph County Bar Association (2019)
- Graciela Olivarez: First (Latino American) female to graduate from Notre Dame Law School (1970) [St. Joseph County, Indiana]
- Helen M. Gougar (1895): First female lawyer in Tippecanoe County, Indiana
- Tamar Althouse Scholz (1893): First woman to practice law in Evansville, Vanderburgh County, Indiana. She was also the first woman to graduate (1892) from the Indiana University's Department of Law.
- Sue Ann Hartig: First female judicial officer in Vanderburgh County, Indiana
- Mary Margaret “Maggie” Lloyd: First elected female judge in Vanderburgh County, Indiana (2000)
- Elizabeth "Bessie" Jane Eaglesfield (1875): First woman in Indiana admitted to the bar, Vigo County Circuit Court, September 8. 1875.
- Barbara Brugnaux: First female judge in Vigo County, Indiana
- Amy Catherine Cornell: First female appointed as a Judge of the Wabash County Superior Court, Indiana (2017)

== See also ==
- List of first women lawyers and judges in the United States
- Timeline of women lawyers in the United States
- Women in law

== Other topics of interest ==
- List of first minority male lawyers and judges in the United States
- List of first minority male lawyers and judges in Indiana
