= Journal of Legislation =

- Discipline: Legal studies
- Language: English
- Edited by: Hubert Ning

Publication details
- Former names: New Dimensions in Legislation, N.D. Journal of Legislation
- History: 1971-present
- Publisher: Notre Dame Law School
- Frequency: Semiannual

Standard abbreviations
- Bluebook: J. Legis.
- ISO 4: J. Legis.

Indexing
- ISSN: 0146-9584
- LCCN: 78648410
- OCLC no.: 818988515

Links
- Journal homepage

The Journal of Legislation is a scholarly legal journal published by Notre Dame Law School.

== History ==
The Journal of Legislation is a legislative law review which focuses on analysis and reform of legislation and public policy. It was founded in 1971 as New Dimensions in Legislation, before being renamed as N.D. Journal of Legislation in 1974 and finally just Journal of Legislation in 1976. The journal is advised by faculty advisors William Kelley and Lloyd Hitoshi Mayer.

The journal typically publishes two issues every year, with each issue usually comprising two to three articles from independent contributors on legislation or policy, and three to four staff-written notes. Occasionally, it also publishes briefer commentaries on legislative articles that have appeared in previous or concurrent issues. The journal is financially self-sufficient, independently organized and completely student run.

== Notable contributors ==
- Associate Justice of the United States Supreme Court William O. Douglas, . Journal of Legislation. 4 (1): 7. 1977.
- United States Secretary of Defense Leon Panetta, "Challenges of Leadership in the Twenty-First Century". Journal of Legislation. 47 (2): 1. 2021.
- Vice President of the United States Walter Mondale, . Journal of Legislation. 10 (1): 1. 1983.
- United States Secretary of State Edmund Muskie, . Journal of Legislation. 4 (1): 11. 1977.
- United States Attorney General Elliott Richardson, . Journal of Legislation. 8 (2): 199. 1981.
- Director of the Federal Bureau of Investigation William H. Webster, . Journal of Legislation. 7 (1): 7. 1980.
- U.S. Sen. Barry M. Goldwater, "Can A Free Press Survive its Postal Nightmare?". Journal of Legislation. 3 (1): 5. 1976.
- U.S. Sen. Christopher Dodd, "A Proposal for Making Product Liability Fair, Efficient and Predictable". Journal of Legislation. 14 (2): 133. 1987.
- U.S. Rep. Richard A. Gephardt, "Tax Reform and Capital Gains: The War Against Unfair Taxes is Far From Over". Journal of Legislation. 14 (1): 1. 1987.
- U.S. Rep. Jack Kemp, "Early Phased Deployment of SDI as a National Insurance Policy". Journal of Legislation. 15 (2): 81. 1989.
- Gov. Michael S. Dukakis, "The Problem is Not the Phone Calls; It's the Special Interest Money". Journal of Legislation. 24 (2): 201. 1998.
- U.S. Rep. Bob Barr, "A Tyrant's Toolbox: Technology and Privacy in America". Journal of Legislation. 26 (1): 71. 2000.
- U.S. Sen. Rick Santorum, "A Compassionate Conservative Agenda: Addressing Poverty for the Next Millennium". Journal of Legislation. 26 (1): 93. 2000.
- U.S. Rep. Peter T. King, "Remembering the Lessons of 9/11: Preserving Tools and Authorities in the Fight Against Terrorism". Journal of Legislation. 41 (2): 173. 2015.
