= Notre Dame Law School =

Catholic law school in Notre Dame, Indiana, US

- Motto: Latin: Vita, Dulcedo, Spes, lit. 'Our Life, our Sweetness, our Hope'
- Parent school: University of Notre Dame
- Religious affiliation: Roman Catholic (Congregation of Holy Cross)
- Established: 1869; 157 years ago
- School type: Private law school
- Parent endowment: $18.9 billion
- Dean: G. Marcus Cole
- Location: Notre Dame, Indiana, U.S. 41°41′55.27″N 86°14′16.45″W
- Enrollment: 529 (2022)
- Faculty: 135 (2022)
- USNWR ranking: 20th (tie) (2026)
- Bar pass rate: 90.16% (2019)
- Website: law.nd.edu
- ABA profile: Standard 509 Report

Notre Dame Law School is the law school of the University of Notre Dame in Notre Dame, Indiana. Established in 1869, it is the oldest continuously operating Catholic law school in the United States.

The school enrolls approximately 600 JD students. In addition to the JD degree, the school also offers several dual degree programs, including a JD–MBA, JD/MS, JD/MA, and JD/MEng. It also offers the only American Bar Association–approved year-long study-abroad program, which is based in London.

== History ==
=== Beginnings ===
Notre Dame Law School opened in February 1869. It was the second Catholic law school opened in the United States, and the oldest in continuous operation. The first was the Saint Louis University School of Law, which opened in 1843 but closed soon after in 1847 (it was then re-opened in 1908). From the start, the Law School required law students to have completed previous education in a thorough course in the liberal arts. This was uncommon at the time when Law School applicants only had to be 18. The first “principal” of the law department and Professor of Law was Matthew F. Colovin. Other law faculty in the early years included Lucius Tong and Timothy Howard. The first class graduated in 1871 and consisted of three students.

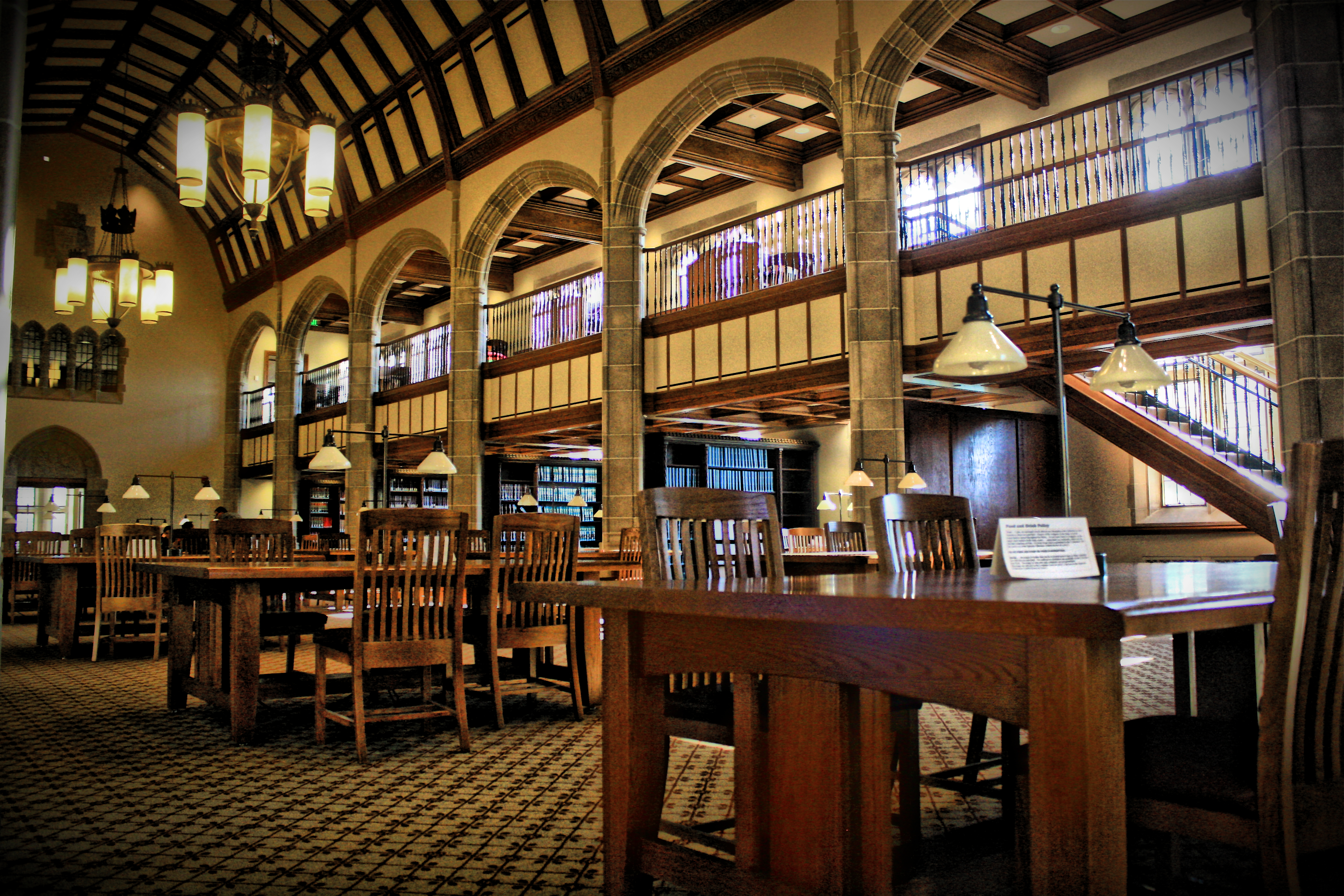
The reading room of the Kresge Law Library, in Biolchini Hall

=== "Colonel" Hoynes era ===
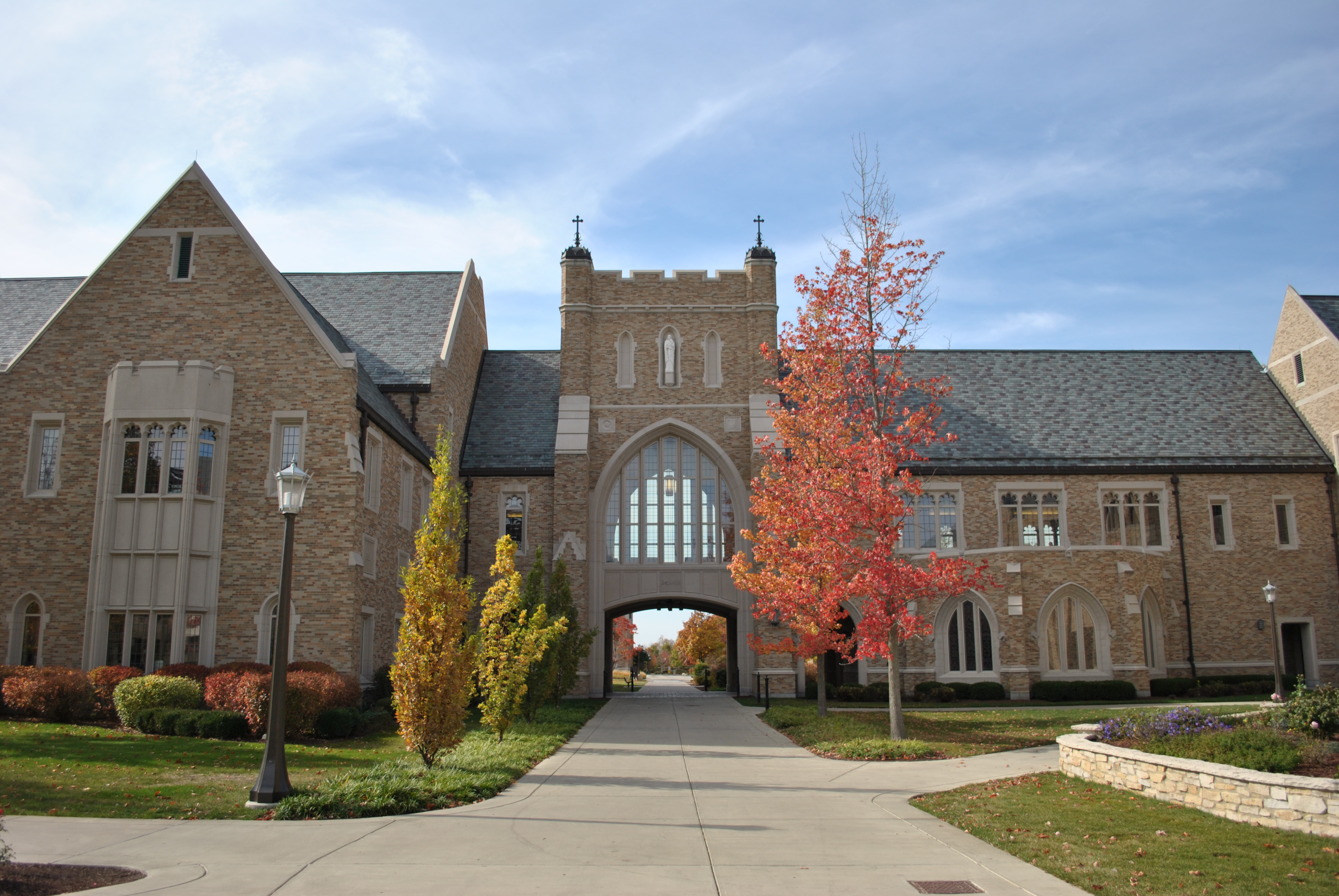
The Arch connecting Eck (left) and Biolchini (right) Halls

In 1882, Rev. Walsh, then the president of the university, invited William J. Hoynes to take control of the Law School, which was in demise. Hoynes accepted Rev. Walsh's offer in 1883 and expanded the program from two to three years. and introduced a Moot Court for practical training. Under his tenure, enrollment in the law school grew.

Originally, law classes were held in the Main Building and Sorin Hall. As the program grew, the university repurposed and renovated the former Institute of Technology building as Hoynes Hall in 1916. This became the Law School's home until its eventual relocation. The building later served the Architecture Department, the Psychology Department, and, since 1976, the Music Department as Crowley Hall.

In 1921 Maxine Evelyn Ryer became the first woman to study law at Notre Dame and the first woman to practice law in St. Joseph County, Indiana. In 1925 John Whitman was appointed by Dean Thomas Konop as the first Law School librarian, and the collection grew to 7,000 volumes in 1944, as part of a campus beautification projects, statues by Eugene Kormendi were added to Hoynes Hall.

=== 20th century ===
Dean Thomas F. Konop, c. 1936

On October 7, 1930, the Law School was transferred to the new building located on Notre Dame Avenue. The Gothic building, which still stands today, has a large reading room. The second librarian, Lora Lashbrook, and the third, Marie Lawrence, grew the library's collection to 20,000 volumes by 1952, and 55,000 volumes by 1960. The increase of both the library collection and student population reduced the available space. Regardless, this was balanced by the expansion of the law school funded by a donation from S. S. Kresge, the namesake of the Kresge Law Library. Under the guidance of Dean Lawless the school started one of the nation's first programs allowing law students to study abroad, with a year-long program in London to study the roots of common law. In 1986 a further expansion added the East Reading Room and created the reference librarian offices. In 1990 alumnus John F. Sandner donated funding for the acquisition of the entire 120,000 volume collection of the Chicago Bar Association Library. In 1970, Graciela Olivarez became the first woman and Latina to graduate from Notre Dame Law School. The next class to graduate women would be 1973.

=== 21st-century ===
==== New resources for scholarship ====
In 2004, the Kresge Law Library became one of the few academic law libraries to own more than 600,000 volumes. This was accomplished mainly under the tenure of the fifth law librarian, Roger Jacobs, who also served as head librarian of the Library of the United States Supreme Court. Between 2007 and 2008, a new building, the Eck Hall of Law, was constructed to provide the Law School with an additional 85,000 square feet of classroom and office space. In 2010 Robert Biolchini, alumnus and entrepreneur from Tulsa, Oklahoma, funded the renovation of the Kresge Law Library, located in the renamed Biolchini Hall of Law. The renovated Biolchini Hall is 106,500 square feet, has two 50-seat classrooms, a seminar room, 29 group study rooms, and holds 300,000 book volumes and more than 300,000 volumes in microfilm. The total cost of renovations and expansions was approximately 58 million dollars.

==== Faculty hiring momentum ====
In recent years, the expanding Notre Dame Law faculty has attracted several accomplished scholars from other top law schools. In 2009, University of Virginia Law School Professor Stephen Smith left a tenured position to join the Notre Dame Law faculty. In 2012, Professor Barry Cushman, the James Monroe Distinguished Professor of Law and Professor of History at the University of Virginia, joined the ND Law faculty. In 2017, it was announced that private law theorist Paul Miller from McGill University would join the Notre Dame faculty. Samuel Bray, a remedies theorist previously teaching at UCLA law, joined the faculty in 2018. During the same period, long-time Notre Dame professors have been invited for visiting faculty positions at Harvard, the University of Michigan and the University of Chicago law schools.

==== Expanded urban presence in DC and Chicago ====
In 2013, new space was secured for the Notre Dame Law in Chicago program, which allows ND Law students to pursue their studies from an urban campus in downtown Chicago ("in the Loop"). In 2015, in partnership with Kirkland & Ellis, the law school debuted its Notre Dame Law in DC program, which allows students to spend a semester studying in Washington, DC.

In recent years, the school has hosted talks and events by many prominent legal figures, including Ruth Bader Ginsburg, Antonin Scalia, Clarence Thomas, Samuel Alito, Sonia Sotomayor, William Barr, Brett Kavanaugh, and Amy Coney Barrett.

=== Deans ===
- 1883–1919: William J. Hoynes
- 1918–1923: Francis J. Vurpillat
- 1923–1941: Thomas F. Konop
- 1941–1952: Clarence Manion
- 1952–1968: Joseph O'Meara
- 1968–1971: William B. Lawless Jr.
- 1971–1975: Thomas L. Shaffer
- 1975–1999: David T. Link
- 1999–2009: Patricia A. O'Hara
- 2009–2019: Nell Jessup Newton
- 2019–Present: G. Marcus Cole

== Admissions and rankings ==
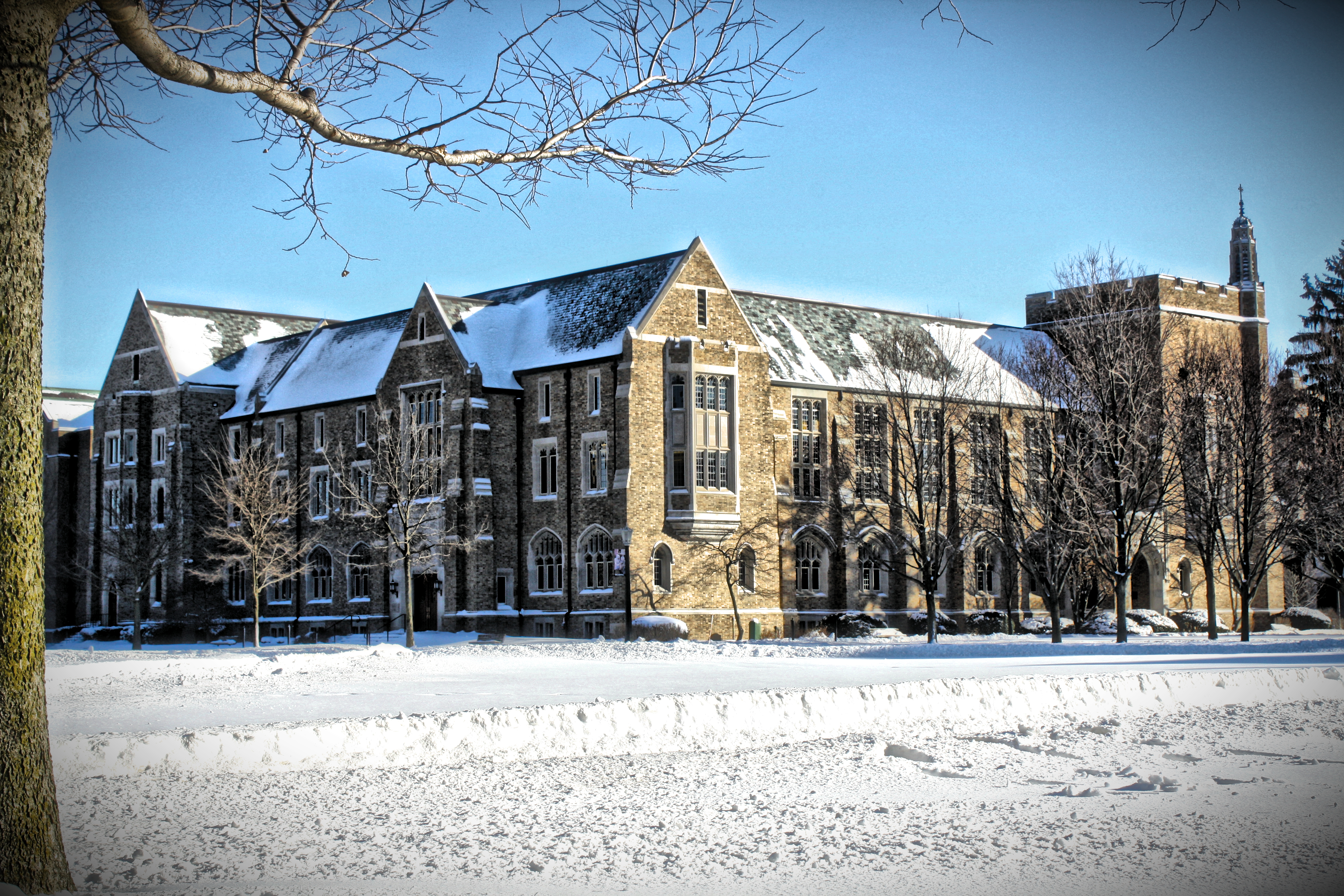
Biolchini Hall in winter

Admission to Notre Dame Law School is highly selective. For the class entering in the fall of 2023, the median LSAT score was 169 and the median undergraduate GPA was 3.83.

In 2026, Notre Dame Law School was ranked 20th among the nation's 197 ABA accredited schools by U.S. News & World Report. and 10th by Above The Law in their annual Top 50 Law School Rankings for 2023.

== Degrees ==
The law school grants the professional Juris Doctor, Master of Laws and Doctor of Juridical Science degrees. The Master of Laws program can be pursued either at the main campus in South Bend or at the Law School's London Law Centre in the United Kingdom. The law school also offers a Master of Science in Patent Law, Certificate in Patent Prosecution, and LL.M. in International Human Rights Law.

== Job and clerkship placement ==
For the class of 2022, 191 out of 210 graduates (90%) secured full-time, long-term employment requiring passage of the bar exam within ten months of graduation. The top 3 most popular destinations for graduates in the class of 2018 were Illinois (18.1%), New York (13.3%), and California (7.1%). Furthermore, 38.6% of graduates in the class of 2022 found employment at national law firms and 15.2% pursued federal clerkships.

== Costs ==
The total cost of attendance (indicating the cost of tuition, fees, and living expenses) at Notre Dame Law School for the 2024–2025 academic year is $97,116.

== Facilities ==
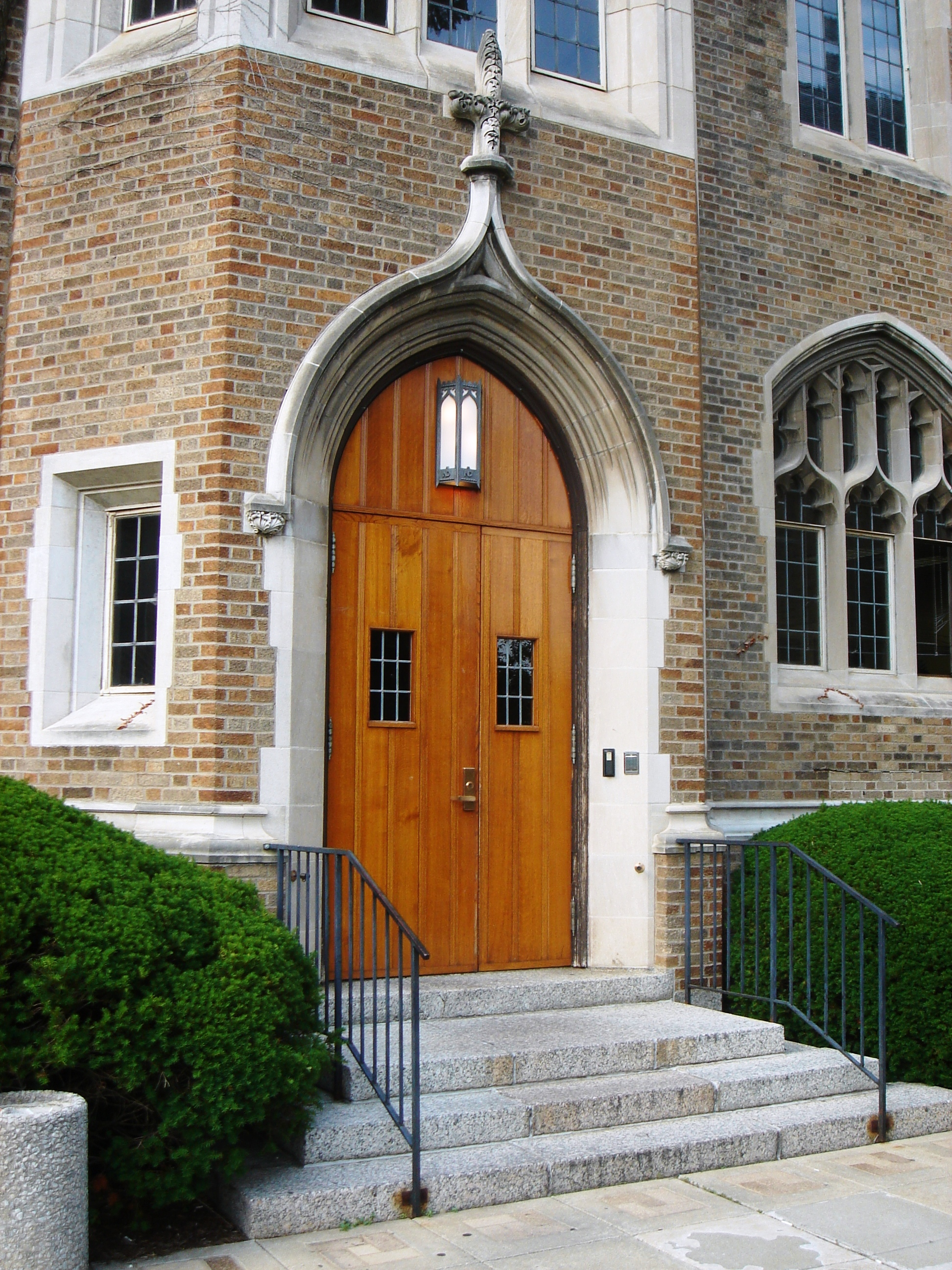
Former main entrance to Notre Dame Law School; the new Eck Hall of Law opened in 2009.

Notre Dame Law School is located on the Notre Dame Campus and is housed in the Eck and Biochini Halls, two buildings connected by a suspended walkway.

Biolchini Hall was designed by architect Charles Donagh Maginnis in 1930 and serves as a prominent example of collegiate Gothic architecture. It was renovated in 2010 due to a gift from Robert Biolchini and renamed to its current name. The Kresge Law Library is located in Biochini Hall, while most of the classrooms are in Eck Hall. Funding for the law library was provided by businessman S.S. Kresge, the founder of what is now Sears Holding. In 2004, the Kresge Law Library became one of the few academic law libraries to own more than 600,000 volumes. This was accomplished mainly under the tenure of the fifth law librarian, Roger Jacobs, who also served as head librarian of the U.S. Supreme Court Library.

Eck Hall was built in 2010. The $57-million, 85,000-square-foot building was connected to the original building through a suspended walkway that constitutes a common area. Eck includes both classrooms and faculty and administrative offices, as well as space for student services and activities. In addition to a 205-seat moot courtroom, the Patrick F. McCartan Courtroom, there are four lecture halls, five seminar rooms, and three skills training rooms available for classes and events. The construction of Eck and the connecting walkway to Biolchini also allowed for the creation of a new chapel dedicated to St. Thomas More. The building was named in honor of school graduate, benefactor, and advisor Frank E. Eck.

The Law School also hosts a legal aid clinic in South Bend.

== Notable alumni ==
Notre Dame's alumni roster includes a range of distinguished jurists, advocates, politicians, and business leaders.

- Tae-Ung Baik – a legal scholar of international human rights law and Korean law; Professor of Law at the University of Hawaii at Manoa William S. Richardson School of Law; former Prisoner of Conscience
- Amy Coney Barrett – associate justice of the United States Supreme Court
- William Beauchamp – former president of the University of Portland
- G. Robert Blakey – author of the Racketeer Influenced and Corrupt Organizations Act
- Joseph Cari Jr. – private equity investor, policy analyst, and philanthropist
- Tom Clements – quarterback coach for the Green Bay Packers
- N. Patrick Crooks – Justice of the Wisconsin Supreme Court
- John Crowley – biotechnology executive and inspiration for the film Extraordinary Measures
- Lucille Davy – Commissioner of the New Jersey Department of Education.
- Samuel L. Devine – former United States congressman (R-OH)
- John V. Diener – Mayor of Green Bay, Wisconsin
- Andy Dillon – former speaker of the Michigan House of Representatives, gubernatorial candidate, and former Michigan State Treasurer
- Larry Dolan – owner and President of the Cleveland Indians
- Joe Donnelly – former United States senator (D-IN)
- Clark Durant – CEO and founder of Cornerstone Schools (Michigan); political activist
- David Campos Guaderrama – United States district judge for the United States District Court for the Western District of Texas
- Patricia Anne Gaughan – United States district judge for the United States District Court for the Northern District of Ohio
- John M. Gearin – former United States senator (D-OR)
- Mark Gimenez – author of legal thrillers (his book The Color of the Law was a New York Times bestseller)
- William J. Granfield – former United States congressman (D-MA)
- Robert A. Grant – former United States congressman (R-IN) and Chief Judge for the United States District Court for the Northern District of Indiana
- Michael Fansler – justice of the Indiana Supreme Court
- José Reyes Ferriz – Mexican politician, affiliated to the Institutional Revolutionary Party (PRI), former Municipal President (mayor) of Ciudad Juárez
- Nora Barry Fischer – United States district judge for the United States District Court for the Western District of Pennsylvania
- Peter F. Flaherty – former mayor of Pittsburgh and United States Deputy Attorney General in the Carter administration
- Kevin Hasson – founder and President of The Becket Fund for Religious Liberty
- Donna Jean Hrinak – American diplomat, former U.S. Ambassador to Brazil (2002–2004), Venezuela (2000–2002), Bolivia (1997–2000), and the Dominican Republic (1994–1997).
- Harry Kelly – 39th Governor of Michigan from 1943 to 1947
- John Kilkenny – former judge on the United States Court of Appeals for the Ninth Circuit
- Peter King – former United States Congressman (R-NY)
- David G. Larimer – a federal judge on the United States District Court for the Western District of New York
- Edward Leavy – Judge of the United States Court of Appeals for the Ninth Circuit and the United States Foreign Intelligence Surveillance Court of Review
- Paul M. Lewis – American diplomat (appointed by President Barack Obama to serve as United States Department of Defense's Special Envoy for Guantanamo Closure)
- Brendan Loy – a blogger who gained fame for his coverage of Hurricane Katrina
- Maureen Mahoney – former deputy solicitor general and well-known appellate lawyer, reported to have been among George W. Bush's Supreme Court candidates
- Eduardo Malapit – Hawaiian politician, Mayor of Kauai (1974–1982), first Filipino American mayor of any United States municipality
- John E. Martin – former chief justice of the Wisconsin Supreme Court
- Greg Marx – NFL player
- Romano L. Mazzoli – former United States congressman (D-KY) and immigration reform advocate
- Judith A. McMorrow – torts scholar and law professor at Boston College Law School
- Carol Ann Mooney – president of Saint Mary's College
- Brian Moynihan – president and CEO of Bank of America Corporation
- Joseph P. O'Hara – former United States congressman (R-MN)
- Graciela Olivarez – the first female and Latina graduate; Director of the Community Services Administration under Jimmy Carter
- Clifford Patrick O'Sullivan – former judge United States Court of Appeals for the Sixth Circuit
- Andrew Napolitano, Fox News senior judicial analyst and former judge
- Paul V. Niemeyer – Judge on the United States Court of Appeals for the Fourth Circuit
- Jerry Pappert – United States district judge of the United States District Court for the Eastern District of Pennsylvania and former Pennsylvania attorney general
- Renee Rabinowitz – psychologist and lawyer
- Keith James Rothfus – former United States congressman (R-PA)
- Margaret A. Ryan – judge on the United States Court of Appeals for the Armed Forces
- Yara Sallam – Egyptian feminist and human rights activist
- Janis Lynn Sammartino – United States district judge for the United States District Court for the Southern District of California
- John F. Sandner – former chairman of the Chicago Mercantile Exchange
- Lisa M. Schenck – military law scholar and judge of United States Court of Military Commission Review
- Thomas D. Schroeder – United States district judge for the United States District Court for the Middle District of North Carolina
- Thomas L. Shaffer – professor of legal ethics at Washington & Lee University and the University of Notre Dame
- Theresa Lazar Springmann – United States district judge for the United States District Court for the Northern District of Indiana
- Michael A. Stepovich – former governor of Alaska
- Luther Merritt Swygert – former judge on the United States Court of Appeals for the Seventh Circuit
- Martha Vázquez – United States district judge on the United States District Court for the District of New Mexico
- Pete Visclosky – United States Congressman (D-IN)
- Frank Comerford Walker – former United States Postmaster General and chairman of the Democratic National Committee
- Kevin Warren – Big Ten commissioner, former CEO of the Minnesota Vikings and the highest-ranking African-American executive working on the business side for an NFL team
- Ann Claire Williams – former judge on the United States Court of Appeals for the Seventh Circuit
- Charles R. Wilson – judge on the United States Court of Appeals for the Eleventh Circuit
- Mary Wittenberg – president and CEO of New York Road Runners (NYRR)
- Francis Parker Yockey – American attorney and far-right political philosopher
- Mary Yu – justice of the Washington Supreme Court
- William J. Zloch – United States district judge for United States District Court for the Southern District of Florida
- Chris Zorich – former Notre Dame and Chicago Bears star Defensive lineman
- Kip A. Petroff - Texas trial lawyer and founding partner of Petroff & Associates

== Notable faculty ==
Notable current faculty include:

- John Robert Blakey – former federal prosecutor and current district judge on the United States District Court for the Northern District of Illinois
- John Finnis – Australian philosopher, specializing in the philosophy of law (also Professor of Law at University College, Oxford)
- Nicole Stelle Garnett – legal scholar specializing in the areas of real estate, land use, urban development, local government law, and education
- Richard W. Garnett – First Amendment and criminal law scholar
- Jimmy Gurulé – former under secretary for enforcement, United States Department of the Treasury and former assistant attorney general for the United States Department of Justice
- William K. Kelley – former White House deputy counsel
- Mary Ellen O'Connell – international law scholar
- Kenneth Francis Ripple – senior circuit judge on the United States Court of Appeals for the Seventh Circuit
- Thomas Paprocki – American prelate of the Roman Catholic Church who serves as bishop of the Diocese of Springfield, Illinois

Notable former faculty include:

- Amy Coney Barrett – associate justice of the United States Supreme Court
- G. Robert Blakey – author of the Racketeer Influenced and Corrupt Organizations Act (RICO) (also an alumnus)
- Anton-Hermann Chroust – German-American legal historian
- John H. Garvey – a professor at the University of Michigan Law School and Dean of the Boston College Law School
- Dan Flanagan – Justice of the Indiana Supreme Court
- M. Cathleen Kaveny – a scholar of law and theology at Boston College
- Douglas Kmiec – U.S. Ambassador (ret.), confirmed 2009; assistant attorney general of the United States, confirmed 1988, White House fellow and special assistant to the secretary United States Department of Housing & Urban Development; dean and St. Thomas More Professor of Law, Catholic University of America
- Thomas F. Konop – former U.S. representative from Wisconsin
- Juan E. Méndez – human rights advocate known for work on behalf of political prisoners
- Carol Ann Mooney – president of Saint Mary's College in Notre Dame, Indiana
- John T. Noonan Jr. – senior United States federal judge on the United States Court of Appeals for the Ninth Circuit
- Charles E. Rice – legal scholar specializing in Natural Law Theory
- Thomas L. Shaffer – property law scholar
- Patrick J. Schiltz – United States district judge of the United States District Court for the District of Minnesota
- Larry Soderquist – securities law scholar
- Harris Wofford – former U.S. senator from Pennsylvania and civil rights activist
- Dudley G. Wooten – former U.S. representative from Texas.

== Law journals ==
Notre Dame Law School publishes five student-run journals:

- Notre Dame Law Review
- Journal of Legislation
- Notre Dame Journal of Law, Ethics & Public Policy
- Notre Dame Journal of International and Comparative Law
- Notre Dame Journal on Emerging Technologies
