= Elizabeth Hurley (judge) =

American judge in Indiana)

Liz Hurley

Chief Judge, Superior Court St. Joseph County, Indiana
- Incumbent
- Assumed office April 2013
- Preceded by: Roland Chamblee

Office
- Appointed by: Mike Pence

Personal details
- Spouse: Charles T. Hurley
- Education: Villanova University (BA); Notre Dame Law School (JD)

The Honorable Elizabeth 'Liz' C. Hurley is a criminal division superior court judge in St. Joseph County, Indiana.

== Biography ==
Hurley graduated undergraduate from Villanova University in 1992 with a Bachelor of Arts in English. She earned her Juris Doctor from Notre Dame Law School in 1995. Hurley was admitted to the practice of law in Indiana in 1995.

Hurley worked both as a prosecutor and in private practice, prior to appointment.

Hurley was appointed by Indiana Governor Mike Pence to the bench in March 2013.

Judge Hurley has taught classes at the Notre Dame Law School.
