= Richard Garnett =

Richard Garnett may refer to:

- Richard Garnett (philologist) (1789–1850), British philologist, author and librarian
- Richard Garnett (writer) (1835–1906), British biographer and poet
- Richard Garnett (1923–2013), an author who was the son of publisher David Garnett
- Richard B. Garnett (1817–1863), American general
- Richard W. Garnett (born 1968), American legal scholar
