= Craig J. Bobay =

American judge

Judge, Allen Superior Court, Allen County, Indiana (appointed in 2013 and then elected in 2014 and 2020)
- Incumbent
- Assumed office 2013
- Appointed by: Governor Mike Pence
- Preceded by: Stephen M. Sims

Personal details
- Education: Indiana University Fort Wayne (B.A.); Indiana University Maurer School of Law (J.D., cum laude, 1991)

Craig J. Bobay is an American judge who has served in Indiana's state courts in Allen County. He has served on the Superior Court since 2013, and held various leadership positions on that court. He also played a key part in establishing and developing Indiana's Commercial Courts, both as a leader in studying and planning for these courts creation and operation in numerous Indiana counties, and in serving as a specialist business court judge himself in Allen's Commercial Court. Before going to law school, he worked for Indiana's Superior Court as an administrator, and was a juvenile probation office. After law school, he served as a federal judicial clerk before entering the practice of law.

== Judicial service ==
In 2013, after a merit-based selection and screening process, Indiana Governor Mike Pence appointed Bobay to Allen County's Superior Court's civil division, filling the vacancy left by Judge Daniel G. Heath when he changed divisions to replace retiring Judge Stephen M. Sims. Bobay was subsequently elected and reelected in 2014 and 2020. The Allen Superior Court is a trial court of general jurisdiction with civil, criminal, and family relations divisions.

Bobay was elected by the Allen Superior Court’s judges as Chief Judge for the 2016 to 2017 term. He later served as Administrative Judge of the civil division. Among other things as administrative judge, he has been involved with the newly created office of the "Protection Order Specialist," who is to provide technical assistance to those seeking judicial relief and protection from domestic or family abuse, sexual offenses, or stalking.

From 2003 to 2013, Bobay had been a Magistrate in the Allen County Circuit Court, and from 1997 to 2002 he had been a Magistrate in the Allen Superior Court. The circuit court's jurisdiction is expressly limited to felonies involving driving while intoxicated, traffic violations, nonsupport of children, as well as some civil cases, domestic relations cases, paternity and child support cases, mortgage foreclosures, and it includes problem solving courts such as the Veteran's Court. Magistrates in the Superior and Circuit Courts have certain judicial powers, for example in probate, guardianship, and trust matters and matters concerning children in need of services.

As a judge, Bobay has served on the Board of Governors of the Judicial Conference of Indiana. He has served on the Conference's Civil Jury Instructions Committee, Judicial Administration Committee, Problem Solving Courts Committee, Domestic Relations Committee, Jury Rules Committee, and Magistrate Committee. Bobay chaired the committee that rewrote the Appointed Judicial Officers Deskbook for Indiana Judges and Magistrates. He has served as a member of the Indiana Judges Association Board of Managers, the Allen County Bar Association Board of Directors, and Volunteer Lawyers Program of Northeast Indiana Board of Directors.

=== Role in creating Commercial Courts in Indiana ===
In 2013, Indiana's Supreme Court initiated an effort to evaluate the idea of creating specialized commercial courts in the state. A business courts subcommittee was assigned this task. Bobay was one of the three people on that subcommittee (which also included Marion County Superior Court judge Heather A. Welch). After researching the concept, in 2014, Bobay and Welch formed a broader, informal, Commercial Courts Working Group (the working group) to advise the subcommittee. The working group and subcommittee ultimately urged creating a commercial court pilot project. In 2015, the Indiana Supreme Court formalized the working group. In 2016, Indiana's Supreme Court followed the committee's and working group's recommendations to create a pilot Commercial Court. Bobay was a chair of the working group.

In 2016, Bobay was one of the six original pilot Commercial Court judges. The working group tracked and studied the pilot program for three years, and after its reports and recommendations over that time, the Supreme Court made the Commercial Courts permanent in 2019. Bobay was again one of six Indiana judges assigned to the Commercial Court in 2019, and has continued as a Commercial Court judge to the present (as of August 2024). The working group's role ended in 2019, but the Indiana Supreme Court immediately created a Commercial Court Committee as an adjunct to the permanent Commercial Courts. Bobay has served as co-chair, with Welch, on this permanent committee.

Bobay has also served as chair of the Commercial Court Handbook and Treatise Subcommittee of the Commercial Courts Committee, which created a written legal treatise in 2022 as a guide to attorneys practicing in the Commercial Courts, covering areas of Indiana law that arise in the Commercial Courts.

== Legal practice and prior work ==
Bobay was in private practice for five years as a litigator before joining the judicial branch in 1997.

Before going to law school, Bobay worked as an administrator in the Superior Court in the 1980s, and as a juvenile probation officer.

== Judicial clerk ==
Bobay served as a judicial law clerk to Judge William Charles Lee of the United States District Court for the Northern District of Indiana.

== Education ==
Bobay received his Bachelor of Arts degree from Indiana University, Fort Wayne (then known as Indiana University - Purdue University Ft. Wayne) and his Juris Doctor degree, cum laude, from the Indiana University Maurer School of Law in 1991.

For ten years, Bobay taught in the Department of Public Policy at Purdue University Fort Wayne, and was twice named the outstanding Public Policy part time faculty member.

== Positions, memberships, and honors ==
Bobay has held the following positions, memberships, and honors, among others;

- Chair, Commercial Courts Working Group (2016–2019)
- Chair, Commercial Courts Committee (2019 to present)
- Chair, Commercial Court Handbook and Treatise Subcommittee of the Commercial Court Committee
- Chief Judge, Allen Superior Court (2016–2017)
- Administrative Judge, Allen Superior Court Civil Division
- Member, Board of Governors, Judicial Conference of Indiana
- Member, Judicial Conference of Indiana Committees: Civil Jury Instructions; Judicial Administration; Problem Solving Courts; Domestic Relations; Jury Rules; Magistrate
- Distinguished Barrister, honor given by The Indiana Lawyer (2016)
- Twice named outstanding Public Policy part time faculty member at Purdue University Fort Wayne
- Member, Indiana Judges Association Board of Managers
- Member, Allen County Bar Association Board of Directors
- Member, Board of Directors, Volunteer Lawyers Program of Northeast Indiana
- Board of Directors of the Friends of the Lincoln Collection
- President, St. Thomas More Society of Fort Wayne
- Member, Board of Directors of ACRES Land Trust
- Member of the Bishop Dwenger High School Hall of Fame, as an Alumnus of the Year
