= Helen Elsie Austin =

American diplomat

- Born: 10 May 1908; Tuskegee, Alabama, U.S.
- Died: October 26, 2004 (aged 96); San Antonio, Texas, U.S.
- Other name: H. Elsie Austin
- Occupations: Attorney; state official, Foreign Service Officer
- Known for: Pioneering black lawyer, civil rights and administrator/organizer
- Father: George J. Austin

Helen Elsie Austin (May 10, 1908– Oct 26, 2004), known as H. Elsie Austin as an adult, was an American attorney, civil rights leader, and diplomat from the Midwest. From 1960 to 1970, she served for ten years with the United States Information Agency (USIA) on various cultural projects in Africa. The first African-American woman to graduate from the University of Cincinnati School of Law, Austin was appointed in 1937 as an assistant attorney general in Ohio. She was the first Black and the first woman to hold this position.

Austin held legal positions in Washington, D.C. for several federal agencies during the New Deal. She also worked to advance civil rights for African Americans, serving on numerous committees, and in executive positions. She consulted for National Association for the Advancement of Colored People (NAACP), and the National Council of Negro Women. She also served as president for the Delta Sigma Theta sorority, "one of the largest African American women's organization in the world."

In 1934 Austin became a member of the Baháʼí Faith in Cincinnati. Ten years later she was elected on the National Spiritual Assembly in the United States, the institution in charge of the affairs in the country. She was a Bahá'i for the rest of her life. Decades later, while serving in Africa, she joined what was then the regional national assembly of North West Africa.

== Early life, family and education ==
Helen Elsie Austin was born in 1908 to Mary Louise Austin, née Dotson (sometimes spelled Dodson), and George J. Austin at the Tuskegee Institute in Tuskegee, Alabama; both parents taught and lived at the Institute. Her mother taught Household Science and her father was Commandant of Men; he was a veteran of the Spanish-American War.

Her parents married June 10, 1906. They encouraged their children to become educated and to work for advancement of their race. George's sister Jennie Charlotte Austin was among African-American students admitted to the College of Education at the University of Cincinnati in the early 20th century; she graduated in the class of 1911.

Austin's mother was the daughter of Mentor Dotson, an Alabama minister and teacher, and his wife. In 1872 Rev. Dotson was elected as a Republican member of the Alabama House of Representatives, during Reconstruction. Austin believed that her mother was highly regarded by Booker T. Washington and his wife because of Rev. Dotson's achievements.

Helen Elsie Austin is generally recorded as having been born at Tuskegee. She had a brother, George J. Austin Jr. The family was still at Tuskegee in 1910, according to the US Census,

By 1912, her father worked as Commandant of Men at the Prairie View Normal School in Austin, Texas, established for African-American students. This normal school, initially founded to train teachers for lower grades, developed over time as Prairie View A&M University. In 1914, her father wrote a letter to the editor of The New York Age, a prominent black newspaper in New York City. He took issue with a photograph showing African-American attendees at a fancy ball, noting that all the men were with women of lighter skin. He argued that it was an example of colorism in the black community, which favored light-skinned women. Further, he wrote that concubinage of black women in the South (and elsewhere) was still a problem.

Before the US entered Great War started, George Austin sought to join officer training at a camp in New York. He was not accepted because of the policy of the US War Department, He entered Fort Des Moines Provisional Army Officer Training School, newly created to train African-American officers to lead troops in the US Army, as a first lieutenant; the training ran from June to October, 1917. Like other men of a range of ages, he registered for the draft. He was later credited with serving with the 65th Machine Gun Company (which might be the UK unit of the same name).

After the war, the family settled in Cincinnati, Ohio, by January 1920. Her father was secretary of director of a civic league supported by the black community in Port Huron, Michigan, located on Lake Huron of the Great Lakes. He moved to Ohio to become director of the nearby Zanesville Civic League, which served black students in the city of the same name. It was financially supported by black and white citizens. Her mother Mary Louise Austin worked at Stowe School in Cincinnati, named after Harriet Beecher Stowe.

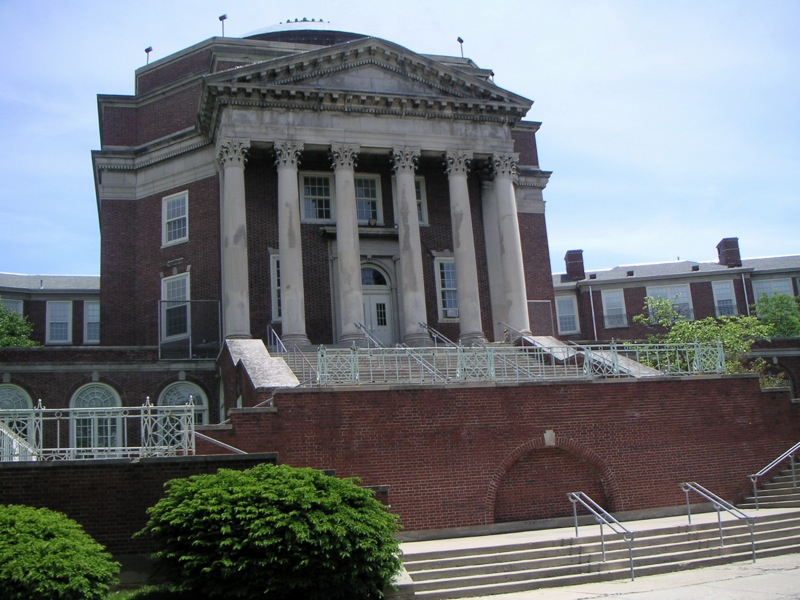
Front of Walnut Hills High School

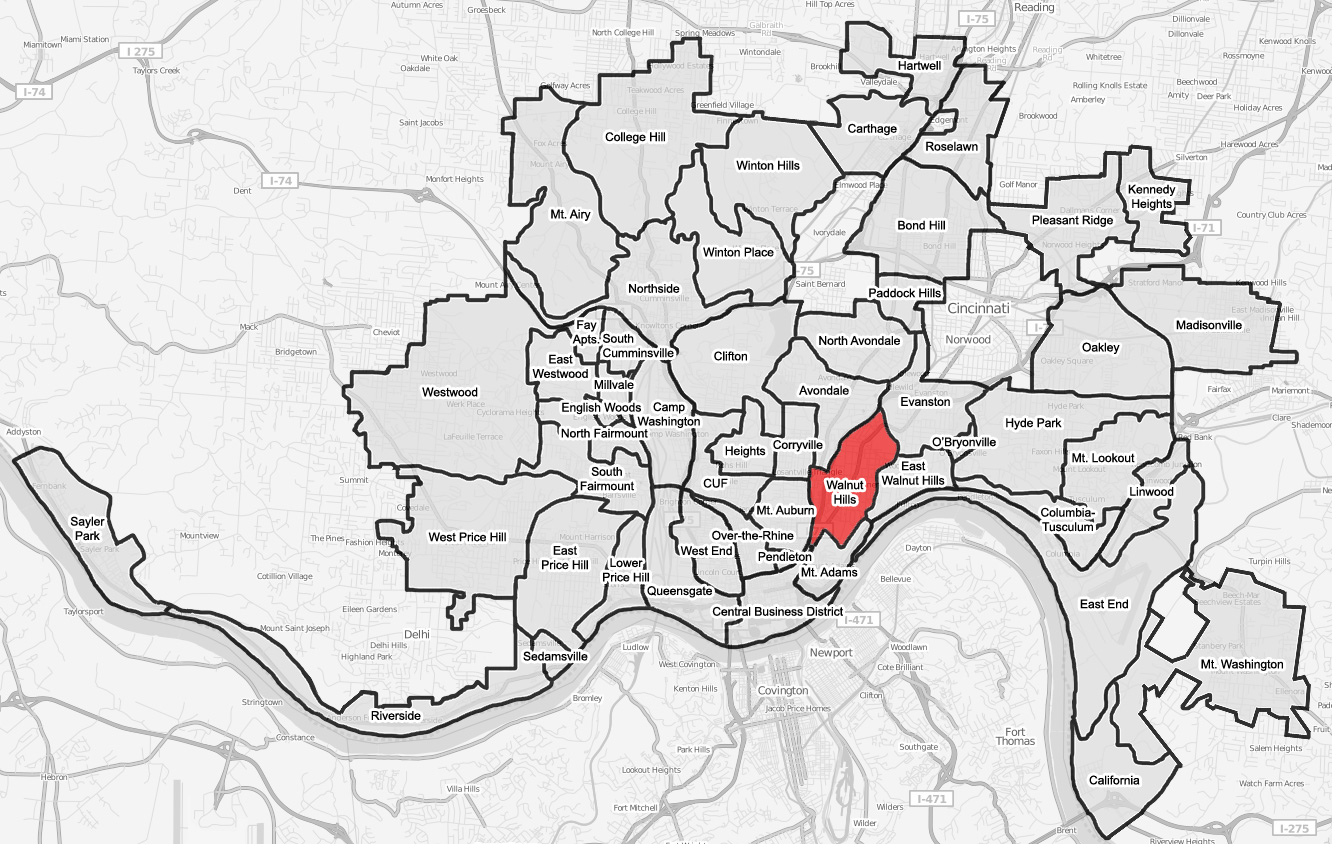
Walnut Hills is now a neighborhood of Cincinnati, Ohio.

Decades later, she recorded the following anecdote about her first day at Walnut High School, in what was then a suburb of Cincinnati:

(After a reading by the teacher from a textbook about the contributions by all the races, but that said the black race made no significant contribution and had been created to be subservient to the more fortunate races.) Can you imagine? Two little black girls in a school full of white children, and a classroom of white children, and with all the candor and cruelty of the young, the entire class looked at us and there were of course a few snickers and grins. It was then that I remembered my grandmother. I felt as if the klan was standing there with the guns trained on me. With great resentment and resolve I stood up and said 'I was taught in a black school that Africans worked iron before Europeans knew anything about it. I was taught that they knew how to cast bronze in making statues and that they worked in gold and ivory so beautifully that the European nations came to their shores tho buy their carvings and statues. That is what I was taught in a black school. There was an electrical silence. But friends can you imagine; if there had been no protest, what ingrained prejudice and hostility would have been implanted in the minds of those children, and what humiliation and degradation would have been stamped upon us."

Austin graduated in 1924 from the high school.

== College, the Law, and Baháʼí Faith ==
In 1928 Austin and seven other African-American women were admitted as students to University of Cincinnati (UC). Historically the number of black students had been limited here; the first known black attendee was not named in university records.

By the 1920s more blacks were being admitted to the university, as they were gaining preparation in the lower grades. Most were initially women, as blacks were admitted only to the College of Education to prepare for teaching careers, and most in that field were women. There were no black faculty members. Blacks were not allowed to live in the dorms and often boarded with families in town. They had limited access to the university pool or other amenities. Austin recalled that she and the other black students were advised by an administrator to avoid being 'conspicuous', to keep in mind they were 'members of a subject race', and to have 'low expectations'.

Decades later Austin commented on this meeting in her oral history:

We were young, sensitive, full of hope and aspiration for university education. That speech traumatized us. We sat down and discussed the situation. And then all 8 of us decided that we were going out for everything in the university. We almost took an oath in blood that we were all to finish that first year with honors in something. By the end of the year each one of us did take an honor. At the beginning of the next year that same official who had called us in and insulted us, apologized for her remarks.

Austin joined an inter-racial club on campus, and the young chapter of Delta Sigma Theta, a black sorority. Pictures of members of the black sororities or fraternities at the time were not published in the school yearbooks.

Austin was encouraged by her friends but angered by their treatment at the university. She later recounted talking with her father about this.

I was young, angry, incensed and hostile. I went to my father and told him I was going to become an agnostic or an atheist because 'I just don't believe anymore in these religions that are all separate, all fighting with each other, all enforcing prejudice against some group, and yet they say God is the father of all mankind.' My father heard me out, and then said 'Well before you do it, why don't you go and talk to these Cincinnati people who are talking about the Baháʼí Faith. He was not a Baháʼí but he said they have some interesting views.

She received her BA degree in 1928. Austin attended the University of Colorado Law School for a year, where she also worked on the student staff of the Rocky Mountain Law Review, which had a national reputation. When she returned to Ohio, she completed her law degree at University of Cincinnati, where she also earned a place on the Cincinnati Law Review. In April 1930 she represented Liberia in a mock League of Nations event on campus.

Austin received an LLB degree in 1930, becoming the first black woman to graduate from the University of Cincinnati Law School. Her father died before she graduated.

== Career ==
Austin passed the Indiana Bar that year, and was among the 22 black women lawyers in the state in 1930. She was one of the pioneers noted in the late 20th century by Goler Teal Butcher, a professor of international law at Howard University who established a scholarship for black women.

Austin's grandfather Robert Austin did live to see these achievements; he died in October 1930. By then Austin had returned to live with her widowed mother, who was inspired to go back to college.

In 1931 Austin opened a law practice in Indianapolis, Indiana, the state capital, with Henry J. Richardson Jr., also an African American. They were partners for two years, and he became active in the Democratic Party. (In 1932 he was one of the first two African Americans elected on the Democratic Party ticket to the state house of Indiana.)

Austin began to be active with the NAACP, sometimes speaking about its work, and also representing the organization in civil suits challenging segregation and restrictions. Austin also began taking a leadership role in Delta Sigma Theta sorority.

The Baháʼí community in Cincinnati is dated to at least to 1910. Austin began to learn about their practice. A joint meeting of Baháʼí communities of Ohio met in Cincinnati in June 1930, and the group held monthly public meetings in the city. A Baháʼí Local Spiritual Assembly, an administrative group of nine adults, was established in Cincinnati in 1933. Austin considered the religion, reading about it and attending meetings. She met Louis George Gregory, an African-American lawyer and leader in the Bahá'i faith, and Dorothy Baker, who were both influential members who helped her overcome her feelings of bitterness. In 1934 she joined the Baháʼí Faith.

== Move to Ohio ==
Austin had moved her law practice to Cincinnati, Ohio in 1933. That year, she represented the NAACP in its protest of allocations of public school funding, as segregated black schools were underfunded in comparison to ones for white students. She was approved to plead cases before the Ohio Supreme Court. She was also appointed to the Board of Trustees of Wilberforce University, an HBCU in Ohio that had been owned and operated by the AME Church since the Civil War.

Outside of work, Austin led a private study class on the Bahá'i Faith in 1935. The following year, she served on an all-Cincinnati, biracial YWCA committee that met at the West End YWCA, which served blacks who predominated in that part of the city. Affordable housing was a critical issue for lower income people in the city, but the YWCA had room for only 125 residents, and some could not afford to pay both room and board. The committee also met at a site for girls in the Y in Walnut Hills, then a predominately white suburb of the city.

== Assistant attorney general ==
In 1937 Austin was confirmed in her appointment as an assistant attorney general for Ohio under Herbert S. Duffy which made news in a number of venues, still living at the address of her family.

In March Austin received an honorary Doctor of Laws degree from Wilberforce University following her appointment to its board of trustees. She continued her work in a variety of settings - YMCA in public society, joined a regional committee overseeing the Baháʼí Faith in Ohio, Michigan, Indiana, and Kentucky, and presented at a symposium in Cleveland. Austin was soon also on a Baháʼí committee overseeing radio use by the religion.

By May she had been selected as secretary of the Cincinnati chapter of the NAACP and elected chair of legal committee of Colored Women Federated Clubs. She continued to be noted at speaking engagements and banquets while also named as a member of the state patrol board. The year closed with Austin elected as secretary of the Wilberforce University Board. She was also elected to the Board of the NAACP chapter. She gave a talk for the NAACP in December.

In 1938 Austin continued a busy speaking schedule, beginning with a February talk to a civic club. and for a Baháʼí youth symposium at YWCA, as well as at Green Acre Baháʼí School in Maine. In April she spoke for the NAACP in Dayton, and the youth bar association in Ohio. Her father was remembered during Memorial Day services.

When a successor to Austin was named for the Wilberforce board, his nomination generated controversy because of his ethnicity and religious affiliation. Pending resolution of objections to his nomination, Austin would continue to serve.

Austin was invited to present at a convention on the progress of African Americans. Charles Mason Remey gave a talk on the Baháʼí Faith at the Austin family home in October. and was among the speakers invited on the one hand, and being part of a Baháʼí symposium, and other religious meetings as well.

Because of technicalities, Attorney General Duffy ruled that Governor Davey's proposed appointment to the Wilbeforce board was illegal, and Austin was confirmed to continue as a holdover.

In February 1939 Austin was reported to serve on a committee interracial "good will" meeting, and present at a YWCA in March. In April Austin was among those attending a Kentucky Negro Educational Association conference in Louisville. In May she was among Cincinnati Baháʼís who went to the Baháʼí national convention. She was accompanied by her mother Mary Louise and brother George Austin, Jr.

She finished her two-year term as assistant attorney general. While it gave her many opportunities for building name recognition and a wide network through her public speaking, she gained little trial experience.

== Deltas, and Baháʼís ==
She started serving on the national legal advisory committee for the Baháʼí Faith.

By September she had moved to Washington, D.C. Over the next several years, she handled federal legal matters for the Office of Emergency Management and the National Labor Relations Board. In addition, she later served the city of Washington as advisor and as Recorder of Deeds. She was a legal advisor to the District of Columbia government in 1939 and next served as legal advisor to the Office of Price Administration, one of the New Deal agencies.

She also took on a leadership role with Delta Sigma Theta, being elected as the 8th president of the Delta Sigma Theta sorority in 1939; she was re-elected, serving until 1944. She also contributed to a Phi Beta Sigma national essay contest, and more meetings.

Austin addressed the Baháʼí national convention of the spring of 1940. and the 1940 US Census marked the monthly income for each mother and daughter earning circa $2400 recorded in Cincinnati - about $42k in 2018 dollars.

In 1941 she participated in a free legal aid bureau of the National Bar Association in January.

She led a youth class at Louhelen Baháʼí School in Michigan in July.

Women in the law were still so few that by 1941, Austin was counted among the first 58 women lawyers in the US. About 1941 she taught at the Robert H. Terrell Law School, becoming the third black woman to teach law in the US.

Continuing her work for the Deltas, she presented a "Jobs analysis and opportunities project"(aka OPA) at Delta meeting in 1941. In November Austin joined the Maryland, Virginia and D.C. Regional Teaching Committee responsible for overseeing efforts to promulgate the Baháʼí Faith in that area. She met with Deltas in Detroit for a Christmas meeting in December.

Commentary on social engagements followed her in 1942, Austin presented the Baháʼí teachings during a national meeting in June marking the anniversary of the founding of the religion. She continued providing service to the national legal advisory committee of the religion. There was comment that Austin worked, like Louis Gregory on travels in the South for the religion as well. In December Austin was reported as Delta President in the midst of coverage of the OPA program. Dwindling coverage shows Austin among the speakers at a Missouri Deltas meeting, and a freshman orientation (though the coverage didn't say where,) while in September Austin was back at Green Acre.

In 1944 Austin was featured during the observance of the centenary of the foundational Baháʼí holy day, the Declaration of the Báb, in a radio interview that was broadcast, and the work of the Race Unity national committee of the Baháʼís also underscored her work. Though the dates are unknown, Claude Albert Barnett, founder of the Associated Negro Press in 1919, corresponded with Austin.

== National Spiritual Assembly of the Baháʼís of the United States ==
In the balloting of the 1945 national Baháʼí convention, Austin had held the leading position outside of the final members elected. At the June anniversary of the visit of ʻAbdu'l-Bahá, then leader of the religion, to New Jersey, Austin gave a talk about "Bases for a durable peace" in the last months of WWII. It had interrupted Baha'i plans for international expansion. Austin and fellow Baháʼí Marzieh Gail were at Louhelen Bahaʼi School in the summer of 1945, and it was noted Austin's term as president of the Deltas was over. Austin appeared again at Green Acre Baháʼí School. She also served on the D.C. Baháʼí regional convention committee to elect delegates to the national convention. Amidst a national campaign of meetings for the religion, Austin was among those making an appearance in Boston, and then in Pittsburgh in a contrasting tone to that elsewhere in the black community, though the Baháʼís were "electrified", February ended noting her talk in Cincinnati "Security for a fearful world". Near the close of the 1945-6 term of the National Assembly of the Baháʼís of the United States and Canada, Roy Wilhelm resigned for reasons of health. The delegates for the year elected Austin as replacement in a by-election, giving her more than twice the votes of the next candidate. She took office in March 1946. Austin's term in office overlapped that of Louis George Gregory for the remainder of that year.

Austin was elected again to the National Spiritual Assembly again in 1946. That year Shoghi Effendi, head of the religion, called for the Second Seven-Year Plan. He noted that the interior ornamentation and landscaping of the Baháʼí House of Worship in Wilmette needed completion. He also proposed establishing National Spiritual Assemblies in South America, Central America, and Canada; and reestablishing the religion in Europe following the terrible losses and disruption of the war. In July Austin was part of a regional Baháʼí conference including a race unity round table. She also participated in meetings and talks at the Hampton Institute in July. fShe spoke in early November in Urbana, Illinois, for the Baháʼís. There were 800 attendees and the event was broadcast over local radio.

Austin spoke before a larger group in Baltimore in late January 1947, and a small group in Atlanta in February. In February Austin was a delegate to the International Council of Women conference called by the United Nations Department of Information at Lake Success, New York. Austin was reported to be giving a talk to Baháʼí in Los Angeles in later March. She returned to speak in Atlanta to a larger meeting. The Atlanta community had had some race incidents with the KKK and affiliated groups in April. They were seeking a Center that would be safe. Approaching mid-April, Austin was among the honorees of past Delta presidents. while the Cincinnati Baháʼís elected an assembly with mother Mary L. Austin and brother George Austin,

The national convention discussed KKK raids in the South that terrorized blacks. Austin said, "We must formally protest such actions to the authorities; mixed [interracial] religious groups are meeting in the South today". Austin was elected again to the National Spiritual Assembly.

In January 1948 Austin gave a talk for the Baháʼís in Dayton, Ohio, with the Baháʼí community thankful for the newspaper coverage. It was also noted she was chairman of the legal committee for the National Council for Colored Women, (NCNW). She was in Cincinnati in February, and then a symposium on women and the United Nations in March. The goal of Canada forming its own national Baháʼí assembly was achieved and Austin attended their first Canadian national convention, and co-presented during a 2 hour public meeting there. Austin was again elected to the US national assembly, spoke at the public meeting during that session and at the convention Austin and Borrah Kavelin held and presented on a workshop "Education to remove prejudice" for attendees of the convention. In October Austin was at a National Council of Negro Women meeting at the White House saying a Baháʼí prayer, and was visible at a "One world concert" held in D.C.

In January 1959 National Freedom Day was held in Philadelphia and Austin was a speaker, during which she made comments of ʻAbdu'l-Bahá visiting, and in March Austin was among the NAACP effort at the Capital. In April it was announced Austin was on the National Programming Committee coordinating and producing all types of materials for the promotion of the religion, and was elected to the national assembly. A reception for Austin was held by a chapter of the Deltas in Georgia in May, and it was mentioned Austin was on the National Labor Relations Board in June. Consultation for the Baháʼí national convention included the virtues needed and encouraged including comments by Austin. Indeed the second recommendation at the convention was that Austin's workshops and comments on consultation be published. The national assembly organization was established as a Trust with Austin among the trustees. and in November Austin was visible in D.C. black society.

In 1950 volume 10 of The Baháʼí World reviewed the centenary observance and included Austin's roll, and was part of the report of the national assembly to the community. Austin was among many at a select reception in South Carolina for Julius Waties Waring at the end of March. General comment on the broad Baháʼí growth in the country and the national assembly election mentioned Austin in Hawaii, The Baháʼís observed the centenary of the execution of the Báb in July with a panel presided over by Austin. In September Austin gave a talk on International Women's Day at a church in Cincinnati.

In 1952 Austin's article "World Unity as a way of life" was included in volume 11 of The Baháʼí World. In it she states:

The achievement of effective understanding and cooperation among the diverse nations, races, and classes of mankind is the chief essential for the survival of civilization. This urgent need is only partially fulfilled by the political, social, and economic theories proffered today. The great and powerful religions emphasize this need in their proclamations, but their practical programs have barely touched the issues involved.… Even as the love of God gives a man new values with which to measure other men and his relationship with them, it also gives him a deeper regard for the law and order which are the basis for any progressive society. Loyalty to spiritual principle and conscientious use of it in human affairs is the beginning of social order and security. The spiritual laws of God give man his great ethical standards. Belief in God and sincere effort to live one's faith are the generative forces of man's conscience. When human conscience and social ethics are united in their objectives there is cooperation between inner and outer disciplines. The result is a matured and refined individual and society.

Late in August the Louhelen School youth program was held with an Austin led class "Divine Art of Living". The 1951 election returned Austin to the national assembly, and she was chair of the Africa committee which reported to the convention on progress of the religion there as well as seeking more connections. In September mother Mary Louise Austin died while visiting Austin; burial was at Colored American Cemetery, in Oakley, Ohio. In October the first coordinated pioneers moving to promote the religion were arriving in Africa.

The 1952 national Baháʼí convention elected Austin though spreading information of it was delayed. Austin's work on the African committee focused on job opportunities. In June Austin contributed to the "Souvenir Unity Feast" for the religion in New Jersey. In November Louis G. Gregory died and Austin was among the many who spoke at the memorial service. Austin was requested to compile a memorial article on Gregory.

== Pioneer and Knight of Baháʼu'lláh to Morocco ==
As 1953 opened with the news of the Baháʼí Ten Year Crusade, a program to expand the presence of the religion especially in Africa. Austin was a member of the United States International Teaching Committee reporting on progress started previously, followed by appearing at a World Religion Day observance in Wilmington, Delaware, with coverage by WDEL-TV as it was then called. In February the Baháʼís held a conference in Uganda including Austin, as a representative of the US National Baháʼí Assembly. Austin undertook her Baháʼí pilgrimage. American newspaper coverage of Austin's travels to Africa and Europe mentioned her in March, while she returned in April to Cincinnati marking the centenary year of the declaration at Ridván of Baháʼu'lláh, founder of the religion, and the dedication of the House of Worship in Chicago. Austin returned to Cincinnati again in June, chair of the African Committee by September, and into September Austin herself resigned to pioneer to promote the religion requiring another by-election. Ultimately five members resigned to move overseas to promote the religion - Elsie Austin, Dorothy Baker, Matthew Bullock, W. Kenneth Christian and Mamie Seto - and they were replaced by Lawrence Hautz, Charles Wolcott, Charlotte Linfoot, Robert McLaughlin and Margery McCormick.

Austin moved to what was then called the Morocco International Zone centered on Tangier, credited with arriving October 23, 1953, for which she was ultimately named a Knight of Baháʼu'lláh. She was named a teacher at the American School of Tangier, during which time she also helped establish Baháʼí communities in northern and western Africa. She still managed to make the news back in the States early, and later 1954. She was appointed as one of the first members of the Auxiliary Board for Africa, assisting Musa Banání.

In 1955 Austin wrote the 18 page booklet Above All Barriers: The Story of Louis G. Gregory which was reprinted in 1964, 1965, 1969, and 1976. Austin wrote of the need for virtues amidst the challenges of pioneering where "all the world's prejucides are on parade". A regional national assembly for north-west Africa was elected by the Baháʼís in 1956 where Austin and Enoch Olinga served as officers of the convention and Austin serving then as chair of the national assembly. She was elected, and chair, again in 1957.

== Stateside ==
Austin returned to the States again in August 1957 and gave a talk in Hackensack, New Jersey, though she expected to return soon. Still she was in Cincinnati in March 1958 for a reception at Wilberforce. She worked as executive director of the D.C. office of the National Council of Negro Women (NCNW) and their convention in D.C., and reported as a member of the Intercontinental Teaching committee at the US Baháʼí national convention. In July Austin was part of the NCNW reception for the visiting dignitary Kwame Nkrumah then prime minister of Ghana. In October Austin spoke in Chester, Pennsylvania, for a regional meeting of Baháʼís. In November Austin served through the NCNW as it organized exhibits of African-American women at the 35th Women's International Exposition. In May 1959 Austin continued her work with NCNW for a regional convention in New York. Circa June NCNW had a conference giving awards, announcing studies and newspaper coverage mentioned her comment that "inter-racial participation in the conference inspired a hope for a changed attitude toward minority groups in the South." Austin also presided at a meeting on the evening of the centenary of the execution of the Báb. In late May Austin attended a leadership NCNW meeting in Daytona, Florida, directly before going in June to St. Petersburg, and gave a talk for the Baháʼís as part of observing Race Unity Day. In October Austin was back as executive director for NCNW presenting at a meeting in D.C. In October Austin was part of the NCNW reception for the Ghana YWCA representative.

== United States Information Agency ==
Austin was awarded an honorary degree from the University of Cincinnati in 1960, and then was back in north-west Africa, this time in the then named British Cameroons, for the convention to elect the regional national assembly of north west Africa again and was elected. There there was a link made, and she was hired for the United States Information Agency as a cultural attaché, for in 1961 a news bit mentioned she was in Nigeria, and expecting visitors in the fall. According to USIA reports, Austin served as Women's Activities Officer for West Africa from 1960-1965, before assuming similar responsibilities in East Africa. She was a teacher living in Lagos. She returned, and while in D.C. participated in a commemoration of the visit of ʻAbdu'l-Bahá to D.C., visiting kin in Ohio and further training in the summer of 1962. She was described as having served as a "women's affairs officer" and had been to Liberia, Ghana, and Togo. She managed a visit with Delta sisters in October. As a member of a national assembly, Austin helped elect the first Universal House of Justice in April 1963. She returned to Nigeria. In 1964 Austin was alternate to Gladys Avery Tillett for Lomé seminar, then cultural affairs officer of Lagos, Nigeria. Austin was returned in the summer of 1965 to Ohio,

Austin was noted in Nairobi, Kenya, October, 1967. In December Austin took part in a Baháʼí inter-continental conference in Kampala, Uganda, Ultimately Austin served on Local Spiritual Assemblies in Morocco, Nigeria, Kenya, and the Bahamas.

In 1968 the USIA recognized her achievements by nominating her for the Federal Women's Award, and by the late summer was giving a talk as part of an observance of the Baháʼí holy day the Birth of the Báb in Cincinnati. In November she was in D.C. for a Deltas meeting, now a regional women's affairs for east Africa.

In January 1969 Austin returned to the States and was interviewed. "One of the happy things in my work is realizing all people of the world are really alike." She worked for USIA for 8 years, and visited with the Deltas during the trip. In June she was awarded an honorary Doctor of Humane Letters by the University of Cincinnati.

Among her last actions in the diplomatic service, in 1970 Austin edited the bulletin Community Action collected into a bound volume, and retired.

== Retiring to the States ==
After she returned to the United States, Austin was frequently invited to speak to academic and community groups about her experiences. She also wrote about colleagues and

=== Publications ===
- "In Memoriam; Matthew W. Bullock, 1881-1972, Knight of Baha'u'llah", a chapter included in Baha'i World (1975).
- Austin contributed "Treasured gold", a story about Louis Gregory for Child's Way journal, published in August 1976.
- She reported in Bahaʼi News (March 1977) on an international Baháʼí conference held the previous October in Nairobi, Kenya.

=== Speeches ===
In April 1972 Austin was the keynote speaker at a symposium of the African-American Studies Program at Hampton Institute in Virginia. She spoke on "The Aura of African-American Studies in the '70s". A couple of days later she participated in the 3rd annual International Women's Day program in Cincinnati.

In December 1973, she spoke on Human Rights Day at the college club at University of Wisconsin- Oshkosh. She also spoke that day at a public meeting in nearby Appleton, Wisconsin. Her talk was summarized in the local newspaper.

In 1974 Austin was noted in the Baháʼí News as among the national assembly members who had decided to pioneer, moving in the 1950s to Africa to spread the faith. In early May 1975 Austin was in Cincinnati to speak at the Optimist Welfare Club, which was marking its anniversary. Later that May, Austin chaired the Baháʼí delegation that traveled to the International Women's Conference in Mexico City. In November Austin was a keynote speaker at Texas A&M for a talk: "Women and the Crisis Frontiers: development, justice and peace". It was part of their equality campaign. At the time Austin was working for the Domestic Education Assistance Program of the Phelps Stokes Fund. Its mission was to work on African-American and Native American education issues.

In 1982 Austin was among the founding members of the Friends of the Andrew Rankin Memorial Chapel at Howard University. She had an extensive trip to China that year on behalf of the Phelps Stokes Fund. She traveled for weeks to inspect schools, businesses and community services affecting education and opportunities for minorities. Circa 1985 Austin was living in Washington, D.C.

Austin returned to Cincinnati a few times in the 1990s. In October 1990 she appeared on the program at the Women's Day program of the Mt. Zion United Methodist Church. Austin returned to Cincinnati in the summer of 1996 to help dedicate the new Baháʼí Center.

=== Turn of the millennium ===
Austin contributed to the history Rebels in Law: Voices in History of Black Women Lawyers (2000). In it she identified racism as dividing America:

This force of disunity (outlined by a quote of ʻAbdu'l-Bahá) especially as it is generated from racial prejudice is the most dangerous issue in America today. The race issue has become the most subtle and powerful contract of the American people used by the forces most opposed to democracy in any form. Through it we can see the thing ʻAbdu'l-Bahá spoke of actually coming to pass. Black and white, we are being played against each other and against ourselves. For every group which rises to liberalize and unite the people there are others surely at work under cover dividing and agitating.… Now is the time for every bit of organization, strength and for all types of leadership to unite in an educational campaign to mould new ideas of Americanism and race and to develop a sense of unity in the American people.… Brotherhood is no longer an idea in this age, it is a social necessity without which all men will be in danger of extermination.… When the time for showdown comes as it must we shall not be able to hold these victories in the face of heightened tension, bitterness and strain unless we have developed a powerful force for public opinion between white and black America and a strong sense of unity."

Austin lived in Silver Spring, Maryland, just outside Washington, D.C., for years before moving to San Antonio, Texas in June 2004. She died there of congestive heart failure aggravated by asthma on 26 October 2004. Public memorial services were held at the Baháʼí Houses of Worship in the United States and in Uganda.

== Legacy and honors ==
- In 1991 the University of Cincinnati Alumni Association awarded Austin its Distinguished Alumni Award.
- In 1998 the Baha'i in Cincinnati established a scholarship in Austin's name for students who worked against prejudice.
- In 2002 the University of Cincinnati College of Law established a scholarship in Austin's name. She was unable to attend the reunion event where it was announced.
- In 2007 Austin was among 20 alumni inducted into Walnut Hill High School's new Hall of Fame.

== See also ==
- List of first women lawyers and judges in Indiana
