= Mentor Dotson =

American politician (c. 1837–?)

Alabama House of Representatives for Sumter County, Alabama
- In office 1872–1874

Personal details
- Born: c. 1837 Georgia, U.S.
- Relations: Helen Elsie Austin (grandchild)

Mentor Dotson (c. 1837–?), was an American politician, teacher, minister, and storekeeper. As a state legislator he represented Sumter County, Alabama in the Alabama House of Representatives from 1872–1874. He has been noted as Minter Dotson, Minter Dawson, and Minter Dodson.

He was Black and born enslaved around 1837 or 1838 in Georgia. His November 19, 1872 election certificate was reproduced in a cookbook published by the National Council of Negro Women in 2000.

Mary Louise Dotson was his daughter; she worked at Tuskegee Institute and was married George James Austin. Their children included Helen Elsie Austin.

== See also ==
- African American officeholders from the end of the Civil War until before 1900
