= Nicole Stelle Garnett =

American lawyer

Nicole Stelle Garnett (born January 7, 1970) is the John P. Murphy Foundation Professor of Law at Notre Dame Law School, teaching in the areas of property, land use, urban development, local government law, and education. She has written numerous articles on these subjects that have appeared in a variety of journals, including the Michigan Law Review, the Stanford Law Review, and the Yale Law Journal. Additionally, she wrote Ordering the City: Land Use, Policing and the Restoration of Urban America, published by Yale University Press in 2009. Garnett also serves on the Board of Directors of the Federalist Society.

== Biography ==
Garnett majored in political science and graduated Phi Beta Kappa from Stanford University. She earned her J.D. from Yale Law School in 1995, then clerked for Judge Morris Sheppard Arnold on the U.S. Court of Appeals for the Eighth Circuit. She practiced at the Institute for Justice for two years before clerking for Justice Clarence Thomas on the United States Supreme Court during the 1998–1999 term.

In 1999, Garnett joined the faculty at University of Notre Dame. In spring 2007, she was a visiting faculty member at the University of Chicago Law School. In 2009, Garnett received the Paul M. Bator Award, given annually by the Federalist Society for Law and Policy Studies to an academic under 40 for excellence in teaching, scholarship, and commitment to students. In 2014, she co-authored a study on Catholic education and urban conditions, "Lost Classroom, Lost Community: Catholic Schools' Importance in Urban America." In the book, she argued the presence of Catholic schools strengthens the community. In 2016, she received the Reinhold Neibuhr Award from the University of Notre Dame for scholarship advancing social justice.

In 2025, Amy Coney Barrett recused herself from a Supreme Court decision on federal funding for religious charter schools centered on St. Isidore of Seville Catholic Virtual School in Oklahoma, where Garnett, Barrett's close friend, is an advisor.

== Personal life ==
She is married to Richard W. Garnett, who is Paul J. Schierl/Fort Howard Corporation Professor of Law at the University of Notre Dame.

== See also ==
- List of law clerks for the tenth seat of the Supreme Court of the United States
