= Carol Ann Mooney =

American academic

11th President of Saint Mary's College
- In office 2004–2016
- Preceded by: Dr. Marilou Eldred
- Succeeded by: Janice Cervelli

Personal details
- Born: Norwich, New York
- Spouse: George Efta
- Education: Saint Mary's College (BA); University of Notre Dame (JD)
- Profession: College President, Author

Carol Ann Mooney is the 11th president of Saint Mary's College in Notre Dame, Indiana (2004–2016). She is the first lay alumna president of the college.

== Life ==
Mooney grew up in Norwich, New York. She graduated from Saint Mary's College in 1972 with a Bachelor of Arts degree in English. She went on to earn her J.D. degree from the University of Notre Dame Law School in 1977, where she graduated first in her class and received the Colonel William J. Hoynes award. She practiced law from 1977-78 as an associate attorney in the Washington, D.C., firm of Jones, Day, Reavis and Pogue.

Mooney became a faculty member of the University of Notre Dame Law School in 1980. She received the law school's "Teacher of the Year" award in 1983. She later served terms as both assistant and associate dean of the law school. She served as the vice president and associate provost of Notre Dame from 1996-2004. While there, she was a member of several committees, including the Academic Council, the Provost's Advisory Committee, the Academic Affirmative Action Committee, the University Committee on Women Faculty and Students. and the Laetare Medal and Notre Dame Award selection committees. She also chaired the University Committee on Cultural Diversity.

Mooney is the co-author of two books, along with numerous articles in law reviews and other scholarly periodicals. She is a member of Phi Beta Kappa and was elected a member of the American Law Institute in 1988. U.S. Supreme Court Chief Justice William Rehnquist named her a member of the standing Advisory Committee of the Judicial Conference of the United States on the Federal Rules of Appellate Procedure, for which she had served as reporter for 12 years.

Carol Ann is known for her collection of colorful eye-glasses. She owns a different pair for almost every outfit she owns.
