= Paul M. Lewis (diplomat) =

American lawyer and diplomat

Paul Lewis
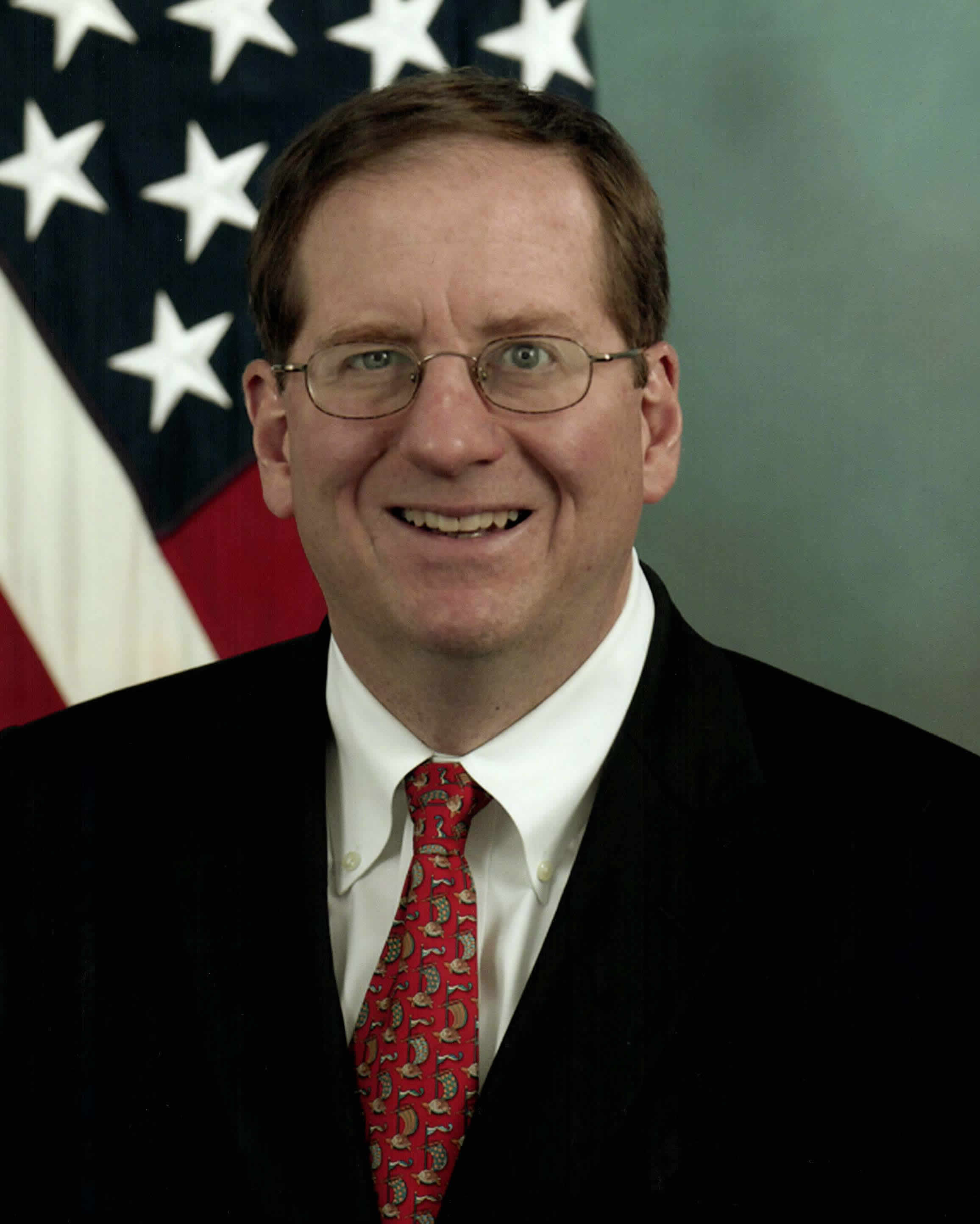
- Paul Lewis
- Other name: Paul M. Lewis
- Education: University of Notre Dame (A.B., 1980; J.D., 1983)
- Occupations: Lawyer, diplomat
- Known for: Appointed to help close Guantanamo

Paul Lewis is an American lawyer and diplomat. Lewis served as Marine JAG officer and chief counsel to House Armed Services Committee, before President Obama appointed him as Special Envoy for Guantanamo Bay facility closure.

== Early life and education ==
Lewis earned a bachelor's degree from the University of Notre Dame in 1980 and his J.D. degree from Notre Dame Law School in 1983.

== Career ==
He rose to the rank of captain, within the Marine Corps, during the five years he served as a JAG officer. He had also served as an Assistant District Attorney in Manhattan, and an anti-racketeering prosecutor for the Department of Justice, before holding a series of posts as counsels to Congressional Representatives, or to Congressional committees. Obama had announced the creation of two positions during a speech about Guantanamo at the Defense University in May 2013. William Lietzau, the most recent Deputy Assistant Secretary of Defense for Detainee Affairs had resigned in July, without being replaced. Lewis's position was not a direct replacement for the empty DASD-DA position. The other position was that of a special envoy for Guantanamo closure within the State Department. That position had been filled in June, by Clifford Sloan. On October 7, 2013 President Barack Obama appointed Lewis to be United States Department of Defense's Special Envoy for Guantanamo Closure, the most senior Pentagon official tasked with closing the notorious Guantanamo Bay detention camps, in Cuba. Lewis is currently a law professor at Georgetown University. Carol Rosenberg, writing in the Miami Herald, reported that, at Georgetown Lewis had specialized in teaching legal ethics.

The Hill reported Lewis also had responsibility for finding new homes for the foreigners the USA held in extrajudicial detention in Afghanistan.
