= List of first minority male lawyers and judges in Indiana =

This is a list of the first minority male lawyer(s) and judge(s) in Indiana. It includes the year in which the men were admitted to practice law (in parentheses). Also included are other distinctions such as the first minority men in their state to graduate from law school or become a political figure.

== Firsts in Indiana's history ==
=== Lawyers ===
- First African American male: John R. Byrd (1878)
- First Asian American male (of Japanese descent): Masuji Miyakawa (1905)

=== Law clerk ===
- First African American male (Supreme Court of Indiana): Howard Stevenson in 1993

=== State judges ===
- First African American male (temporary jurist): Henry J. Richardson Jr. in 1930
- First African American male: Mercer M. Mance in 1958
- First Latino American male: Lorenzo Arredondo (1972) around 1976
- First Asian Pacific American male: G. Michael "Mike" Witte (1982) in 1984
- First African American male (Indiana Court of Appeals): Robert D. Rucker (1976) in 1990
- First Muslim American male: David Shaheed in 1999

=== Federal judges ===
- First Hispanic American male (federal judge): Rodolfo Lozano in 1988
- First Hispanic American male (Southern District Of Indiana): Mario Garcia in 2020

=== Attorney General of Indiana ===
- First African American male: Curtis Hill in 2017

=== Assistant Attorney General ===
- First African American male: Robert L. Bailey from 1929-1933

=== United States Attorney ===
- First African American male (Southern District of Indiana): Zachary A. Myers in 2021
- First African American male (Northern District of Indiana): Clifford D. Johnson in 2021

=== Indiana State Bar Association ===
- First Jewish American male president: Nathan Morris in 1903
- First African American male president: Rod Morgan in 2010

== Firsts in local history ==
- Jesús Ricardo Treviño: First Latino American male judge in Allen County, Indiana (2021)
- Joe Rapier: First African American male lawyer in Gary, Lake County, Indiana
- William Clarence Hueston, Sr.: First African American male to serve as a judge in Gary, Lake County, Indiana (1924)
- James C. Kimbrough: First African American male appointed as a Judge of the Lake County Superior Court, Indiana
- Salvador Vasquez: First Latino American male to serve as a Judge of the Lake County Criminal Court, Indiana (2003)
- Alfredo Estrada: First Latino American male to serve as President of the Lake County Bar Association (2022)
- Rudolph "Rudy" R. Pyle III: First African American male judge in Madison County, Indiana
- Gonzalo Manibog: First Filipino American male to graduate from the Indiana Law School in Indianapolis (1917) [Marion County, Indiana]
- James T.V. Hill: First African American male lawyer in Indianapolis, Marion County, Indiana
- Jose Salinas: First Latino American male elected as a judge in Marion County, Indiana
- Masuji Miyakawa: First Japanese American male to graduate from Indiana University Maurer School of Law (1905) [Monroe County, Indiana]
- Francisco Delgado, Mariano H. de Joya, and Jorge C. Bocobo: First Filipino males to earn LLB degrees from the Indiana University Maurer School of Law (1907) [Monroe County, Indiana]
- Samuel Saul Dargan: First African American male to graduate from Indiana University Maurer School of Law (1909) [Monroe County, Indiana]
- Juan T. Santos: First Hispanic American male to graduate from Indiana University Maurer School of Law (1916) [Monroe County, Indiana]
- Joseph Chester Allen, Jr.: First African American male to serve as the President of the St. Joseph Bar Association [St. Joseph County, Indiana]
- Peter LaCava: First Italian American male lawyer in Mishawaka, St. Joseph County, Indiana

== See also ==
- List of first minority male lawyers and judges in the United States

== Other topics of interest ==
- List of first women lawyers and judges in the United States
- List of first women lawyers and judges in Indiana
