= Indiana Superior Courts =

Type of courts

The U.S. State of Indiana has two types of state courts: Trial Courts and Appellate Courts. Trial courts are courts of general jurisdiction, meaning they have the power to hear any civil or criminal case. Indiana Superior Courts is one of four trial courts in Indiana State; the other three are Circuit Courts, County Courts, and City or Town Courts. The four courts have more similarities than differences in their functions.

The Superior Court is an additional court created by the Indiana General Assembly in response to the growing local need for more trial courts. Most Indiana trial courts are Superior Courts, and nearly all Indiana counties have a Superior Court in addition to their Circuit Court. The Superior Court will handle small claims and minor offenses in the absence of a county court system.

== Details ==
"Trial courts have different names primarily due to accidents of legislative history and local custom, not true differences in the nature or purpose of the courts. The cases these courts hear can vary tremendously from county to county." For example, in Howard County, Indiana, with a population of less than 100,000, the Circuit Court is a court of general jurisdiction over civil and criminal cases and exclusive jurisdiction over juvenile cases, while the Superior Court 1 primarily hears criminal drug and domestic violence cases. By contrast, in Marion County, Indiana's largest county, the Superior Court "has jurisdiction over all criminal cases, civil issues and family case types filed in the county."

In 2016, the Indiana Supreme Court began a Commercial Court Pilot Project in six county Superior Courts, appointing "Marion Superior Court Judge Heather Welch; Elkhart Superior Court Judge Stephen Bowers; Lake Superior Court Judge John Sedia; Floyd Superior Court Judge Maria Granger; Vanderburgh Superior Court Judge Richard D'Amour; and Allen Superior Court Judge Craig Bobay." In 2020, the Supreme Court expanded the now permanent Commercial Court into four more counties, three with Superior Courts (Hamilton, Vigo, and St. Joseph) and one with a Circuit Court (Madison).

Judges are typically elected to the Superior Court, except in limited circumstances.
