= George J. Austin =

American military officer (c. 1881–1930)

George James Austin
- Born: c. 1881; Cincinnati, Ohio, U.S.
- Died: August 19, 1930; Cincinnati, Ohio, U.S.
- Education: Tuskegee Institute, Fort Des Moines Provisional Army Officer Training School
- Occupations: Military officer, ducator, insurance salesman, activist
- Spouse: Mary Louise Dotson (m. 1906–1930; death)
- Children: 4, including Helen Elsie Austin
- Relatives: Mentor Dotson (father in-law)

George James Austin Sr. (c. 1881 – August 19, 1930), was an American military officer, educator, and insurance salesman. He was a Black military officer in the United States, who served in the Spanish-American War and World War I. He worked for Black representation in the U.S. military during a time of racial segregation. Austin served on-campus as a military educator at historically Black colleges, including Prairie View College (now Prairie View A&M University), Tuskegee Institute (now Tuskegee University), and St. Paul Normal and Industrial School (now Saint Paul's College).

== Early life and education ==
George James Austin was born in 1881 or 1887 in Cincinnati, Ohio, to parents Jane and Robert Austin. His father Robert was one of the earliest Black residents in the city of Cincinnati.

He trained at Fort Des Moines Provisional Army Officer Training School, and attended Tuskegee Institute (now Tuskegee University).

== Career ==
Austin served in the volunteer army during the Spanish-American War. He also served in the United States Army in World War I from 1917 to 1919. He was in the 92nd Infantry Division (and 317th Engineer Regiment). Austin attained the military rank of major.

In 1912, Austin was commandant (similar to modern-day ROTC commandant) at Prairie View College (now Prairie View A&M University). He also served as a commandant at Tuskegee Institute; and as the commodore of cadets at St. Paul Normal and Industrial School (now Saint Paul's College) in Lawrenceville, Virginia, where he followed the "colored regiment campaign".

He noted around 1917, that Blacks were prohibited from attending the fourteen officer training camps on the United States. In 1917, Austin corresponded with civil rights activist Joel Elias Spingarn. He wrote general Leonard Wood about a segregated summer camp for college students.

Austin eventually moved to Cincinnati and entered the insurance business. He died on August 19, 1930 at St. Mary's Hospital in Cincinnati.

Posthumously Austin was honored at the Cincinnati Memorial Day Parade in 1938.

== Personal life and family ==
Austin married Mary Louise Dotson in 1906. They had a few children together. Austin's father in-law (and Mary Louise's father) was Alabama politician, Mentor Dotson.

Austin was the father of Helen Elsie Austin, an attorney and Baháʼí faith leader. Elsie Austin was another of his daughters, she was the first black female graduate of Cincinnati Law School (now University of Cincinnati College of Law) in the 1920s.
