= Elizabeth Eaglesfield =

American lawyer (1853–1940)

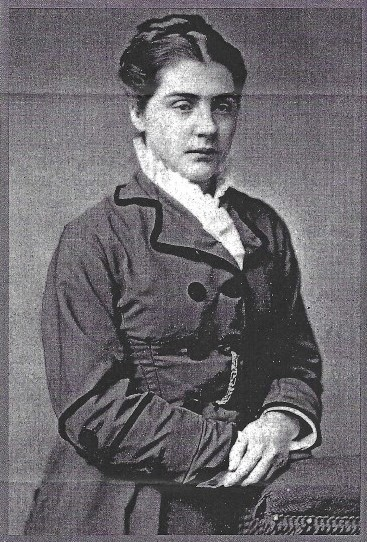
- Eaglesfield's student portrait, taken at the University of Michigan School of Law
- Born: 1853; Clay County, Indiana, US
- Died: 1940 (aged 86–87)
- Education: University of Michigan

Elizabeth Eaglesfield (1853–1940) was the first woman admitted to the Indiana state bar and the first practicing female attorney in the city of Grand Rapids, Michigan, in 1875. She was also a Great Lakes ship captain, the owner of a fruit shipping business, and real estate magnate in Benton Harbor, Michigan. She was inducted into the Michigan Women's Hall of Fame in 2013 for her accomplishments in the fields of business and law.

== Early life and education ==
Elizabeth Eaglesfield was born June 29, 1853, in Clay County, Indiana, and attended high school in Terre Haute. She later attended the University of Michigan, receiving a degree in literature in 1876 and in law in 1878.

== Career in law ==
Elizabeth Eaglesfield began her notable legal career by being the first woman admitted to the Indiana State Bar in 1875, 3 years before earning a law degree. She was the first practicing female attorney in Grand Rapids, Michigan. Eaglesfield focused on providing legal assistance to minors and widows. Her specialties included litigating cases involving property disputes, divorce, and violence. Eaglesfield also used her legal expertise to become a successful businesswoman and real estate mogul in Benton Harbor and a maritime lawyer on the Great Lakes.

== Captain of the Golden Girl ==
In addition to her legal practice, Elizabeth Eaglesfield captained a steamship named the Golden Girl which was completed in 1909 for a cost of $10,000. The Golden Girl could carry up to ten thousand cases of fruit from Benton Harbor to various ports around the Great Lakes. Eaglesfield's legal expertise served her well on the Great Lakes, exemplified by winning a 1911 dispute with Milwaukee, Wisconsin, police who challenged her right to sell produce from the harbor. Her career as a captain continued until her retirement in 1930, leaving behind a fleet of five fruit boats that her son continued to operate.

== See also ==
- List of first women lawyers and judges in Indiana
