= Mark Gimenez =

American Author and Lawyer

- Occupations: Author, lawyer
- Writing career
- Language: English
- Genre: Thriller

Mark Gimenez is an author and lawyer from Texas. He specializes in the thriller genre writing, especially legal thrillers. His first novel, The Color of Law, was a New York Times bestseller. He also runs his own solo law practice.

== Biography ==
Gimenez grew up in La Marque, Galveston County, Texas. He studied Political Science at Southwest Texas State University in San Marcos, Texas, and earned a B.A. with honors. He then attended Notre Dame Law School in Indiana and earned a J.D. degree magna cum laude in 1980.

He practiced law with a large Dallas law firm and became a partner. After ten years he left to practice solo and to write. He lives outside Fort Worth, Texas with his wife and two sons.

== Books ==
- The Color of Law, A. Scott Fenney Book 1 (2005) ISBN 978-0-385-51673-0
- The Abduction (aka Saving Grace) (2007) ISBN 978-1-59315-463-9
- The Perk (2008) ISBN 978-1-84744-071-6
- The Common Lawyer (2009) ISBN 978-1-84744-232-1
- Accused, A. Scott Fenney Book 2 (2010) ISBN 978-1-84744-275-8
- Con Law: John Bookman 1 (2013) ISBN 978-1-84744-379-3
- The Governor's Wife (2013) ISBN 978-0-7515-4376-6
- The Case Against William (2014) ISBN 978-0-7515-6727-4
- Parts & Labor: The Adventures of Max Dugan (2015) ISBN 978-1-3111-4767-7
- The Absence of Guilt, A. Scott Fenney Book 3 (2016) ISBN 978-0-7515-6729-8
- End of Days: Con Law II - John Bookman 2 (2017)
