= Thomas L. Shaffer =

American lawyer (1934–2019)

7th Dean of the Notre Dame Law School
- In office 1971–1975
- Preceded by: William B. Lawless Jr.
- Succeeded by: David T. Link

Personal details
- Born: April 4, 1934 Billings, Montana
- Died: February 26, 2019 (aged 84) South Bend, Indiana

Thomas Lindsay Shaffer (April 4, 1934 – February 26, 2019) was a lawyer, professor, legal ethics scholar, dean of the Notre Dame Law School, and the most prolific American legal author, having written over 300 scholarly works.

== Early life and education ==
Thomas L. Shaffer was born in 1934 in Billings, Montana, and grew up in Wyoming before attending Fruita Union High School in Colorado. He grew up and was baptized a Baptist, but then converted to Roman Catholicism. Shaffer served in the U.S. Air Force in the 1950s. He received his B.A. from the University of Albuquerque in 1958 and his J.D. from Notre Dame Law School in 1961, cum laude, and he was ranked first in his class and was chosen as editor-in-chief of the law review, the Notre Dame Lawyer. In 1983, he received an honorary LL.D. from St. Mary's University.

== Career ==
Before becoming a professor, Shaffer worked as an attorney with Barnes, Hickam, Pantzer & Boyd from 1961 to 1963 in Indianapolis. Starting in 1963 Shaffer began teaching estate planning at Notre Dame Law School, and then served as associate dean from 1969 to 1971 and as dean from 1971 to 1975. Between 1980 and 1988 Shaffer served as the Robert E.R. Huntley Professor of Law at Washington and Lee University School of Law and as the director of the school's Frances Lewis Law Center. In 1988 Shaffer returned to Notre Dame as a full professor and then focused on clinical ethical instruction through the Notre Dame Legal Aid Clinic serving the underprivileged in the South Bend area. Shaffer served as a visiting professor of law at U.C.L.A., University of Virginia, University of Maine, and Boston College Law School. He wrote nearly 300 works in various areas of the law including legal ethics, Christianity and the law, estate planning, mediation and other. He was a member of the Society of Christian Ethics, the Jewish Law Association, the AALS Executive Committee, and the ABA accreditation Committee, on the board of advisors of the Journal of Law and Ethics. The Thomas L. Shaffer Public Interest Fellowship at Notre Dame Law School is named in his honor.

== Professional Ethics and Philosophy ==
=== Lawyers, Clients, and Moral Responsibility ===
Thomas Shaffer argues that legal practice is a moral activity. He maintains that conversations in law offices are fundamentally moral conversations because legal decisions impact people. For Shaffer, legal representation is an opportunity for both lawyer and client to become better moral agents.

A central theme is Shaffer’s critique of the “lawyer as godfather” model. In this model, lawyers dominate decision-making for clients, focusing primarily on financial success and legal advantage while disregarding the moral consequences of actions on others. These lawyers act paternalistically, often treating clients as objects or children rather than autonomous persons. Shaffer argues that this paternalism ultimately restricts client freedom rather than enhancing it, leading clients toward selfish outcomes rather than moral choices.

Shaffer also criticizes the professional norm of non-accountability, the idea that lawyers are not morally responsible for the means they use or the ends they achieve when advocating for clients. He rejects the assumption that lawyers are morally superior to clients, noting that clients often possess strong moral values. Rather than being “occasions of sin,” clients frequently wrestle seriously with moral questions and may seek the lawyer’s help in doing so. True respect for client autonomy, in Shaffer’s view, includes helping clients make informed and thoughtful decisions about the kind of people they are becoming, not simply maximizing their legal freedom.

Instead, Shaffer promotes a model of lawyering grounded in mutual moral accountability. Lawyers should assist clients in making informed choices about how they exercise their freedom and about the kind of persons they are becoming. Drawing on Socratic ethics, Shaffer emphasizes moral character, collaboration, mercy, and restraint, including the justice that can arise from not asserting one’s rights.

== Major works ==
- Legal Interviewing and Counseling in a Nutshell
- On Being a Christian and a Lawyer (Brigham Young University Press, 1981)
- The Planning and Drafting of Wills and Trusts
- Lawyers, Clients, and Moral Responsibility
- Property Law: Cases, Materials and Problems
- American Lawyers and Their Communities, with Mary M. Shaffer (University of Notre Dame Press 1991)
- Lawyers, Law Students and People, with Robert S. Redmount (Shepard's, McGraw-Hill 1977)
