= Kip A. Petroff =

American lawyer

Kip A. Petroff is a Texas trial lawyer and is the founding partner of Petroff & Associates. His firm made its name handling plaintiffs' litigation, including representing clients suing blood banks for negligent screening of blood donors and suing the manufacturers of defective breast implants. However, he is best known for representing clients in lawsuits filed against American Home Products Corporation (later purchased by Wyeth) for heart valve injuries and other injuries arising from two diet drugs Wyeth marketed, Pondimin, and Redux (and the diet drug combination referred to as "Fen-Phen").

Mr. Petroff is also currently co-lead counsel with a group of law firms representing hundreds of Tarrant County, Texas homeowners against several natural gas companies in the Barnett Shale.

== Background and education ==
Petroff graduated from Notre Dame Law School in 1983. He is the founder and senior partner of the law firm Petroff & Associates, based in Dallas, Texas. Petroff is board certified by the Texas Board of Legal Specialization in both personal injury and civil trial law. He is licensed to practice before the Texas Supreme Court and the Eastern District of Texas. He is a member of the Texas Trial Lawyers Association, the Dallas Bar Association, and the American Association for Justice, and in 2009 was elected as a fellow of the Texas Bar Foundation.

== Recognition ==
In August 1999, the firm represented a plaintiff against American Home Products Corporation in the first case involving Fen-Phen to go to trial worldwide. A landmark case in Fen-Phen litigation, the jury returned a verdict for the plaintiff in excess of twenty three million dollars. {Twenty million dollars of this verdict was for punitive damages and three million three hundred thousand dollars was awarded for pain and suffering and medical expenses. The client's damages were for injury to her aortic and mitral heart valves. The client did not actually receive any money after the initial verdict. Due largely to the uncertainty of this verdict being upheld on appeal, the client settled her case on September 30, 1999, before a Judgment was entered on the verdict. On that date, the client settled her case for one million nine hundred ninety seven dollars plus Court Costs in the amount of eleven thousand four hundred eighty five dollars. Attorney's fees in the amount of seven hundred ninety eight thousand eight hundred dollars and litigation expenses in the amount of one hundred sixty five thousand eight hundred twenty nine dollars were withheld from the settlement.}

Petroff has been selected as a "Texas Super Lawyer" in 2003, 2004, 2005, 2008, 2009, 2010, and 2011. ("Super Lawyers" is a Thomson Reuters service).

== Personal life ==
Petroff lives in Dallas, Texas with his wife Suzi Zimmerman Petroff. He and Suzi are the founders of New Hope Foundation, a Dallas-based nonprofit dedicated to improving the living conditions of underprivileged families.
