= Heather A. Welch =

US judge

Judge, Superior Court of Marion County Indiana (elected 2006)
- In office January 1, 2007 – 2024

Senior Judge, Superior Court of Marion County Indiana, 2024

Personal details
- Education: Indiana University Bloomington, Kelley School of Business (B.S. 1989); Valparaiso University School of Law (J.D. 1994)

Heather A. Welch is a retired American judge who served on the Marion County, Indiana Superior Court, located in Indianapolis, Indiana. She was instrumental in developing Indiana's Commercial Courts, on which she served as one of its initial judges until her retirement. She has served as a judicial leader in Indiana and nationally, among other things being the incoming chair of the American Bar Association's Judicial Division in 2024, and has received numerous awards for her judicial service.

== Judicial service ==
Welch was elected as a judge to the Marion County Superior Court in 2006, and began serving on January 1, 2007. She served in the criminal division from 2007 to 2008, and in the civil division from 2009 to 2024. She retired in early 2024, but Indiana's Supreme Court certified her to sit as a senior judge after her retirement, through December 31, 2024. In 2016, she became the Marion Superior Court's first Commercial Court judge, and served on that specialized business court until her retirement. She was the presiding judge of the Marion Superior Court's Executive Committee from January 2019 to January 2021.

=== Prior service on the Superior Court ===
Before her election as a Superior Court judge, Welch served six years as a Magistrate Judge, in both civil and criminal matters.

=== Role in creating and serving on commercial court ===
In 2013, Indiana's Supreme Court initiated an effort to evaluate the idea of creating specialized commercial courts in the state. A Business Courts Subcommittee was assigned this task. Welch was one of the three people on that subcommittee (which also included Allen County Superior Court Judge Craig J. Bobay). After researching the concept, in 2014, Welch and Bobay formed a broader, informal, Commercial Courts Working Group (the working group) to advise the subcommittee. The working group and subcommittee ultimately urged creating a commercial court pilot project. In 2015, the Indiana Supreme Court formalized the working group. In 2016, Indiana's Supreme Court followed the committee's and working group's recommendations to create a pilot Commercial Court.

In 2016, Welch was one of the six original pilot Commercial Court judges. The working group tracked and studied the pilot program for three years, and after its reports and recommendations over that time, the Supreme Court made the Commercial Courts permanent in 2019. Welch was again one of six Indiana judges assigned to the Commercial Court in 2019, and continued as a Commercial Court judge until her retirement in 2024. The working group's role ended in 2019, but the Indiana Supreme Court immediately created a Commercial Court Committee as an adjunct to the permanent Commercial Courts. Welch has served as co-chair, with Bobay, on this permanent committee.

== Legal practice ==
Welch began her legal career in the Marion County Prosecutor’s office, moved to the Attorney General's office, and then went into private practice at a law firm, Kiefer & McGoff, before becoming a magistrate judge.

After her retirement as a judge, Welch joined the private alternative dispute resolution firm JAMS, where she provides services as a mediator, arbitrator, special master, neutral evaluator and hearing officer.

== Education ==
Welch received a B.S. degree for the Indiana University Bloomington Kelley School of Business in 1989, and Juris Doctor degree from Valparaiso University School of Law in 1994.

Since 2018, Welch has been an adjunct professor at Indiana University Robert H. McKinney School of Law, teaching legal communications and analysis

== Awards and honors ==
In 2023, the Indianapolis Bar Association gave her its Silver Gavel Award. "This annual award is to recognize exceptional, meritorious achievement by a judicial officer widely accepted by his or her peers as having consistently modeled the spirit of the Rules of Professional Conduct. The winner will also be viewed by the legal community as epitomizing the ideals of the Bench."

Among others, Welch has received the following awards and honors;

- The National Association of Women Judges Norma Wikler Excellence in Service Award (2023)
- The Antoinette Dakin Leach Award from the Indianapolis Bar Association (2019). This award was established by the Women and the Law Division of the Indianapolis Bar Association to honor outstanding women in the legal profession, and is only presented "when the Division deems a worthy candidate exists"
- The Indiana Bar Foundation's Award for Service to the Legal Profession and Community (2018). She was recognized "for service to the public and profession[,]" and was "described as a 'pillar' of the legal community, committed to the improvement of the judicial system".
- The Indiana State Bar Association presented her with its Outstanding Judge Award (2018)
- The Indiana Lawyer presented Welch with its Leadership in Law award (2012)
- The American Board of Trial Advocates' Indiana, Trial Judge of the Year award (2011)

== Positions ==
Among others, Welch has held the following positions;

- Chair, American Bar Association (ABA)'s Judicial Division (2024–25)
- Vice-president of the American College of Business Court Judges
- Elected member of the American Law Institute
- Co-chair of Indiana's Commercial Courts Committee, and a founder of Indiana's Commercial Courts Working Group
- President, Indiana Judges Association (2023–24)
- Chair the Annual Conference of the National Association of Women Judges (2023)
- Chair of the ABA's National Conference of State Trial Judges (2019–20)
- Business Court Representative to the ABA's Business Law Section (2018–19)
- Co-chair of the Business Courts Subcommittee of the Corporate and Litigation Committee of the ABA's Business Law Section (2021 to 2024)
- Co-chair of the Indemnification and Insurance Subcommittee of the Corporate and Litigation Committee of the ABA's Business Law Section (2019 to 2024)
- Co-chair of the American Bar Association's Judicial Clerkship Program (2016–).
