= Richard W. Garnett =

American lawyer (born 1968)

Richard W. Garnett (born November 6, 1968) is the Paul J. Schierl / Fort Howard Corporation Professor of Law, a Concurrent Professor of Political Science, and the founding director of the Notre Dame Program on Church, State & Society at Notre Dame Law School. He teaches in the areas of criminal law, constitutional law, First Amendment law, and the death penalty. He has contributed to research in such topics as school choice and Catholic social teaching. His articles have appeared in a variety of prominent law journals, including the Cornell Law Review, the Georgetown Law Journal, the Michigan Law Review, and the UCLA Law Review. He also regularly appears in The New York Times, USA Today, and The Wall Street Journal and as a guest on National Public Radio.

== Education and experience ==
Raised in Alaska, Garnett majored in philosophy at Duke University. In 1995, he earned his J.D. from Yale Law School. He clerked for Judge Richard Sheppard Arnold on the U.S. Court of Appeals for the Eighth Circuit, then for Chief Justice William H. Rehnquist on the United States Supreme Court. He practiced for two years at Miller, Cassidy, Larroca & Lewin in Washington, D.C.

== Personal life ==
He is married to Nicole Stelle Garnett, a professor at the University of Notre Dame Law School. The couple met while students at Yale Law School.

== See also ==
- List of law clerks for the chief justice of the United States
