= Graciela Olivarez =

American lawyer (1928–1987)

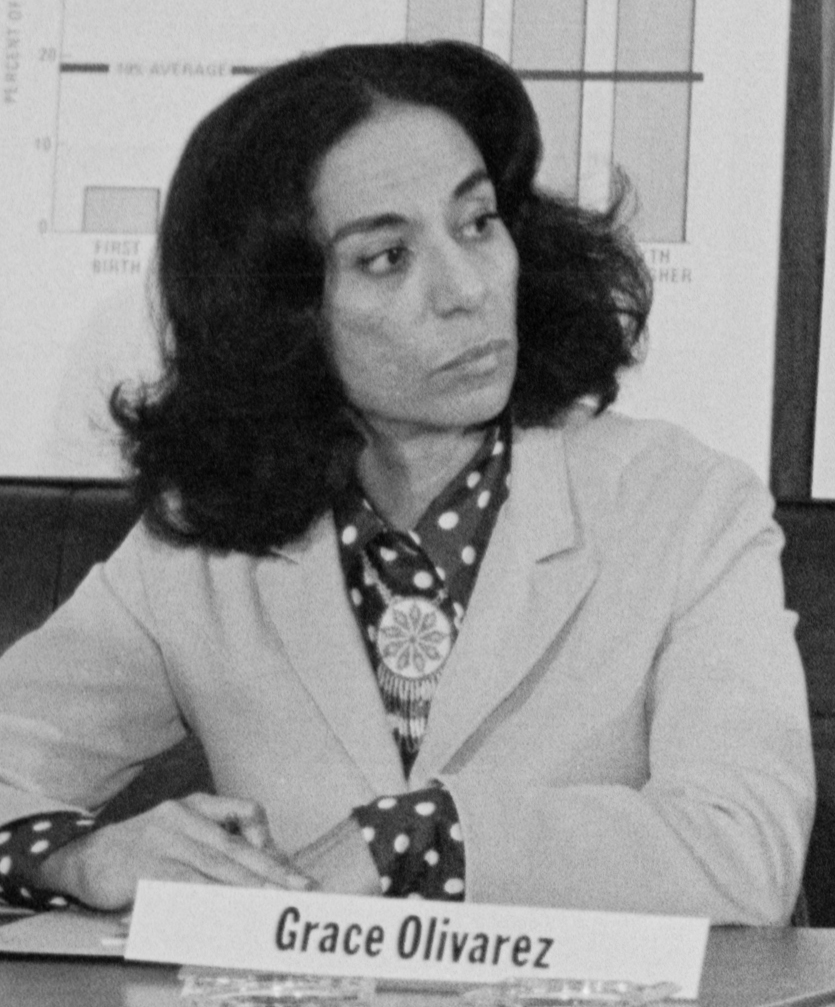
- Olivárez in 1971

10th Director of the Office of Economic Opportunity
- In office January 1977 – 1980
- President: Jimmy Carter
- Preceded by: Samuel Martinez
- Succeeded by: Office abolished

Personal details
- Born: March 9, 1928 Albuquerque, New Mexico, U.S.
- Died: September 19, 1987 (aged 59) Albuquerque, New Mexico, U.S.
- Spouse: Alfred Olivarez (divorced)
- Children: 1
- Education: Notre Dame Law School
- Occupation: Lawyer

Graciela Gil Olivárez (March 9, 1928 – September 19, 1987) was an American lawyer and activist. She served as director of the Office of Economic Opportunity from 1977 to 1980.

== Early life and education ==
Olivárez was born in Albuquerque. She had three sisters and a brother. When Olivárez's family moved to Phoenix, Arizona in 1944, she dropped out of high school and then proceeded to hold a position at a women's program director of KIFN, a Spanish-language radio station in 1952.

Despite not completing high school or attending college, University of Notre Dame president Theodore Hesburgh made arrangements for her to attend the university's law school. In 1970, Olivárez became the first woman and the first Latina to graduate from Notre Dame Law School.

== Career ==
She served as Director of the Arizona branch of the federal Office of Economic Opportunity from 1966 to 1967, during which she was offered a scholarship to the school. The Notre Dame Hispanic Law Students Association presents an award in her name annually.

In 1971, Olivárez was elected to the Common Cause National Governing Board.

By 1972, Olivárez had been appointed the director of the University of New Mexico's Institute for Social Research and Development. From 1973 to 1975 she was a professor at the law school and later became New Mexico's State Planning Officer under governor Jerry Apodaca in 1975.

Olivarez served as the chair of the Mexican American Legal Defense and Education Fund, and was one of the first two women on its board.

In 1977, President Jimmy Carter appointed her the director of the Office of Economic Opportunity after she had caught Jimmy Carter's attention with her efforts to decrease poverty. She thus became the highest-ranking Hispanic woman in the Carter administration.

In 1980 Olivárez left the Carter administration to run her own business, Olivárez television Company, Incorporated that was the first Spanish-language TV network. By 1984, she was the owner of a management consulting/public relations firm in Albuquerque.

== Personal life and death ==
Graciela Olivárez would marry and later divorce Alfred Olivárez. Her son Victor Olivarez became a naval lieutenant.

She would die from cancer in Albuquerque on September 19, 1987.
