= William K. Kelley =

American law professor

William K. Kelley served as Deputy Counsel to United States President George W. Bush. He worked as a deputy to White House Counsel Harriet Miers prior to her departure from the White House, and Counsel Fred Fielding, who succeeded Miers.

Kelley is a professor at the University of Notre Dame Law School who took a leave of absence to work at the White House. He returned to Notre Dame in the 2007–2008 academic year. He earned his B.A. from Marquette University in 1984 and his J.D. from Harvard in 1987. He is a member of Phi Beta Kappa. Admitted to the Ohio Bar in 1990, Professor Kelley clerked for Kenneth W. Starr on the U.S. Court of Appeals for the District of Columbia Circuit in Washington, D.C. (1987–88), as well as for Chief Justice Warren E. Burger and Associate Justice Antonin Scalia (1988–89).

Kelley worked with the Office of the Special Counsel when Kenneth Starr was investigating the Whitewater / Monica Lewinsky incidents, writing the brief for the case. During the Florida election recount, Kelley was a member of the so-called Cabal, a group of former law clerks to conservative Supreme Court justices. The clerks argued the Supreme Court justices would want to grant certiorari to hear the controversy that would become, Bush v. Gore.

== United States attorneys ==
Kelley was one of several Bush administration White House staff members that participated in approving the dismissal of eight United States Attorneys in 2006. Questions about the criteria for the dismissals led to Congressional hearings. On March 21, 2007, the House Committee on the Judiciary, Subcommittee on Commercial and Administrative Law, approved issuing subpoenas to Kelley, along with four other senior White house officials, to testify about the dismissals.

== See also ==
- List of law clerks for the chief justice of the United States
- List of law clerks for the ninth seat of the Supreme Court of the United States
