= Jack Sandner =

American businessman (1941–2021)

John Francis Sandner (November 3, 1941 – March 11, 2021) was an American business executive and community leader. He served three stints as the chairman of the Chicago Mercantile Exchange (CME), now the CME Group, in the 1980s and 1990s.

== Early life ==
Sandner was born in South Side, Chicago, on November 3, 1941. His family, who were Irish American, were of a modest background and resided in a three-room apartment. His father worked as a shoe salesman, while his mother was employed at a variety store. Sandner attended Chicago Vocational High School for one year before dropping out. He consequently took up boxing under the guidance of Tony Zale. He finished his amateur career with a 58–2 record and a Golden Gloves title. He ultimately went back to school at Leo Catholic High School, graduating as class valedictorian.

Sandner was awarded a scholarship to study psychology at Southern Illinois University, earning a Bachelor of Arts from that institution. He went on to obtain a Juris Doctor from the University of Notre Dame. There, he received the law school's Dean's Award and won the three-year Appellate Advocacy competition. He earned a fellowship to the Law Science Academy, where he won the Dr. Ruth Jackson Award, graduating with high honors. Sandner was called to the Illinois Bar in 1968 and was subsequently admitted to several courts, including the United States Supreme Court.

== Business career ==
Sandner borrowed $80,000 to purchase a seat on the Chicago Mercantile Exchange (CME) in 1971. He traded during his lunch breaks and performed respectably so that he became a member and full-time trader at the Exchange four years later. He consequently established his own trading firm, and was elected to the board of the CME in 1977. He went on to become its chairman in 1980, becoming the youngest ever elected to the position and the first to serve multiple terms.

Sandner served as chairman throughout the 1980s and 1990s. During his tenure, exchanges in Chicago were blamed for aggravating the stock market crash in 1987, a claim which Sandner dismissed during his testimony before Congress. Moreover, 46 CME and Chicago Board of Trade traders were charged with racketeering, fraud, and lying to undercover federal agents in the late 1980s. Although he contended that more corruption existed at a hot dog stand, he conceded that "it was a real, real bad period". Both he and Leo Melamed were credited with bringing the Exchange up to date by developing an initial version of electronic trading. Sandner ended up becoming the longest elected exchange chairman in the history of the futures industry. He stepped down from the role in 1997 due to term limits. That same year, he unveiled a proposal that would permit traders to send orders for futures contracts via the internet directly to the trading floor.

Upon his retirement as chairman, Sandner was elected special policy advisor to the CME board of directors. He also served as chairman of the CME Foundation. He was a member of the team that took the CME public on December 6, 2002, making it the first exchange in the United States to be publicly traded. Sandner played a significant role in the acquisitions of the Chicago Board of Trade in 2007, and the New York Mercantile Exchange the following year. He also served on the board of the Dubai Mercantile Exchange.

=== Public service and community involvement ===
Sandner testified frequently before Congress as an industry leader, most notably the 1980 Gold and Silver Crisis, the 1987 stock market crash, and in the 1990s the modernization of financial services regulation. Bill Clinton invited Sandner to address his economic summit in Little Rock in December 1992. Three years later, U.S. Treasury Secretary Robert E. Rubin appointed him to the U.S. Advisory Commission on Financial Services. He was asked in 1997 to be the U.S. Chair for Financial Services at the Trans-Atlantic Business Dialogue Conference in Rome. Clinton later appointed Sandner to the President's Export Council in 1999, the premier National Advisory Council advising the President on International Trade. Sandner was appointed in 2001 by Congress to serve on the Library of Congress National Digital Strategy Advisory Board (NDSAB) to develop a national digital strategy for the preservation, management and distribution of the government's digital materials and information.

Sandner was a trustee of the University of Notre Dame, Rush University Medical Center, the Museum of Science and Industry of Chicago, and the John G. Shedd Aquarium. It was in this capacity at Notre Dame that he persuaded the school to establish a program for individuals with special needs. He was chairman of the Cancer Institute at Rush University Medical Center, and served on the boards of the National Futures Association, the Civic Committee of the Commercial Club of Chicago, Ryan Specialty Group, and Virtu Financial LLC. He was also a member of the Economic Club of Chicago and the Executive Club of Chicago.

== Honors and recognition ==
Sandner was conferred the Points of Light Award from President George H. W. Bush, the Horatio Alger Award (1998), the “Living Proof Award” from Rush University Children's Hospital Neurobehavioral Center and was named Man of the Year by the Juvenile Diabetes Foundation. He was also inducted into the Italian-American Sports Hall of Fame in 1995, and honored by the Brazilian-American Chamber of Commerce as Person of the Year in 1996. Sandner was bestowed the National Wrestling Hall of Fame Outstanding American Award in the fall of 2008.

Sandner was awarded an honorary doctorate of law from the University of Notre Dame on May 21, 2006. He was honored with an endowed chair "Chicago Mercantile Exchange John F. Sandner in Futures and Options Studies" at Northwestern University J.L. Kellogg Graduate School of Management. He was awarded an honorary Doctor of Humane Letters by Roosevelt University and Lincoln College (Illinois).

== Personal life ==
Sandner met his wife, Carole, while studying at Notre Dame. She worked as a nurse at a hospital in South Bend, Indiana. They were married for 51 years until his death. Together, they adopted eight children.

Sandner resided in Lake Bluff, Illinois, during his later years. He died on March 11, 2021, at Northwestern Memorial Hospital in Chicago. He was 79, and suffered a stroke prior to his death.
