= Antoinette Dakin Leach =

American lawyer (1859–1922)

- Born: April 3, 1859; Wooster, Ohio
- Died: June 11, 1922 (aged 63); Oxford, New York
- Education: Ohio Wesleyan University
- Occupation: Lawyer

Antoinette Dakin Leach (April 3, 1859 – June 11, 1922) was an American lawyer and a women's rights pioneer who was an active organizer on behalf of women's suffrage in Indiana. When the Greene-Sullivan Circuit Court denied Leach's petition for admission to the bar in 1893, her successful appeal to the Indiana Supreme Court, In re Petition of Leach, broke the gender barrier for admission to the bar in Indiana, securing the right for women to practice law in the state. The landmark decision, a progressive one for the time, also set a precedent that was used in 1897 as a test case to give Indiana women the right to vote, although the voting rights challenge in Gougar v Timberlake was unsuccessful. Leach was also an active politician and a supporter of women's suffrage who favored a constitutional amendment to secure women's right to vote.

The Wooster, Ohio, native and married mother of two was trained as a lawyer and stenographer. She began her legal career as court reporter for the Greene-Sullivan Circuit Court in Sullivan, Indiana. After Leach was admitted to the bar in 1883, she maintained a general law practice in Sullivan and in Indianapolis, Indiana, from 1911 until her retirement in 1917. Leach also held several leadership roles in local and state politics, including membership in the Republican Party and serving as a delegate to the party's state convention in 1896, before joining the Progressive Party when it endorsed equal suffrage. Leach served for three years as Sullivan County chair of Progressive Party and for twelve years as president of the Sullivan County Bar Association. She was admitted to Indiana State Bar Association in 1909. Leach served as a State Organizer for the National American Suffrage Association and ran an active but unsuccessful campaign for state representative in 1910. In addition, she founded the Woman Citizen, a monthly publication of Indiana's Equal Suffrage Association, in 1911 and served as its editor for two years. Two plaques in the rotunda of the Sullivan County Courthouse commemorate Leach's life and her successful effort to secure women the right to practice law in Indiana.

== Early life and education ==
Antoinette was born on April 3, 1859, in Wooster, Ohio, to Lydia and Henry Daken, Her father died when she was only a few months old. Lydia Dakin later married a carpenter named Brighton and the family moved to Gosport in Owen County, Indiana.

Dakin's stepfather adopted her as a child and she was known as Nettie Brighton until her marriage. In 1871 the Brightons moved to Sullivan County, Indiana, where young Nettie attended common school in Sullivan, Indiana, and was raised by her mother after the death of her stepfather. Brighton also attended Ascension Academy, at least through 1875, when she was hired to teach school in Sullivan. In 1878, after two years of teaching, she enrolled at Ohio Wesleyan University in Delaware, Ohio, but left school to marry and did not earn a degree there.

== Marriage and family ==
Antoinette Dakin married George W. Leach, a Sullivan businessman, when she was aged twenty and still a student attending Ohio Wesleyan. Prior to their marriage the couple made an agreement, unusual for the time, that gave Antoinette the choice to pursue educational and vocational opportunities of her choice. The couple resided in Sullivan, where George had interests in several businesses and was also a landowner. He fell ill with Bright's Disease in 1917 and died on December 27, 1919, at the age of seventy-one.

Antoinette and George Leach had two children. Their daughter, Hortense Eugenia, was born on February 1, 1880; she later married Milton S. Sheplar and moved to New York. Their son, George W. Leach Jr., was born on December 22, 1882, and later resided in New York City. Lydia Dakin Brighton, Antoinette's mother, also lived in the Leach family's home.

== Legal training ==
In 1884, after the birth of her two children, Leach left her home and children in Sullivan, Indiana, under the care of her husband and mother to attend a law school in Knoxville, Tennessee. Leach received a law degree in 1884 and continued her legal training as a student of the Sprague Correspondence School of Law of Detroit, Michigan, in 1887.

== Career ==
=== Early years ===
Although Leach began work as a teacher, she began studying stenography around the time of her marriage and became court reporter for the Greene-Sullivan Circuit Court. Leach introduced stenography to the court and taught the subject in her school, which was located near the county courthouse in Sullivan. After completing her legal training Leach continued to work as a court reporter and as the bookkeeper for her husband's business in Sullivan, in addition to work at a local law firm. Leach worked in the law office of John S. Bays for six years and as a court reporter for the Greene-Sullivan Circuit Court until 1893.

Leach applied for admission to the Greene County, Indiana, bar on February 14, 1893, in a petition submitted by John Bays, her employer. Although Leach had graduated from law school, had experience as a court reporter, and four members of the Sullivan County bar supported her petition, Greene-Sullivan Circuit Court Judge John C. Briggs, for whom Leach served as a court reporter for six years, denied her petition for admission to the bar. Judge Briggs blocked her from practicing law on the basis that Article 7, Section 21, of the Indiana Constitution and an 1881 state statue described those eligible for admission to the bar had to be a voter, among other qualifications. The judge ruled that Leach did not meet all the qualifications because she was not a voter (women had not yet been granted suffrage in Indiana at that time) and denied her petition to be admitted to the bar. Bays, Leach's attorney, appealed the decision to the Indiana Supreme Court on her behalf.

=== In re Petition of Leach ===
In re Petition of Leach, 134 Ind. 665 (1893), the Indiana Supreme Court handed down its decision in a written opinion on June 14, 1893, with Leach winning the appeal of her case. The Indiana Supreme Court reversed the trial court's ruling and ordered that she be admitted to the bar.

Justice Leonard J. Hackney, writing on behalf of the court, explained that the Indiana Constitution should not be interpreted as disqualifying nonvoters from becoming lawyers and that women who met all the other qualifications, as Leach did, had the right to practice law. According to the court's ruling, eligibility was intended to include voters, but not to deliberately exclude women. Justice Hackney "maintained that women had the same 'right to a choice of vocations' as men did." He also remarked in the court's decision: "If nature has endowed woman with wisdom, if our colleges have given her education, if her energy and diligence have led her to a knowledge of the law, and if her ambition directs her to adopt the profession, shall it be said that forgotten fictions must bar the door against her?" The decision was unanimous in Leach's favor, but it met with some resistance and surprised some of the attorneys in the state.

The significance of Leach's landmark case was that it legally established women's right to become lawyers in Indiana. The Indiana decision was a progressive one for the time; other state supreme courts, such as Illinois, had denied similar petitions from other women. However, the Indiana Supreme Court's ruling did not make Leach the first woman in Indiana to practice law as some sources have claimed. The Vigo County Circuit Court admitted Elizabeth "Bessie" Jane Eaglesfield of Terre Haute, Indiana, on September 8, 1875, and CeDora of Danville, Indiana, was admitted to the Hendricks County Circuit Court in 1886.

Leach's landmark victory set a legal precedent that was used in 1897 as a test case to give Indiana women the right to vote; however, this challenge to the state constitution proved to be unsuccessful when Lafayette, Indiana, lawyer Helen M. Gougar brought suit against the Tippecanoe County, Indiana, elections board after it refused to allow her to vote in the November 1894 elections. In Gougar v Timberlake (1897) Gougar appealed the Tippecanoe County Superior Court's decision in favor of the election board to the Indiana Supreme Court. Gougar argued on her own behalf that voting was natural right for men and women, asserting that the Fourteenth Amendment to the U.S. Constitution assured her that right, regardless of the text in Article 2, section 2, of Indiana's state constitution, which limited the franchise to males aged twenty-one and older. Justice Hackney, again writing on behalf of the Indiana Supreme Court, denied Gougar's appeal. He explained that the Court considered voting a political right, not a natural right, as was the ruling in Leach's case, and stated that the state constitution specifically provided voting rights to its male citizens.

=== Law practice ===
After winning her landmark Indiana Supreme Court case, Leach was sworn in as a member of the Sullivan County bar on October 10, 1893. On June 21, 1894, she was admitted to practice before the Indiana Supreme Court. Leach was admitted to the Indiana State Bar Association in 1909.

Leach maintained a general law practice in Sullivan for many years, and from 1911 to 1917 she was a partner in the law firm of Enslow and Leach in Indianapolis. Leach also served twelve years as president of the Sullivan County Bar Association.

=== Women's suffrage advocate and politician ===
Leach was initially a member of the Republican Party, serving as a delegate to the party's state convention in 1896, but joined the Progressive Party when it endorsed equal suffrage. Beginning in 1912 Leach served for three years as Sullivan County's chair of the Progressive Party.

Leach was an active organizer on behalf of women's suffrage, and formed the first "effective suffrage club in Sullivan." In 1910 she became state organizer for the National American Suffrage Association and ran for state representative on the Equal Suffrage Party's ticket, receiving ten votes in the November election. As a strong supporter of women's suffrage, Leach was also an ally of Susan B. Anthony. Alva Belmont, president of the National American Woman Suffrage Association, described Leach as "the most capable advocate of the equal suffrage movement since Susan B. Anthony." Leach also founded the Woman Citizen, a monthly publication of Indiana's Equal Suffrage Association, in 1911 and served as its editor for two years.

In February 1911 Leach spoke before the Indiana General Assembly in favor of amending the state constitution to grant women the right to vote. In a resolution she wrote to amend the state constitution in 1911, Leach proposed that the word "male" be removed from the voting qualifications. After the resolution passed the Indiana House of Representatives, the Indiana Senate shelved it after a third reading due to Indiana governor Thomas R. Marshall's proposed plan for a new state constitution.

=== Businesswoman ===
Leach and her husband were involved in local businesses, including a department store called the Golden Rule in Sullivan that she also managed. The store opened around 1906 or 1907, but the venture was unsuccessful and closed within a few years. The Leaches suffered from other business reversals, including her husband's prosecution and conviction for illegal sales of liquor in 1911.

== Later years ==
Ill health forced Leach to retirement from practicing law in 1917. Following her retirement and her husband's death in 1919, Leach moved to New York to be closer to her children and grandchildren.

== Death and legacy ==
Antoinette Dakin Leach died at her daughter's home at Oxford, New York, on June 11, 1922, at the age of sixty-three, two years after Indiana women won the right to vote.

Leach's longtime commitment to the battle for equality, which continued for more than seven decades, her active involvement with the women's suffrage movement, and several leadership roles in local and state politics culminated in successful efforts to attain enfranchisement for women only a few years prior to her death.

Most significant is Leach's appeal to the Indiana Supreme Court in 1893. The landmark case broke the gender barrier for admission to the bar in Indiana, securing the women's right to practice law in the state. She is also credited with introducing new technology such as the use of stenography and typewritten documents into the practice of law. Her petition to the Indiana Supreme Court is believed to be one of the first typewritten document submitted to that court.

== Honors and awards ==
A plaque was erected in 1937 in the rotunda of the Sullivan County Courthouse to honor Leach. In 1993 another tablet was placed in the Sullivan County Courthouse's rotunda to commemorate the centennial of her successful effort to secure women the right to practice law in Indiana.

Each year the Indianapolis Bar Association names one of the state's women lawyers as the recipient of the Antoinette Dakin Leach Award.

== See also ==
  - List of first women lawyers and judges in Indiana
