= William J. Hoynes =

First dean of Notre Dame Law School

William James Hoynes (1846 – 1933) was an Irish-American professor and academic who was the dean of the law department at the University of Notre Dame. He was also a veteran of the American Civil War, newspaper editor, lawyer, and was "famed as a philosopher, legal writer, linguist and … raconteur [who could] tell war stories or lecture a class in law, in Latin, Greek, Hebrew and half the modern languages in Europe with amazing facility."

== Early life and education ==
William Hoynes was born near Callan, County Kilkenny, Ireland on November 8, 1846 to Patrick Hoynes, a laborer, and Catherine Kennedy Hoynes. In 1853 the family emigrated to the United States, and in 1855 they settled in La Crosse, Wisconsin. Shortly thereafter, William began training as a typesetter on the La Crosse Republican newspaper.

== Military service ==
At the age of 15, Hoynes enlisted as a private in Company A of the 20th Wisconsin Volunteer Infantry Regiment during the American Civil War under the command of his friend Augustus Herman Pettibone. He was wounded during the Battle of Prairie Grove, Arkansas while charging on the Confederate position. He was made captive, but managed to escape in the confusion. While his wound was still healing, he participated in the battle of Van Buren and the siege of Vicksburg. Due to his wounds, he was discharged in November 1863. Upon returning home, he found his father to have died and soon later his brother also passed. He then re-enlisted in Company D of the 2nd Regiment Wisconsin Volunteer Cavalry in February 1864 and remained with that unit through the remainder of the war.

Hoynes remained a military enthusiast throughout his life. In October 1885 Notre Dame organized its military company under the name of the "Hoynes Light Guards," with Hoynes as its commander, or "Colonel." Hoynes was thereafter referred to as "Colonel" Hoynes, despite the fact that the highest rank he held in the U.S. Army was Private.

== Newspaper work ==
After the war he returned to the printing office and was able to work and save enough money in three years to provide for his widowed mother and siblings. In 1868 he enrolled briefly at Notre Dame. He completed a Bachelor of Laws (LL.B.) degree at the University of Michigan in 1872.

Hoynes practiced law occasionally following his graduation from Michigan in 1872, but focused most of his work in the newspaper business for a decade. From 1872 to 1874 he served as an associate editor of the New Brunswick (NJ)Times, and from 1875 to 1879 he served as chief of staff of Pomeroy's Democrat (Chicago) and associate editor of Pomeroy's Great West (Denver). While serving as an associate of controversial publisher Marcus M. "Brick" Pomeroy in 1877, Hoynes received an honorary Master of Arts (A.M.) degree from Notre Dame. From 1880 to 1882 he served as editor of the Peoria, Illinois Daily Transcript. In 1882 he opened a law firm in Chicago.

== Notre Dame ==
In January 1883 Hoynes joined Notre Dame as professor of law and by 1891 he had been appointed dean. While the Law Department had been established in 1869, at the time Hoynes joined "[t]here was no law room, no law library, not even a single law book." During his tenure the course of study was increased from two years to four years and the number of graduates increased from 3–5 per year to 10–15 per year.

Hoynes was on a leave of absence in 1908–09, during which time he was succeeded as dean by Timothy E. Howard. In 1915 Hoynes accepted emeritus status and was succeeded by Francis Vurpillat as dean. In 1919 the University dedicated "Hoynes College of Law" (previously Chemistry Hall). The building was renamed "Crowley Hall" in 1976. In 1926, the school institute the Hoynes Award in his honor, and was first presented at a "Hoynes night" celebration thrown in his honor.

== Public life and honors ==
Hoynes received an honorary Doctor of Laws (LL.D.) degree from Notre Dame in 1888. That same year he was the Republican Party candidate for Congress in the Indiana's 13th congressional district, narrowly losing to the incumbent, Democrat Benjamin F. Shively. In 1890 President Harrison appointed Hoynes to serve as chairman of the commission to negotiate with the Turtle Mountain Band of Chippewa Indians regarding their relocation. In 1912 Hoynes was made a Knight of St. Gregory by Pope Pius X in recognition of his work for Notre Dame.

=== Honors ===
- – Knight of the Equestrian Order of St. Gregory the Great (1921)

== Death and burial ==
Hoynes died in South Bend, Indiana on March 28, 1933, at the age of 87. He is buried in the Catholic Cemetery of La Crosse, Wisconsin.
