= Maxine E. Ryer Miller =

First woman to study law at the University of Notre Dame and gain admission to the bar

- Born: December 1, 1899; South Bend, Indiana, US
- Died: June 12, 1930 (aged 30); South Bend, Indiana, US
- Education: University of Notre Dame

Maxine Evelyn Ryer (December 1, 1899 – June 12, 1930) was the first woman to study law at the University of Notre Dame and the first woman to practice law in St. Joseph County, Indiana.

== Early life ==
M.E. Ryer was born in South Bend, Indiana on December 1, 1899, to Lester F. Ryer and Violet Pearl (Hartman) Ryer. She had one sibling, Bernice Ryer Collmer. Throughout her life she was referred to alternately as “Maxine” and “Evelyn.”

Ryer graduated from South Bend High School in 1916, where she was active in dramatic arts and performed in the initial play given at “the first Little Theater ever opened by a high school in America.” She subsequently attended Nazareth Academy in Kalamazoo, Michigan to study violin and drama. By 1920 she was offering violin lessons to pupils in South Bend.

== Law studies and bar admission ==
Ryer enrolled in 1921 as the first female law student at the University of Notre Dame. She also began serving as a clerk in the law office of former South Bend City Attorney Frank H. Dunnahoo.

On September 12, 1922, Ryer passed an examination and became the first woman admitted to the St. Joseph County (Indiana) bar for active practice in court. Bar examinations in Indiana were conducted on a local, rather than state-wide, basis until 1931. Three women had previously been admitted to the local bar, but did not practice law. In April 1923 she was admitted to practice before the federal courts and Supreme Court of the State of Indiana. She is not included in the Student Directory at Notre Dame in 1922–23 and does not appear to have received a degree from the university.

== Personal life and death ==
Ryer married Everett Miller in St. Joseph, Berrien County, Michigan on May 25, 1925. She died on June 12, 1930, in South Bend, Indiana, of heart disease. She did not have any children.
