= List of law clerks for the chief justice of the United States =

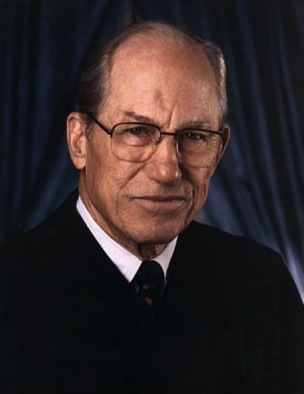
Byron White, 83rd associate justice of the U.S. Supreme Court, clerked for Chief Justice Fred Vinson during the 1946 term.

Law clerks have assisted the justices of the United States Supreme Court in various capacities since the first one was hired by Justice Horace Gray in 1882. Each justice is permitted to have between three and four law clerks per Court term. The chief justice is allowed to have five law clerks per Term, but no chief justice has ever done so regularly. Most persons serving in this capacity are recent law school graduates (and typically graduated at the top of their class). Among their many functions, clerks do legal research that assists justices in deciding what cases to accept and what questions to ask during oral arguments, prepare memoranda, and draft orders and opinions. After retiring from the Court, a justice may continue to employ a law clerk, who may be assigned to provide additional assistance to an active justice or may assist the retired justice when sitting by designation with a lower court.

== Table of law clerks ==
The following is a table of law clerks serving the chief justice, a position alluded to in the U.S. Constitution and established on September 24, 1789 by the 1st Congress through the Judiciary Act of 1789 (1 Stat. 73). The current Chief Justice of the United States is John Roberts.

Chief justices and law clerks

Morrison Waite

March 4, 1874 –
March 23, 1888

Clerk	Started	Finished	School (year)	Previous clerkship

Melville Fuller

October 8, 1888 –
July 4, 1910

Clerk	Started	Finished	School (year)	Previous clerkship
Thomas H. Fitnam	1888	1889	Georgetown (1884)	
James S. Harlan	1888	1889	admitted to bar, 1886	none
Clarence M. York	1890	1896	National University Law School (1889)	none
Clarence M. York	1897	1905	National University Law School (1889)	S. Field / M. W. Fuller
Stephen Albion Day	1905	1907	Michigan (did not graduate; admitted to bar, 1907)	W. Day

Edward Douglass White

December 19, 1910 –
May 19, 1921

Clerk	Started	Finished	School (year)	Previous clerkship
John J. Byrne	1918	1921	Georgetown (1909–10)	

William Howard Taft

July 11, 1921 –
February 3, 1930

Clerk	Started	Finished	School (year)	Previous clerkship
John J. Byrne	1921	1924	Georgetown (1909–10)	E. White
Wendell Mischler	1921	1930	Ripley (OH) High School (1885)	
C. Dickerman Williams	1924	1925	Yale (1924)	none
Reynolds Robertson	1929	1930	GW (1932)	S. Ct. Clerk's Office, Assistant Clerk (1922–29)

Charles Evans Hughes

February 24, 1930 –
June 30, 1941

Clerk	Started	Finished	School (year)	Previous clerkship
Wendell Mischler	1930	1930	Ripley (OH) High School (1885)	Taft
Reynolds Robertson	1930	1934	GW (1932)	Taft
Francis R. Kirkham	1934	1935	GW (1931)	Sutherland
Richard W. Hogue, Jr.	1938	1939	Penn (1930)	Sutherland
Edwin McElwain	1938	1941	Harvard (1934)	

Harlan F. Stone

July 3, 1941 –
April 22, 1946

Clerk	Started	Finished	School (year)	Previous clerkship
Bennett Boskey	1941	1943	Harvard (1939)	S. F. Reed / L. Hand (2d Cir.)
Carl Roger Nelson	1941	1942	Columbia (1941)	
James Lord Morrison	1942	1943	Columbia (1941)	
Eugene H. Nickerson	1944	April 1946	Columbia (1943)	A. Hand (2d Cir.)
Herbert Prashker	1945	April 1946	Columbia (1943)	I. Lehman (NY COA)

Fred M. Vinson

June 24, 1946 –
September 8, 1953

Clerk	Started	Finished	School (year)	Previous clerkship
Francis A. Allen	1946	1948	Northwestern (1946)	none
Byron R. White	1946	1947	Yale (1946)	none
Karl R. Price	1947	1948	Yale (1940)	C. Clark (2d Cir.)
Lawrence F. Ebb	1947	1948	Harvard (1946)	A. Hand (2d Cir.)
David E. Feller	1947	1949	Harvard (1941)	
Isaac N. ("Ike") Groner	1948	1949	Yale (1948)	
Arthur R. Seder, Jr.	1948	1950	Northwestern (1947)	none
Murray L. Schwartz	1949	1951	Penn (1949)	
Howard J. Trienens	1950	1952	Northwestern (1949)	none
Dan Walker	1950	1951	Northwestern (1950)	none
Newton N. Minow	1951	1952	Northwestern (1950)	none
James C.N. Paul	1951	1953	Penn (1951)	none
Carl S. Hawkins	1952	1953	Northwestern (1950)	none
William W. Oliver	1952	1953	Northwestern (1949)	none
Earl E. Pollock	1953	1953	Northwestern (1953)	none

Earl Warren

October 5, 1953 –
June 23, 1969

Clerk	Started	Finished	School (year)	Previous clerkship
Richard J. Flynn	1953	1954	Northwestern (1953)	
William W. Oliver	1953	1954	Northwestern (1949)	Vinson
Earl E. Pollock	1953	1955	Northwestern (1953)	Vinson
Gerald Gunther	1954	1955	Harvard (1953)	L. Hand (2d Cir.)
Payson R. Wolff	1954	1955	Yale (1954)	none
Jerome A. Cohen	1955	1956	Yale (1955)	none
Graham Blair Moody	1955	1956	Berkeley (1955)	
Samuel A. Stern	1955	1956	Harvard (1952)	Magruder (1st Cir.)
Martin F. Richman	1955	1957	Harvard (1953)	Magruder (1st Cir.)
William H. Allen	1956	1957	Stanford (1956)	none
Curtis R. Reitz	1956	1957	Penn (1956)	none
Jon O. Newman	1957	1958	Yale (1956)	G. T. Washington (D.C. Cir.)
Dallin H. Oaks	1957	1958	Chicago (1957)	none
Donald M. Cahen	1957	1958	Berkeley (1957)	none
Marc A. Franklin	1958	1959	Cornell (1956)	Hincks (2d Cir.)
Ira Michael Heyman	1958	1959	Yale (1956)	C. E. Clark (2d Cir.)
Robert J. Hoerner	1958	1959	Michigan (1958)	
Murray H. Bring	1959	1961	NYU (1959)	
William H. Dempsey	1959	1960	Yale (1955)	Fahy (D.C. Cir.)
Ralph J. Moore, Jr.	1959	1960	Berkeley (1959)	none
Arthur I. Rosett	1959	1960	Columbia (1959)	none
R. Markham Ball (shared with Reed and Burton)	1960	1961	Harvard (1960)	none
Jesse H. Choper	1960	1961	Penn (1960)	none
Joseph W. Bartlett	1960	1961	Stanford (1960)	none
Peter D. Ehrenhaft	1961	1962	Columbia (1957)	
R. Gordon Gooch	1961	1962	Texas (1957)	
Henry J. Steinman, Jr.	1961	1962	UCLA (1961)	
James N. Adler (shared with Whittaker)	1961	1962	Michigan (1961)	
Timothy B. Dyk	1962	1963	Harvard (1961)	S. F. Reed / Burton
John D. Niles	1962	1963	Berkeley (1962)	
Peter R. Taft	1962	1963	Yale (1961)	Rives (5th Cir.)
Stuart R. Pollak	1962	1963	Harvard (1962)	
Francis X. Beytagh	1963	1964	Michigan (1963)	none
Theodore R. Boehm (shared with Reed and Burton)	1963	1964	Harvard (1963)	none
James K. Hoenig	1963	1964	Stanford (1963)	none
Peter W. Low	1963	1964	Virginia (1963)	none
John Hart Ely	1964	1965	Yale (1963)	none
James C. Gaither	1964	1965	Stanford (1964)	none
Dennis M. Flannery	1964	1965	Penn (1964)	none
George C. Cochran (shared with Reed)	1964	1965	North Carolina (1964)	none
James T. Hale	1965	1966	Minnesota (1965)	none
Michael E. Smith	1965	1966	Michigan (1964)	Waterman (2d Cir.)
Kenneth Ziffren	1965	1966	UCLA (1965)	none
Carl D. Lawson (shared with Reed)	1965	1966	Stanford (1963)	none
Phillip E. Johnson	1966	1967	Chicago (1965)	Traynor (Cal.)
C. Douglas Kranwinkle	1966	1967	Michigan (1965)	
Benno C. Schmidt, Jr.	1966	1967	Yale (1966)	
Harold Bolton Finn, III (shared with Reed)	1966	1967	Columbia (1966)	
Tyrone Brown	1967	1968	Cornell (1967)	none
J. Larry Nichols	1967	1968	Michigan (1967)	
Larry G. Simon	1967	1968	Yale (1965)	Weinfeld (S.D.N.Y.)
Charles H. Wilson, Jr.	1967	1968	Berkeley (1967)	
Scott H. Bice	1968	1969	USC (1968)	none
Earl C. Dudley, Jr. (shared with Reed)	1968	1969	Virginia (1967)	none
C. Boyden Gray	1968	1969	North Carolina (1968)	none
Paul J. Meyer	1968	1969	Notre Dame (1967)	Schaefer (Illinois)
Robert T. Lasky	1968	1969	Penn (1967)	Roberts (Pennsylvania)
Edward L. Strohbehn, Jr.	1969	1970	Yale (1969)	none
John W. Keker	1970	1971	Yale (1970)	none
G. Edward White	1971	1972	Harvard (1970)	
Theodore ("Ted") Eisenberg (shared with Burger)	1973	1974	Penn (1972)	? (D.C. Cir)

Warren E. Burger

June 23, 1969 –
September 26, 1986

Clerk	Started	Finished	School (year)	Previous clerkship
Robert Fabrikant	1969	1970	Georgetown (1968)	Burger (D.C. Cir)
Charles F. Lettow	1969	1970	Stanford (1968)	Duniway (9th Cir.)
Harry A. Rissetto	1969	1970	Georgetown (1968)	Sirica (D.D.C.)
Michael David Zimmerman	1969	1970	Utah (1969)	
George Marshall Moriarty (hired by Burger, shared with White, Black, Stewart)	1969	1970	Harvard (1968)	Aldrich (1st Cir.)
Jerry W. Snider (shared with Clark)	1969	1970	Houston (1969)	
James R. Atwood	1970	1971	Stanford (1969)	Hufstedler (9th Cir.)
David O. Bickart	1970	1971	NYU (1969)	Wyatt (S.D.N.Y.)
Theodore L. Garrett (shared with Clark)	1970	1971	Columbia (1968)	J. J. Smith (2d Cir.)
John M. Harmon	1971	1971	Duke (1969)	Hugo Black / G. Bell (5th Cir.)
William B. Elmore, Jr.	1971	1972	Columbia (1970)	
C. Douglas Floyd	1971	1972	Stanford (1967)	
John H. Korns	1971	1972	Harvard (1970)	Wisdom (5th Cir.)
Richard W. Skillman	1971	1972	NYU (1970)	J. J. Gibbons (3d Cir.)
Lee C. Bollinger	1972	1973	Columbia (1971)	Feinberg (2d Cir.)
Daniel R. Coquillette	1972	1973	Harvard (1971)	Braucher (Mass.)
Richard D. Diamond	1972	1973	Yale (1971)	Weigel (N.D. Cal.)
Jack M. Weiss	1972	1973	Harvard (1971)	Wisdom (5th Cir.)
Arthur F. Fergenson	1973	1974	Yale (1972)	Griesa (S.D.N.Y.)
Kenneth F. Ripple	1973	1975	Virginia (1968)	none
Joseph C. Zengerle	1973	1974	Michigan (1971)	McGowan (D.C. Cir)
David G. Boutte	1973	1974	USC (1972)	Chambers (9th Cir.)
Theodore ("Ted") Eisenberg (shared with Warren)	1973	1974	Penn (1972)	? (D.C. Cir)
Stephen B. Burbank	1974	1975	Harvard (1973)	Braucher (Mass.)
Timothy D. Kelly	1974	1975	Minnesota (1973)	Neville (D. Minn.)
Stephen S. Walters	1974	1975	Stanford (1972)	Duniway (9th Cir.)
Candace Kovacic-Fleischer	1975	1976	Northeastern (1974)	Oakes (2d Cir.)
Kenneth W. Starr	1975	1977	Duke (1973)	Burger / Dyer (5th Cir.)
Peter L. Rossiter	1975	1976	Yale (1973)	Rubin (E.D. La.)
W. Wayne Drinkwater, Jr.	1976	1977	Mississippi (1974)	Keady (N.D. Miss.)
Alex Kozinski	1976	1977	UCLA (1975)	Kennedy (9th Cir.)
Paul J. Ondrasik, Jr.	1976	1977	Virginia (1975)	Seitz (3d Cir.)
Henry L. Parr, Jr.	1977	1978	Virginia (1976)	Haynsworth (4th Cir.)
Monte N. Stewart	1977	1978	BYU (1976)	J. C. Wallace (9th Cir.)
Stewart Jay	1977	1978	Harvard (1976)	Hart (D.D.C.)
Robinson B. Lacy	1978	1979	Harvard (1977)	M. Pollack (S.D.N.Y.)
Carter G. Phillips	1978	1979	Northwestern (1977)	Sprecher (7th Cir.)
Walter F. ("Jack") Pratt Jr.	1978	1979	Yale (1977)	C. Clark (5th Cir.)
Christopher G. Walsh, Jr.	1978	1979	NYU (1976)	Bauer (7th Cir.)
Neil Eggleston	1979	1980	Northwestern (1978)	Hunter (3d Cir.)
Paul L. Shechtman	1979	1980	Harvard (1979)	L. Pollak (E.D. Pa.)
Michael J. Wahoske	1979	1980	Notre Dame (1979)	
John C. Ale	1980	1981	Virginia (1979)	Tamm (D.C. Cir)
John M. Coleman	1980	1981	Chicago (1979)	Butzner (4th Cir.)
John E. Sexton	1980	1981	Harvard (1979)	Bazelon (D.C. Cir) / Leventhal (D.C. Cir)
James L. Volling	1980	1981	GW (1979)	R. Robb (D.C. Cir)
James D. Holzhauer	1981	1982	Michigan (1980)	Ainsworth (5th Cir.)
Judith A. McMorrow	1981	1982	Notre Dame (1980)	Merritt (6th Cir.)
Christopher J. Wright	1981	1982	Stanford (1980)	Sneed (9th Cir.)
Rochelle C. Dreyfuss	1982	1983	Columbia (1981)	Feinberg (2d Cir.)
Douglas B. Levene	1982	1983	Michigan (1981)	Lumbard (2d Cir.)
Thomas B. Green	1982	1983	Utah (1980)	McKay (10th Cir.)
Daniel H. Foote	1982	1983	Harvard (1981)	Gignoux (D. Me.)
Mark B. Helm	1983	1984	Harvard (1982)	McGowan (D.C. Cir)
Rebecca Hurley	1983	1984	SMU (1982)	I. Goldberg (5th Cir.)
Peter M. Lieb	1983	1984	Michigan (1982)	Kearse (2d Cir.)
J. Michael Luttig	1983	1984	Virginia (1981)	Scalia (D.C. Cir.)
Ray W. Campbell	1984	1985	Virginia (1983)	Wilkey (D.C. Cir)
Michael R. Lazerwitz	1984	1985	Chicago (1983)	Friendly (2d Cir.)
Wallace K. Lightsey	1984	1985	Harvard (1983)	Wisdom (5th Cir.)
Brian J. Martin	1984	1985	Harvard (1982)	Eschbach (7th Cir.)
Paul G. Cassell	1985	1986	Stanford (1984)	Scalia (D.C. Cir.)
Karl S. Coplan	1985	1986	Columbia (1984)	Garth (3d Cir.)
Timothy E. Flanigan	1985	1986	Virginia (1981)	none
Matthew M. Neumeier	1985	1986	Harvard (1984)	J. C. Wallace (9th Cir.)
Gene C. Schaerr (shared with Scalia)	1986	1987	Yale (1985)	Starr (D.C. Cir)
Bruce P. Brown	1985	1986	Georgia (1984)	Tamm (D.C. Cir)
Gregory S. Dovel (shared with Scalia)	1987	1988	Harvard (1986)	J. C. Wallace (9th Cir.)
William K. Kelley (shared with Scalia)	1988	1989	Harvard (1987)	Starr (D.C. Cir)
Von G. Keetch (shared with Scalia)	1989	1990	BYU (1987)	G. Pratt (2d Cir.)
Ashby D. Boyle, II (shared with O'Connor)	1990	1991	Columbia (1990)	None
John E. Barry (shared with Kennedy)	1991	1992	Columbia (1985)	L. Campbell (1st Cir.)
Karl M. Tilleman (shared with Thomas)	1992	1993	BYU (1990)	J. Noonan (9th Cir.)
James E. Gauch (shared with Thomas)	1993	1994	Chicago (1989)	D. A. Nelson (6th Cir.)
Eric A. Grant (shared with Thomas)	1994	1995	Berkeley (1990)	E. Jones (5th Cir.)

William Rehnquist

September 26, 1986 –
September 3, 2005

Clerk	Started	Finished	School (year)	Previous clerkship
David G. Leitch	1986	1987	Virginia (1985)	Wilkinson (4th Cir.)
William R. Lindsay	1986	1987	Berkeley (1985)	McGowan (D.C. Cir)
Laura E. Little	1986	1987	Temple (1985)	Hunter (3d Cir.)
J. Anthony Downs	1987	1988	Chicago (1986)	Oakes (2d Cir.)
R. Charles Miller	1987	1988	Penn (1985)	S. Robinson (D.C. Cir)
William L. Taylor	1987	1988	Yale (1986)	Wisdom (5th Cir.)
Lindley J. Brenza	1988	1989	Chicago (1987)	Easterbrook (7th Cir.)
Robert Giuffra	1988	1989	Yale (1987)	R. Winter (2d Cir.)
Melissa L. Saunders	1988	1989	Virginia (1987)	J. D. Phillips (4th Cir.)
Steven Colloton	1989	1990	Yale (1988)	Silberman (D.C. Cir.)
Barry P. McDonald	1989	1990	Northwestern (1988)	Logan (10th Cir.)
James K. Vines	1989	1990	Washington & Lee (1988)	Merhige (E.D. Va.)
Jeffrey L. Bleich	1990	1991	Berkeley (1989)	Mikva (D.C. Cir.)
Bruce R. Braun	1990	1991	Virginia (1989)	Flaum (7th Cir.)
Monica J. Wahl (Shaffer)	1990	1991	Chicago (1989)	P. Higginbotham (5th Cir.)
Audrey J. Anderson	1991	1992	Michigan (1990)	H. Greene (D.D.C.)
Eric F. Scheuermann	1991	1992	Harvard (1990)	J. C. Wallace (9th Cir.)
Ronald J. Tenpas	1991	1992	Virginia (1990)	L. Pollak (E.D. Pa.)
Gregory G. Garre	1992	1993	GW (1991)	Scirica (3d Cir.)
Richard C. Pepperman, II	1992	1993	Penn (1990)	Becker (3d Cir.)
Celestine McConville	1992	1993	Georgetown (1991)	C. Hall (9th Cir.) / Nugent (N.D. Ohio)
Landis Cox Best	1993	1994	Duke (1992)	Tilley (M.D.N.C.)
Brian M. Morris	1993	1994	Stanford (1992)	J. Noonan (9th Cir.)
James E. Ryan	1993	1994	Virginia (1992)	J. C. Wallace (9th Cir.)
Jody A. Manier (Kris)	1994	1995	Chicago (1993)	S. Williams (D.C. Cir.)
Stephen M. Sargent	1994	1995	BYU (1993)	Tacha (10th Cir.)
Paul J. Zidlicky	1994	1995	GW (1993)	F. Magill (8th Cir.)
Eric R. Claeys	1995	1996	USC (1994)	Brunetti (9th Cir.)
Shawn F. Fagan	1995	1996	Harvard (1994)	D. Ginsburg (D.C. Cir.)
Courtney Simmons (Elwood)	1995	1996	Yale (1994)	Luttig (4th Cir.)
Ted Cruz	1996	1997	Harvard (1995)	Luttig (4th Cir.)
Richard W. Garnett	1996	1997	Yale (1995)	R. Arnold (8th Cir.)
David H. Hoffman	1996	1997	Chicago (1995)	Jacobs (2d Cir.)
John P. Kelsh	1997	1998	Northwestern (1996)	Sentelle (D.C. Cir.)
Matthew T. Martens	1997	1998	North Carolina (1996)	Sentelle (D.C. Cir.)
Sarah O. Newland (Jorgensen)	1997	1998	Harvard (1995)	Silberman (D.C. Cir.)
Christopher P. Bowers	1998	1999	Chicago (1997)	Rymer (9th Cir.)
Neil M. Richards	1998	1999	Virginia (1997)	Niemeyer (4th Cir.)
Robert G. Schaffer	1998	1999	Duke (1996)	Tacha (10th Cir.)
Kevin R. Boyle	1999	2000	Arizona (1997)	Brunetti (9th Cir.)
Jay T. Jorgensen	1999	2000	BYU (1997)	Alito (3d Cir.)
Rosemarie K. ("Mo") Nixon (Blase)	1999	2000	Notre Dame (1998)	Loken (8th Cir.)
Luke A. Sobota	2000	2001	Chicago (1999)	Rymer (9th Cir.)
Mark T. Stancil	2000	2001	Virginia (1999)	Ebel (10th Cir.)
Jocelyn E. Strauber (Gordon)	2000	2001	Duke (1998)	Randolph (D.C. Cir)
Gregg Costa	2001	2002	Texas (1999)	Randolph (D.C. Cir)
Heidi C. Doerhoff (Vollet)	2001	2002	Missouri (2000)	Gibson (8th Cir.)
Brett H. McGurk	2001	2002	Columbia (1999)	Jacobs (2d Cir.) / G. Lynch (S.D.N.Y.)
Leah O. Brannon	2002	2003	Harvard (1999)	D. Ginsburg (D.C. Cir.)
Andrew R. DeVooght	2002	2003	Illinois (2000)	Kanne (7th Cir.)
Robert K. Hur	2002	2003	Stanford (2001)	Kozinski (9th Cir.)
Leon F. DeJulius	2003	2004	Notre Dame (2002)	O'Scannlain (9th Cir.)
Courtney C. Gilligan (Saleski)	2003	2004	GW (2002)	F. Magill (8th Cir.)
Aaron M. Streett	2003	2004	Texas (2002)	Sentelle (D.C. Cir.)
Jeffrey L. Oldham	2004	2005	Northwestern (2003)	Wilkinson (4th Cir.)
Julius N. Richardson	2004	2005	Chicago (2003)	Posner (7th Cir.)
Ryan Ashby Shores	2004	2005	Virginia (2003)	Ripple (7th Cir.)
Mark W. Mosier	2005	September 3, 2005	Chicago (2004)	Tacha (10th Cir.)
Ann E. O'Connell	2005	September 3, 2005	GW (2004)	F. Magill (8th Cir.)
Michael S. Passaportis	2005	September 3, 2005	Virginia (2004)	Wilkinson (4th Cir.)

John Roberts

September 29, 2005 –
Incumbent

Clerk	Started	Finished	School (year)	Previous clerkship
Daniel P. Kearney Jr.	September 29, 2005	2006	Yale (2004)	Roberts (D.C. Cir.)
Mark W. Mosier	September 29, 2005	2006	Chicago (2004)	Rehnquist / Tacha (10th Cir.)
Ann E. O'Connell	September 29, 2005	2006	GW (2004)	Rehnquist / F. Magill (8th Cir.)
Michael S. Passaportis	September 29, 2005	2006	Virginia (2004)	Rehnquist / Wilkinson (4th Cir.)
Kosta S. Stojilkovic	September 29, 2005	2006	Virginia (2004)	Roberts (D.C. Cir.)
Felicia H. Ellsworth	2006	2007	Chicago (2005)	Boudin (1st Cir.)
George W. Hicks, Jr.	2006	2007	Harvard (2005)	J. R. Brown (D.C. Cir.)
Keenan D. Kmiec	2006	2007	Berkeley (2004)	Sentelle (D.C. Cir.) / Alito (3d Cir.)
Paul Jeremy Nathanson	2006	2007	Harvard (2004)	Silberman (D.C. Cir.) / Niemeyer (4th Cir.)
Jason T. Burnette	2007	2008	Georgia (2006)	R. L. Anderson (11th Cir.)
Josh Hawley	2007	2008	Yale (2006)	McConnell (10th Cir.)
Anton Metlitsky	2007	2008	Harvard (2005)	Garland (D.C. Cir.)
Erin Eileen Morrow (Hawley)	2007	2008	Yale (2005)	Wilkinson (4th Cir.)
William P. Baude	2008	2009	Yale (2007)	McConnell (10th Cir.)
Jeffrey M. Harris	2008	2009	Harvard (2006)	Sentelle (D.C. Cir.) / Silberman (D.C. Cir.)
Erin E. Murphy	2008	2009	Georgetown (2006)	Sykes (7th Cir.)
Porter Noell Wilkinson	2008	2009	Virginia (2007)	Kavanaugh (D.C. Cir.)
Roman Martinez, V	2009	2010	Yale (2008)	Kavanaugh (D.C. Cir.)
James M. McDonald	2009	2010	Virginia (2007)	Sutton (6th Cir.)
Stephen E. Sachs	2009	2010	Yale (2007)	Williams (D.C. Cir.)
Erik R. Zimmerman	2009	2010	Stanford (2007)	Wilkinson (4th Cir.)
Paul T. Crane, III	2010	2011	Virginia (2007)	Wilkinson (4th Cir.)
Kate E. Heinzelman	2010	2011	Yale (2009)	Garland (D.C. Cir.)
Kathryn E. Tarbert	2010	2011	Vanderbilt (2005)	D. Ginsburg (D.C. Cir.)
David Zac Hudson	2010	2011	Yale (2009)	Kavanaugh (D.C. Cir.)
Christopher J. DiPompeo	2011	2012	Penn (2009)	Niemeyer (4th Cir.)
Frederick Liu	2011	2012	Yale (2008)	O'Scannlain (9th Cir.) / Colloton (8th Cir.)
Colleen E. Roh	2011	2012	Harvard (2010)	Garland (D.C. Cir.)
Hagan C. Scotten	2011	2012	Harvard (2010)	Kavanaugh (D.C. Cir.)
Caroline C. Edsall (Littleton)	2012	2013	Yale (2010)	Kavanaugh (D.C. Cir.) / Brody (E.D. Pa.)
Jonathan Y. Ellis	2012	2013	Penn (2010)	Randolph (D.C. Cir.)
Sina Kian	2012	2013	Stanford (2010)	Tatel (D.C. Cir.) / Griffith (D.C. Cir.)
Benjamin W. Snyder	2012	2013	Harvard (2011)	Sutton (6th Cir.)
Morgan L. Goodspeed	2013	2014	Harvard (2012)	Kavanaugh (D.C. Cir.)
Michael R. Huston	2013	2014	Michigan (2011)	Kethledge (6th Cir.)
Judson O. Littleton	2013	2014	Texas (2008)	Randolph (D.C. Cir)
Matthew A. Shapiro	2013	2014	Yale (2012)	Wilkinson (4th Cir.)
Kathryn McGlenn Cherry	2014	2015	Yale (2013)	Kavanaugh (D.C. Cir.)
Christopher G. Michel	2014	2015	Yale (2013)	Kavanaugh (D.C. Cir.)
Graham E. Phillips	2014	2015	Harvard (2013)	Griffith (D.C. Cir.) / Bates (D.D.C.)
Gregory Ryan Snyder	2014	2015	Notre Dame (2012)	Kethledge (6th Cir.)
Jacob T. ("Jake") Brege	2015	2016	Michigan (2012)	Sentelle (D.C. Cir.) / Boasberg (D.D.C.)
Daniel J. Feith	2015	2016	Yale (2012)	Griffith (D.C. Cir.) / Sullivan (S.D.N.Y.)
Joseph Ben Tyson, III	2015	2016	Virginia (2014)	Srinivasan (D.C. Cir.)
Katherine Booth Wellington	2015	2016	Harvard (2013)	Kavanaugh (D.C. Cir.)
Thomas S. Burnett	2016	2017	Harvard (2014)	Livingston (2d Cir.)
Marguerite B. Colson	2016	2017	Yale (2015)	Kavanaugh (D.C. Cir.)
Rachel G. Miller-Ziegler	2016	2017	Harvard (2015)	Garland (D.C. Cir.)
Conor M. Reardon	2016	2017	Duke (2014)	Cabranes (2d Cir.) / Chatigny (D. Conn.)
Usha Chilukuri Vance	2017	2018	Yale (2013)	Thapar (E.D. Ky.) / Kavanaugh (D.C. Cir.)
Charles S. Dameron	2017	2018	Yale (2015)	Kethledge (6th Cir.)
Caroline A. Flynn	2017	2018	Michigan (2013)	Flaum (7th Cir.) / Srinivasan (D.C. Cir.)
Aaron Rizkalla	2017	2018	Harvard (2016)	Wilkinson (4th Cir.)
Evelyn Diana Blacklock	2018	2019	Harvard (2016)	Sullivan (S.D.N.Y.) / Kavanaugh (D.C. Cir.)
Cole T. Carter	2018	2019	Harvard (2016)	Feinerman (N.D. Ill.) / Sutton (6th Cir.)
Julie M.K. Siegal	2018	2019	Northwestern (2014)	Feinerman (N.D. Ill.) / Kavanaugh (D.C. Cir.)
Michael A. Clemente	2018	2019	Yale (2016)	Griffith (D.C. Cir.) / D. Hamilton (7th Cir.)
Zaki Anwar	2019	2020	Harvard (2017)	Sutton (6th Cir.) / Srinivasan (D.C. Cir.)
David Christopher Beylik	2019	2020	Harvard (2018)	Kavanaugh (D.C. Cir.)
Joseph P. Falvey	2019	2020	Yale (2017)	Friedrich (D.D.C.) / Griffith (D.C. Cir.)
Megan Braun	2019	2020	Yale (2016)	Brinkema (E.D. Va.) / Katzmann (2d Cir.)
Leslie B. Arffa	2020	2021	Yale (2018)	Livingston (2d Cir.) / Boasberg (D.D.C.)
Patrick J. Fuster	2020	2021	Chicago (2018)	Watford (9th Cir.) / Chhabria (N.D. Cal.)
Benjamin A. Gifford	2020	2021	Harvard (2017)	Rakoff (S.D.N.Y.) / Katzmann (2d Cir.)
Stephen J. Hammer	2020	2021	Harvard (2018)	Sutton (6th Cir.) / Katsas (D.C. Cir.)
Samuel Adkisson	2021	2022	Yale (2018)	Thapar (6th Cir.) / Katsas (D.C. Cir.)
Christina R. Gay	2021	2022	Chicago (2020)	Grant (11th Cir.)
Maxwell F. Gottschall	2021	2022	Harvard (2019)	Srinivasan (D.C. Cir.) / Boasberg (D.D.C.)
Dennis D. Howe	2021	2022	Harvard (2018)	Livingston (2d Cir.) / Friedrich (D.D.C.)
Mark C. Gillespie	2022	2023	Harvard (2021)	Grant (11th Cir.)
Grace A. J. Greene	2022	2023	Penn (2020)	Pratter (E.D. Pa.) / Bibas (3d Cir.)
Benjamin E. Harris	2022	2023	Harvard (2020)	Sutton (6th Cir.) / Chhabria (N.D. Cal.)
Samir H. Doshi	2022	2023	Yale (2018)	Lohier (2d Cir.) / Moss (D.D.C)
Jason Bell	2023	2024	Harvard (2021)	Higginson (5th Cir.) / Kovner (E.D.N.Y.)
Alex Cave	2023	2024	Harvard (2020)	Srinivasan (D.C. Cir.)
Sakina Haji	2023	2024	Chicago (2021)	Newsom (11th Cir.)
Ben Daus	2023	2024	Yale (2021)	Kovner (E.D.N.Y.) / Thapar (6th Cir.)
Leigh E. Kramer	2024	2025	Northwestern (2022)	McKeown (9th Cir.)
Elise Kostial	2024	2025	Yale (2022)	Katsas (D.C. Cir.) / W. Pryor (11th Cir.)
Hassaan Shahawy	2024	2025	Harvard (2022)	Barron (1st Cir.)
Kathryn C. Reed	2024	2025	Harvard (2022)	Millett (D.C. Cir.)
William "Billy" Eisenhauer	2025	2026	Notre Dame (2023)	Thapar (6th Cir.) / Beaton (W.D. Ky.)
Brynne Follman	2025	2026	Chicago (2023)	Bibas (3d Cir.) / Rearden (S.D.N.Y.)
John Sutton	2025	2026	Harvard (2024)	Livingston (2d Cir.)
Daniel Ergas	2025	2026	Harvard (2023)	Engelmayer (S.D.N.Y.) / Sutton (6th Cir.)
Denis Fedin	2026		Harvard (2024)	Friedrich (D.D.C.) / Wilkinson (4th Cir.)
Thomas Koenig	2026		Harvard (2024)	Katsas (D.C. Cir.) / Thapar (6th Cir.)
Rachel Sommers	2026		Yale (2022)	Rakoff (S.D.N.Y.) / Lohier (2d Cir.)
Andy Gu	2026		Harvard (2024)	Sutton (6th Cir.) / Kovner (E.D.N.Y.)
Jack Brake	2027		Chicago (2025)	Srinivasan (D.C. Cir.) / Boasberg (D.D.C.)
Chandler Cole	2027		Duke (2025)	Bibas (3d Cir.) / Friedrich (D.D.C.)
Sajjan "Saj" Sri-Kumar	2027		Stanford (2024)	Bress (9th Cir.) / Subramanian (S.D.N.Y.)
Richard Nehrboss	2027		Harvard (2025)	Thapar (6th Cir.) / Katsas (D.C. Cir.)

== Additional sources ==
- Baier, Paul R. (1973). "The Law Clerks: Profile of an Institution," Vanderbilt L. Rev. 26: 1125–77.
- "Georgia Law Alumni Who Have Clerked for a U.S. Supreme Court Justice," Advocate, Spring/Summer 2004 (listing 6 names).
- Judicial Clerkship Handbook, USC Gould Law School, 2013-2014, p. 33, Appendix B.
- "Law Clerks of Chief Justice Earl Warren," Regional Oral History Office, The Bancroft Library, University of California, Berkeley (2015). Retrieved August 15, 2016.
- Newland, Charles A. (June 1961). "Personal Assistants to the Supreme Court Justices: The Law Clerks," Oregon L. Rev. 40: 306–07.
- News of Supreme Court clerks. University of Virginia Law School, list of clerks, 2004-2018.
- University of Michigan clerks to the Supreme Court, 1991-2017, University of Michigan Law School Web site (2016). Retrieved September 20, 2016.
- Ward, Artemus and David L. Weiden (2006). Sorcerers' Apprentices: 100 Years of Law Clerks at the United States Supreme Court. New York, NY: New York University Press. ISBN 978-0814794203, ISBN 0814794203.
