= Coquillette =

Coquillette is a surname. Notable people with the surname include:

- Daniel R. Coquillette (fl. from 1966), American legal scholar
- Trace Coquillette (born 1974), American baseball infielder
