= Audrey Anderson =

Audrey Anderson may refer to:

- Audrey Marie Anderson (born 1975), American actress and model
- Audrey J. Anderson, American attorney
- Audrey Anderson, character in the 2020 film Legion
