= Gabriella Eichinger Ferro-Luzzi =

Italian anthropologist and dravidologist

- Born: 1931 (age 94–95); German Reich
- Citizenship: Italy
- Occupations: Anthropologist; Dravidologist

Academic background
- Education: Doctor of Philosophy
- Alma mater: University of Rome (Ph.D.)

Academic work
- Discipline: Anthropology; Dravidology
- Institutions: Professor emerita of Asian Studies, Istituto Universitario Orientale
- Main interests: Tamil studies

Gabriella Eichinger Ferro-Luzzi (born 1931) is an Italian anthropologist and Dravidologist who has done field studies in India, mainly in the State of Tamil Nadu.

== Early life ==
Ferro-Luzzi was born in 1931 in Germany.

== Education ==
Ferro-Luzzi did a Diploma in Modern Languages at the University of Mainz, Germany in 1954. In 1968, she completed her Ph.D. in geography at the University of Rome with a doctoral thesis in anthropology. Between 1985 and 1991, she worked briefly at the University of Venice, University of Bologna, and University of Rome. She taught Tamil language and literature at the University of Naples "L'Orientale" and also worked as a professor of Asian Studies at the university.

== Academic career and research ==
Since 1971, Ferro-Luzzi has traveled several times to India (mostly to Tamil Nadu), to execute field studies. Sometime before 2019 (probably in March 2003), she also interacted with Tamil folklorist-author Ki. Rajanarayanan (1923-2021), who was living in the Union Territory of Puducherry.

Her research studies have been focused on the study of the culture of Hindus as viewed through the lens of Tamil literature; the mythologies and rituals of Hindus; and the "culture-specific and culture-free attitudes towards food, purity and pollution". According to Heinz Scheifinger, she is of the view that Hinduism shows "unity within diversity".

She worked as a teacher in Italy at the University of Venice, University of Bologna, and University of Rome between 1985 and 1991. She had taught the Tamil language at the Institute of Linguistics of University of Rome. She worked at the University of Naples "L'Orientale" in Italy as an associate professor of Tamil language and literature from 1992–93 to 2000–01. She also served as a professor at the department of Asian Studies of the university. She is retired.

=== Naivedyam ===
According to Peter Berger, in Ferro-Luzzi's view, the Naivedyam to gods should be "understood as acts of communication and function like linguistic elements, that is, through opposition, combination, and redundancy".

== Written work ==
Ferro-Luzzi's The Maze of Fantasy in Tamil Folktales (2002) was reviewed by Ülo Valk, Sascha Ebeling, and Herman Tieken. Her work was a monographic research on the "Tamil folklore in the Pan-Indian context" and was built on around 50 published collections of Tamil folktales. Valk stated that she provided "several valuable observations" on "dyadic patterns in Tamil folktales, their didactic function and inter-generic connections with songs and proverbs, and conceptualization of the corpus of tales as a polythetic network". Valk suggested that though she was "careful about providing the exact references to the original publications", she did not focus much on "source criticism". She examined a few theories of folktale research and Valk was of the view that her criticism of the contemporary theories was "relatively thin" in comparison to the analytical studies by scholars like Bengt Holbek and Max Lüthi. According to Valk, in future, her research would "probably" be used as a tool for classifying the tales from India which was initiated by Heda Jason, Jonas Balys, Stith Thompson, and Warren E. Roberts.

Ebeling stated that Ferro-Luzzi's research provided a description of "whether and how a particular theme is treated in a Tamil folktale" and also investigated "the interplay of Indian and Western motifs within folktales or motifs which recur in otherwise unconnected tales". According to Ebeling, she criticized the common "tale type approach" and laid stress on the "need to focus on motifs rather than tale types" in an analytical study of folktales. According to Ebeling, her suggested approach for the folktales studies is of assistance in "comparative and cross-cultural studies" of the folktales. Tieken of Leiden's Kern Institute stated that she drew the book's whole material "from existing collections of folktales mainly in Tamil" and she did not "deal with these collections as a phenomenon in itself". He saw her work as translation of excerpts from Hitopadesha in Tamil language, and according to Tieken, the efficacy of her work "for folktale studies is limited".

Ferro-Luzzi's coauthored The Taste of Laughter: Aspects of Tamil Humour (1992) was reviewed by Jawaharlal Nehru University's Sadhana Naithani and Tamil University's Aru Ramanathan and N. Palani. Ramanathan and Palani stated that she explored "multifarious facets" of a village in Tamil Nadu from the aspects of anthropology and literature. She threw light on the village's "cross-cultural and culturally specific" aspects in relation to Ki. Rajanarayanan's works. According to Ramanathan and Palani, she provided insights on "the attitudes of the people toward land, tradition, animals and fellow beings, as well as the ignorance, skepticism, and pragmatism among the people" and was of the view that the people of India "seem to compartmentalize contradictory ideas". Naithani stated that her work was "largely descriptive, with few insights into the aspects of Tamil humor".

According to Laura E. Little, Ferro-Luzzi stressed that though incongruity appears very often in humor, it's not a requisite for humor. Little stated that her work presented the "most prominent challenge to incongruity's essential role in the humor process" and "humor scholars" take it "very seriously", however, they note that her research was "insufficiently theorized and insufficiently supported by examples". For example, Elliott Oring stated that her anatomization of jokes was "incomplete" and the examples provided by her were "questionable".

== Works ==
=== Books ===
Some of the books authored by Ferro-Luzzi are as follows:

- Ferro-Luzzi, G. E. (2002). The Maze of Fantasy in Tamil Folktales. Wiesbaden, Germany: Otto Harrassowitz Verlag. ISBN 978-3447045681. LCCN 2002505105. OCLC 491172336.
- Ferro-Luzzi, G. E. (1996). The Smell of the Earth: Rajanarayanan's Literary Description of Tamil Village Life. Naples, Italy: Istituto Universitario Orientale. LCCN 97202004. OCLC 470147668.
- Ferro-Luzzi, G. E. (1995). The "Incomprehensible" Writer: Tamil Culture in Ramamirtham's Work and Worldview. Wiesbaden, Germany: Otto Harrassowitz Verlag. ISBN 978-3447036771. LCCN 96178862. OCLC 468158527.
- Ferro-Luzzi, G. E. (1987). The Self-milking Cow and the Bleeding Liṅgam: Criss-cross of Motifs in Indian Temple Legends. Wiesbaden, Germany: Otto Harrassowitz Verlag. doi:10.1017/S0041977X0003487X. ISBN 978-3447027342. LCCN 88130932. OCLC 952960768. S2CID 162232163.

=== Selected papers ===
- Ferro-Luzzi, G. E.; Simoons, Frederick J.; Batra, S. M.; Chakravarti, A. K.; et al. (September 1979). "Questions in the Sacred–Cow Controversy [and Comments and Reply]". Current Anthropology. 20 (3). University of Chicago Press: 467–493. doi:10.1086/202319. JSTOR 2742106. S2CID 155439775.
- Ferro-Luzzi, G. E. (September 1977). "Ritual as Language: The Case of South Indian Food Offerings". Current Anthropology. 18 (3). University of Chicago Press: 507–514. doi:10.1086/201930. JSTOR 2741405. S2CID 144174632.
- Ferro-Luzzi, G. E. (1973) [Composed 1972]. "Food Avoidances of Pregnant Women in Tamilnad". Ecology of Food and Nutrition. 2 (4). Taylor & Francis: 259–266. Bibcode:1973EcoFN...2..259F. doi:10.1080/03670244.1973.9990346. S2CID 71004517.
- Ferro-Luzzi, G. E. (1997) [Composed 1986]. "The Polythetic–Prototype Approach to Hinduism". Written at Wilhelmsfeld, Germany. In Sontheimer, Günther-Dietz; Kulke, Hermann (eds.). Hinduism Reconsidered, Volume 3. European Conference of Modern South Asian Studies (Papers presented at 9th European Conference of Modern South Asian Studies, Heidelberg, 1986). South Asian Studies, No. 24 (2nd, revised ed.). New Delhi, India: Manohar. pp. 294–304. ISBN 978-8173041983. LCCN 97914295. OCLC 1179507103 – via Leibniz Information Centre.
- Ferro-Luzzi, G. E. (1977). "The Logic of South Indian Food Offerings". Anthropos. 72 (3/4). Nomos Verlagsgesellschaft mbH: 529–556. JSTOR 40459138.
- Ferro-Luzzi, G. E. (1974) [Composed 1972]. "Food Avoidances During the Puerperium and Lactation in Tamilnad". Ecology of Food and Nutrition. 3 (1). Taylor & Francis: 7–11. Bibcode:1974EcoFN...3....7F. doi:10.1080/03670244.1974.9990355. S2CID 75198020.
