= Judith A. McMorrow =

American legal scholar (born 1955)

Judith A. McMorrow (born 1955) is an American legal scholar serving as a Professor at Boston College Law School, where she teaches torts, professional responsibility and related topics. Her research interests include professional responsibility and age discrimination (with a focus on retirement policy.) McMorrow participates in several ongoing pro bono activities, including representing women in Massachusetts seeking commutation based on Battered Woman Syndrome. She has explained the role of lawyers in a democratic society. She also advocates interdisciplinary and international scholarship.

After graduating from Nazareth College and University of Notre Dame Law School in 1980, McMorrow clerked for Judge Gilbert S. Merritt of the United States Court of Appeals for the Sixth Circuit and Chief Justice Warren E. Burger of the United States Supreme Court. She practiced with the Washington D.C. law firm of Steptoe & Johnson before entering teaching in 1985, when she joined the faculty of Washington and Lee University School of Law.

== Selected works ==
Books

McMorrow, Judith; and Daniel R. Coquillette (2001). Federal law of attorney conduct, part of Moore’s Federal Practice (3d edition). New York : Lexis Publishing. ISBN 0820514101, ISBN 9780820514109.

Articles and Symposia

McMorrow, Judith A. (2007). "Creating Norms of Attorney Conduct in International Tribunals: A Case Study of the ICTY." Newton Centre, MA: Boston College Law School; Berkeley: The Berkeley Electronic Press [Host]. OCLC 778130414.

--- (2004). "The (F)Utility of Rules: Regulating Attorney Conduct in Federal Court Practice." Newton Centre, MA: Boston College Law School; Berkeley: The Berkeley Electronic Press [Host].

--- (2001). "Symposium-Lawyering for the Middle Class – The Advocate as Witness: Understanding Context, Culture and Client." Fordham L. Rev. 70(3): 945-983.

---; and Anthony R. Baldwin (1991). "Life After Law School: On Being a Retired Law Professor." Journal of Legal Education 41(3-4): 407-419.

--- (1991). "Civil Disobedience and the Lawyers Obligation to the Law." Newton Centre, MA: Boston College Law School; Berkeley: The Berkeley Electronic Press [Host]. OCLC 778153409.

--- (1990). "Employment Bonding and the End of Mandatory Retirement." Industrial Relations Law Journal 12(1): 197-216.

--- (1989). "Who owns rights: waiving and settling private rights of action." Villanova, Pa.: Villanova University Press. Reprinted from Villanova L. Rev. 34(3-4): 429-466.

== See also ==
- List of law clerks for the chief justice of the United States
