= Laura E. Little =

American lawyer

- Occupations: Legal scholar, author

Academic background
- Education: University of Pennsylvania, Temple University School of Law

Academic work
- Institutions: Temple University School of Law
- Main interests: Conflict of Laws, Federal Courts, Humor and the Law, First Amendment, Constitutional Law

Laura E. Little is an American legal scholar and author, specializing in conflict of laws, federal courts, humor and the law, the law of freedom of expression, and constitutional law. She is the James G. Schmidt Professor of Law at Temple University School of Law.

== Biography ==
Little graduated from the University of Pennsylvania, where she majored in economics. She went on to Temple University School of Law, receiving her J.D. During her time in law school, Little served as Editor-in-Chief of Temple Law Review. After graduation, Little served as a law clerk for United States Court of Appeals for the Third Circuit Judge James Hunter III and then clerked for Supreme Court of the United States Chief Justice William Rehnquist. Little later joined the law firm of Dechert Price & Rhoades and worked in general commercial litigation. In 1989, Little joined Kohn, Savett, Klein & Graf, P.C. where she represented the print media in Philadelphia in First Amendment matters.

In 1990, Little joined the full-time faculty at Temple University's Beasley School of Law. Her law teaching specializes in conflict of laws, federal courts, First Amendment, and constitutional law. Little has received the Temple University "Great Teacher" Award.

Little has served as an appellate advocate and expert consultant on matters related to the conflict of laws, federal jurisdiction, and the U.S. Constitution. She was appointed by the U.S. Court of Appeals for the Third Circuit to argue and brief the case of Trinsey v. Pennsylvania, which challenged senatorial succession processes under the U.S. Constitution's 17th Amendment.

Little's work includes academic analysis of U.S. federal judicial selection, which was quoted, cited, and relied on extensively by the Supreme Court of India in its decision striking down India's system for appointing judges.

Little is the author of a casebook on conflict of laws, and a bar lecturer, preparing students for the conflict of laws section of the Pennsylvania portion of the bar each year. The American Law Institute appointed Little to serve as the Associate Reporter of the Restatement Third of Conflict of Laws in 2014.

Little received a national award for her work, "Regulating Funny: Humor and the Law" published by Cornell Law Review, which analyzes how law prefers certain types of humor in the areas of trademark, contract, and employment discrimination. Her book, "Guilty Pleasures: Comedy and Law in America," was published by Oxford University Press in 2018.

== Books ==
- Guilty Pleasures: Comedy and Law in America (2018). Oxford, New York: Oxford University Press. 2018-12-03. ISBN 9780190625764.
- "Conflict of Laws (2d. 2018)". www.wklegaledu.com.
- "Federal Courts: Examples & Explanations (4th. 2019)". www.wklegaledu.com.

== Selected papers ==
- A Taxonomy of Taxonomies _ J. Legal Ed. _ (2021) (reviewing Pierre Schlag and Amy J. Griffin, How To Do Things With Legal Doctrine (2020)).
- Judicial Regulation of Humour in the United States, in Judges, Judging, and Humour (Jessica Milner Davis & Sharon Locklyer, eds., Palgrave MacMillan 2018).
- Laughing at Censorship published by Yale Law Journal (https://law.yale.edu/system/files/area/center/isp/documents/laura_little_-_why_is_censorship_funny_-_fesc.pdf).
- Erie’s Unintended Consequences, 52 Akron L. Rev. 275 (solicited Symposium piece 2019).
- Conflict of Laws Structure and Vision: Updating a Venerable Discipline, 31 Georgia State L. Rev. 231 (2015).
- Internet Defamation, Freedom of Expression, and the Lessons of Private International Law for the United States published in the European Yearbook of Private International Law, Vol. 14, 2012.
- Just a Joke: Defamatory Humor and Incongruity's Promise published by Southern California Interdisciplinary Law Journal (http://lawweb.usc.edu/why/students/orgs/ilj/assets/docs/21-1%20Little.pdf).
- Regulating Funny: Humor and the Law published by Cornell Law Review ().
- Hairsplitting and Complexity in Conflict of Laws: The Paradox of Formalism published by UC Davis Law Review.
- The ABA's Role in Prescreening Federal Judicial Candidates: Are We Ready to Give Up on the Lawyers? published by William & Mary Bill of Rights Journal (http://scholarship.law.wm.edu/cgi/viewcontent.cgi?article=1344&context=wmborj).
- Hiding with Words: Obfuscation, Avoidance, and Federal Jurisdiction Opinions published by UCLA Law Review.
- Characterization and Legal Discourse published in the Journal of Legal Education.
- Loyalty, Gratitude, and the Federal Judiciary published by the American University Law Review (http://digitalcommons.wcl.american.edu/cgi/viewcontent.cgi?article=1456&context=aulr).

== See also ==
- List of law clerks for the chief justice of the United States
