= Stewart Jay =

Stewart Jay holds the Pendleton Miller chair in law at the University of Washington School of Law, where he has taught since 1980. Prior to joining the UW faculty, he taught at the University of North Carolina for two years. Before entering teaching, Professor Jay clerked for two years, first with the U.S. District Court for the District of Columbia, and then for U.S. Supreme Court Justice Warren E. Burger. During 1984-85 he was a visiting professor at Georgetown University Law Center. His teaching and research interests include constitutional law and constitutional history. He was one of the principal drafters of Washington Reproductive Privacy Act, enacted by Initiative 120 in 1991.

He graduated from Georgetown University and Harvard Law School. He married Lisa Morelli Kennedy, daughter of John Wayles Kennedy and Dina Morelli and a fifth great-granddaughter of Founding Father and U.S. President Thomas Jefferson, in Seattle, Washington, in 1983.

== See also ==
- List of law clerks for the chief justice of the United States
