= Gene Schaerr =

American attorney (born 1957)

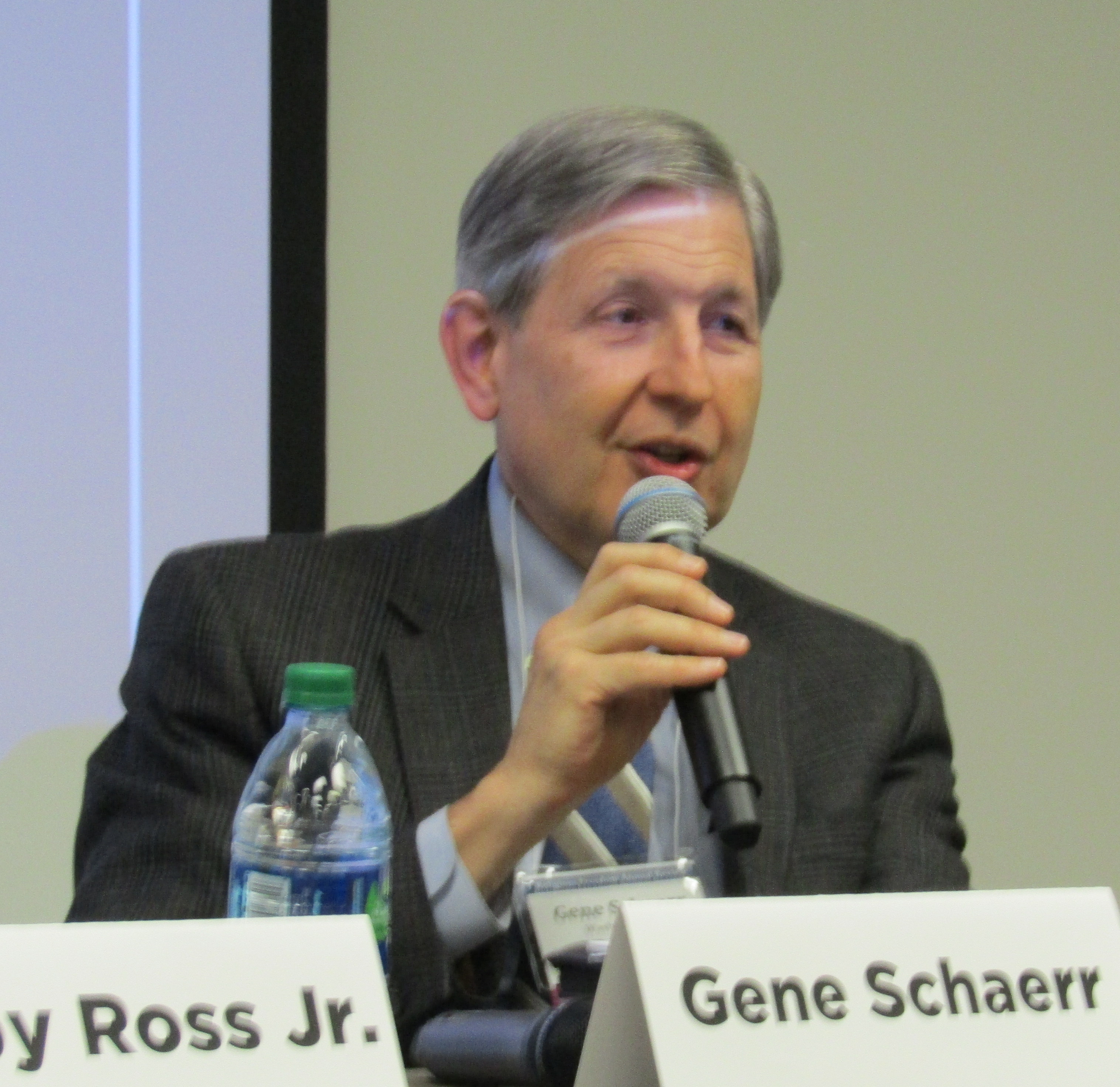
- Schaerr in 2018
- Born: Gene C. Schaerr; April 15, 1957 (age 69); Kanab, Utah, U.S.
- Education: Brigham Young University (BA); Yale University (MA, JD)
- Occupation: Attorney

Gene C. Schaerr (born April 15, 1957) is an American attorney.

== Biography ==
Schaerr was born in Kanab, Utah, and educated in the public schools. In 1981, he received a B.A. degree from Brigham Young University, and then earned master's degrees in economics and philosophy from Yale University in 1985 and 1986. After graduating from Yale Law School in 1985, where he was a member of the Yale Law Journal, he served as a law clerk for D.C. Circuit Judge Ken Starr, and from 1986 to 1987 for U.S. Supreme Court Justices Warren Burger and Antonin Scalia.

Schaerr is a litigator in state and federal appellate courts, including the U.S. Supreme Court. In 2014, he was chosen to represent the state of Utah as outside counsel in Kitchen v. Herbert, the state's legal action defending the state ban on same-sex marriage. In 2015, he also submitted an amici curiae brief on behalf of 100 scholars of marriage to the U.S. Supreme Court in Obergefell v. Hodges, the landmark Supreme Court case on same-sex marriage. The brief argued, among other things, that consistent with patterns in European countries and American states that have adopted same-sex marriage, opposite-sex marriage rates will likely drop as a result of redefining marriage as a genderless institution. This will result, over the next fertility cycle (30 years), in fewer children born to married parents, fewer children born overall since unmarried women have lower birth rates, and more abortions since unmarried women have higher rates of abortion. Although the latter claim was criticized in various press outlets, Schaerr defended the brief and its use of decomposition analysis—a technique frequently used by demographers—on the blog Bench Memos.

== See also ==
- List of law clerks for the chief justice of the United States
- List of law clerks for the ninth seat of the Supreme Court of the United States
