= Patrick Walsh (Georgia politician) =

American politician

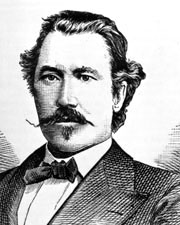

Mayor of Augusta, Georgia
- In office 1897 – March 19, 1899
- Preceded by: William B. Young
- Succeeded by: Jacob Phinizy

United States Senator from Georgia
- In office April 2, 1894 – March 3, 1895
- Preceded by: Alfred H. Colquitt
- Succeeded by: Augustus O. Bacon

Member of the Georgia General Assembly
- In office 1872–1876

Personal details
- Born: January 1, 1840 Ballingarry, County Limerick, Ireland
- Died: March 19, 1899 (aged 59) Augusta, Georgia
- Party: Democratic

Patrick Walsh (January 1, 1840 – March 19, 1899) was an American politician and journalist.

== Biography ==
Walsh was born in Ballingarry, County Limerick, Ireland. With his parents he emigrated in 1852 to Charleston, South Carolina, where he was apprenticed to a printer. While working at this trade he attended night school and eventually entered Georgetown College (now Georgetown University) in Washington, D.C., in 1859, where he remained until the American Civil War.

In 1861, Walsh returned to Charleston, to fight for the Confederacy. He joined the state militia as a lieutenant of the Meagher Guards of the First Regiment, Carolina Rifle Militia. In 1862 he moved to Augusta, Georgia where he was an editor at the Augusta Chronicle and other papers. After the war, he was elected as State Representative in the Georgia General Assembly, serving as a Democrat, from 1872 until 1876. In 1884, he was elected as delegate-at-large to the Democratic National Convention. He also served as a member of the World's Columbian Fair Commission. In 1894, the Governor of Georgia appointed Walsh to fill an unexpired term in the United States Senate. He served as a Democratic senator, April 2, 1894 until March 3, 1895.

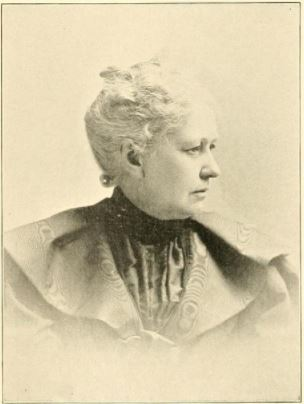
Anna Isabella McDonnald

In 1866 he married Anna Isabella McDonnald, born in Edgefield County, South Carolina, the daughter of John E. McDonnald, a native of Charleston, S.C., and for years a merchant of that city. Her mother was a native of London, England, and when about ten years of age immigrated to the United States and settled in Cambridge.

Walsh was later elected mayor of Augusta, and served from 1897 until his death on March 19, 1899. Walsh was buried in City Cemetery.

== See also ==
- List of United States senators born outside the United States

U.S. Senate
Preceded by Alfred H. Colquitt	U.S. senator (Class 2) from Georgia; 1894–1895; Served alongside: John B. Gordon	Succeeded by Augustus O. Bacon
