= Melissa L. Saunders =

American legal scholar

Melissa Rutledge Lamb Saunders is an American legal scholar who served as a professor at University of North Carolina Law School, where she taught civil procedure, civil rights and constitutional law from 1993 to 2012. Her research interests include mental health law and regulation. Since 2015, she has practiced as a clinical social worker at the University of North Carolina psychological counseling service.

== Biography ==
Saunders was born in Charlottesville, Virginia and educated at Yale University and University of Virginia Law School, where she served as executive editor of the Virginia Law Review and received a J.D. with Order of the Coif in 1987. She later obtained a M.S.W. from the University of North Carolina at Chapel Hill. After law school, Saunders was law clerk for Judge James Dickson Phillips Jr. of the United States Court of Appeals for the Fourth Circuit and Chief Justice William Rehnquist of the United States Supreme Court in 1988 to 1989. Following her clerkships, she practiced civil litigation and became a partner at Robinson, Bradshaw & Hinson P.A. in Charlotte, North Carolina.

In 1994 she joined the law faculty as an associate professor at the University of North Carolina at Chapel Hill and in 1998 she was named a full Professor. In 1997, she was the recipient of the McCall Award for teaching. In 1998 to 1999, she served as senior counsel to the North Carolina Attorney General and helped prepare the brief in Hunt v. Cromartie, 526 U.S. 541 (1999).

== Personal life ==
In 1987, she married Robert W. Saunders, a tax attorney who was her law school classmate, and they reside in Durham, North Carolina.

== See also ==
- List of law clerks for the chief justice of the United States

== Selected articles ==
- Saunders, Melissa L. (2001). "Of Minority Representation, Multiple-Race Responses, and Melting Pots: Redistricting in the New America". N.C. L. Rev. 79 (2): 1367.
- Saunders, Melissa L. (2000). "Reconsidering Shaw: The Miranda of Race-Conscious Districting". Yale Law Journal. 109 (7): 1603–1637. doi:10.2307/797602. JSTOR 797602.
- Saunders, Melissa L. (1997). "Equal Protection, Class Legislation, and Colorblindness". Mich. L. Rev. 96 (2): 245–337. doi:10.2307/1290069. JSTOR 1290069.
