= Stuart R. Pollak =

American judge (born 1937)

Personal details
- Born: Stuart Robert Pollak; August 24, 1937 (age 88) Los Angeles, California, U.S.
- Children: 4
- Education: Stanford University (BA, LLB)
- Occupation: Lawyer, judge

Stuart Robert Pollak (born August 24, 1937) is an American lawyer. He has served as a judge of the California First District Court of Appeal, Division Four, in San Francisco, California since 2002.

== Background ==
Pollak was born in San Pedro, California, in 1937. He graduated from Stanford University with a Bachelor of Arts in 1959 with great honors and earned membership in Phi Beta Kappa. At Harvard Law School, Pollak was book review and legislation editor of Harvard Law Review prior to receiving his Bachelor of Laws, magna cum laude in 1962.

Pollak served as a clerk for chief justice Earl Warren, and for justices Stanley Forman Reed and Harold Hitz Burton, from 1962 to 1963 before working for the United States Department of Justice Criminal Division, from 1963 to 1965. In 1964, he served as a staff member on the President's Commission on the Assassination of JFK, unofficially known as the Warren Commission. A year later he became an associate attorney at Howard Rice Nemerovski Canady & Pollak, where he stayed for 17 years until his appointment to the San Francisco Superior Court. On December 2, 1980, he argued the case of Minnick v. California Department of Corrections before the U.S. Supreme Court, winning a decision on behalf of the Department of Corrections in a race discrimination matter. He is married and has four children.

== Judicial experience ==
In 1982 Pollak was appointed to the California Superior Court in San Francisco. After 20 years as a trial judge, in 2002 Pollak was appointed to the California Court of Appeal in the First Appellate District by then-Governor Gray Davis. He was later retained by voters on November 5, 2002, with over 630,000 votes or 73% of the electorate. His current term expires in January 2027.

As a trial judge, Pollak presided over several high-profile cases. In May 1995, he decided the University of California, San Francisco, could release formerly confidential research reports on the negative health effects of smoking tobacco. In July 2000, he presided over a racial discrimination trial against the nation's largest wholesale bakery that resulted in a jury verdict of $120 million for a group of black employees. In November 2000, he ruled in favor of EBay on the issue of liability for bootlegged music sold on its website.

== See also ==
- List of law clerks for the chief justice of the United States
