= Walter F. Pratt =

American professor and legal scholar

Walter F. Pratt Jr.

Dean of the University of South Carolina School of Law
- In office July 1, 2006 – July 1, 2011
- Preceded by: Burnele Venable Powell
- Succeeded by: Robert M. Wilcox

Personal details
- Born: 1946 (age 79–80) Jackson, Mississippi, U.S.
- Spouse: Dorothy Overstreet Pratt
- Children: 2
- Education: Vanderbilt University (B.A.); Oxford University (D.Phil.); Yale University (J.D.)
- Occupation: Administrator, Professor

Walter Floyd "Jack" Pratt Jr. (born 1946) was the Educational Foundation Distinguished Professor at the University of South Carolina School of Law, where he served as dean from 2006 to 2011. Pratt's research focus is legal history, contracts and commercial law.

== Biography ==
Pratt was born and raised in Jackson, Mississippi. He studied at Vanderbilt University, and graduated with a B.A. in History magna cum laude in 1968. After serving three years as an officer in the United States Army, he was a Rhodes Scholar and in 1974 he obtained a D.Phil. in Politics from Balliol College, Oxford University. In 1977, received a J.D. from Yale Law School, where he served as an editor of the Yale Law Journal.

After graduation, he was law clerk for Judge Charles Clark of the United States Court of Appeals for the Fifth Circuit and then for Chief Justice Warren E. Burger of the Supreme Court of the United States during the 1978–1979 Term.

In 1979, he joined the faculty as an assistant professor of Duke University Law School and in 1982 was promoted to an associate professor. In the 1984-1985 academic year he was a visiting professor at the J. Reuben Clark Law School. In 1986, he moved to the faculty of the University of Notre Dame Law School, and in 1998 was named a full professor. There, he played several executive roles including Associate Dean for Academic Affairs and later Executive Associate Dean.

On July 1, 2006, Pratt was named dean and Educational Foundation Distinguished Professor of the University of South Carolina School of Law. In 2011, he announced he would not seek an extension of his five year term. After stepping down as dean, he has continued to teach at the Law School.

== Personal life ==
He is married to Dorothy Overstreet Pratt, a history professor and author, whom he met as an undergraduate at Vanderbilt, and they have two sons.

== See also ==
- List of law clerks for the chief justice of the United States

== Selected publications ==
=== Books ===
- Pratt, Walter F. (1979). Privacy in Britain. Lewisburg, PA: Bucknell University Press. ISBN 978-0838720301.
- Pratt, Walter F. (1999). The Supreme Court of Edward Douglas White, 1910-1921. Columbia, SC: University of South Carolina Press. ISBN 978-1-57003-309-4.
- Pratt, Walter F. "The American Constitution and the People Who Made It". Amazon. Amazon audiobook.

=== Articles ===
- Pratt, Walter F. (1986). "The Struggle For Judicial Independence in Antebellum North Carolina: The Story of Two Judges". Law and History Review. 4 (1): 129–160. doi:10.2307/743717. JSTOR 743717. S2CID 145609118.

=== Book reviews ===
- Pratt, Walter F. (2013). "Book Review of: Signposts: New Directions in Southern Legal History". Law and Politics Book Review, Sponsored by the Law and Courts Section of the American Political Science Association.
- Pratt, Walter F. (June 1, 2010). "Book review of: Judge Richard S. Arnold: A Legacy of Justice on the Federal Bench. By Polly J. Price". Journal of American History. 97 (1): 226. doi:10.2307/jahist/97.1.226.
