= 1913 United States Senate election in Georgia =

1913 United States Senate election in Georgia (Class 2)
- July 15, 1913
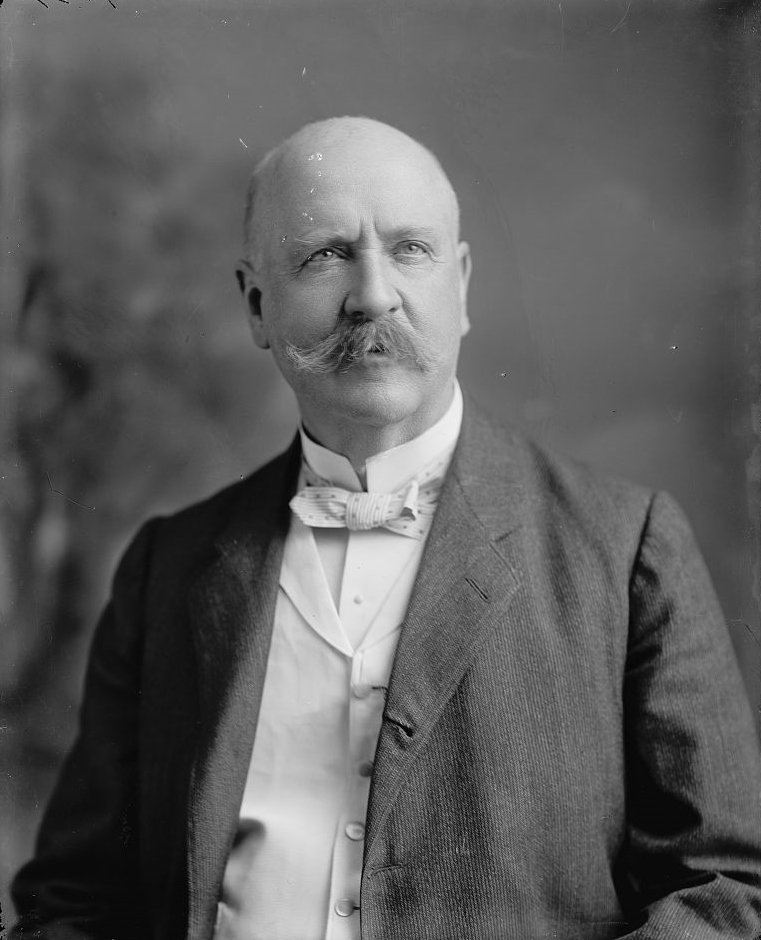
Nominee	Augustus Octavius Bacon
Party	Democratic
Percentage	Unopposed
U.S. senator before election
Augustus Octavius Bacon
Democratic
Elected U.S. senator
Augustus Octavius Bacon
Democratic

The first election under the Seventeenth Amendment to the United States Constitution was a late election held on July 15, 1913. The election was late because two of the candidates were hospitalized due to illness and could not campaign as required.

Augustus Octavius Bacon was first elected by the Georgia General Assembly in 1894. His most recent term had ended on March 3, but the legislature had failed to elect a successor. The Governor of Georgia then appointed Bacon to begin the term starting March 4.

Bacon was re-elected in this late election, running unopposed. This was despite the General Assembly not taking action to ratify the constitutional amendment.

He would serve only until his death on February 14, 1914, leading to another interim appointment and eventual special election.

== See also ==
- 1912 and 1913 United States Senate elections
