= Rochelle C. Dreyfuss =

American attorney

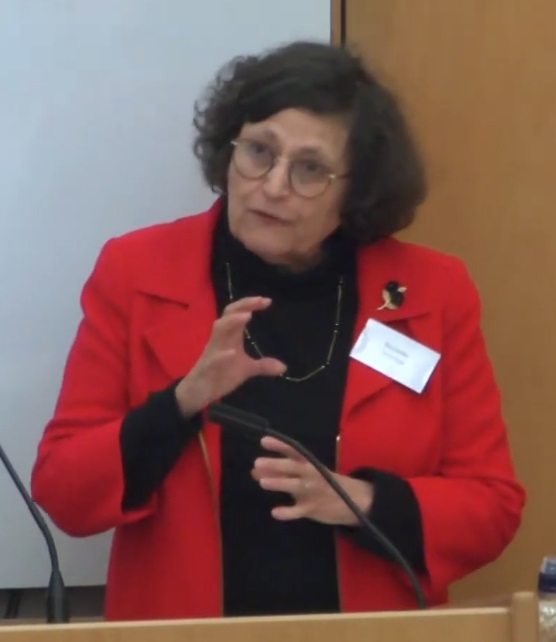
- Dreyfuss in 2020
- Born: Rochelle Cooper; Brooklyn, New York, U.S.
- Education: Wellesley College (BA); University of California, Berkeley (MA); Columbia Law School (JD)
- Occupation: Law professor
- Known for: Expert on patent law and intellectual property
- Spouse: Robert Dreyfuss

Rochelle Cooper Dreyfuss is an American attorney who is the Pauline Newman Professor of Law and codirector of the Engelberg Center on Innovation Law & Policy at New York University School of Law.

== Biography ==
Dreyfuss grew up in Brooklyn, New York. She studied at Wellesley College, where she obtained a B.A. in chemistry, and then received a M.A. from the University of California, Berkeley. After working as a research scientist, she graduated from Columbia Law School in 1981, where she was a James Kent Scholar and served as articles and book review editor of the Columbia Law Review. After law school, Dreyfuss was law clerk for Judge Wilfred Feinberg of the United States Court of Appeals for the Second Circuit and then for Chief Justice Warren Burger of the Supreme Court of the United States during the 1982–1983 term.

In 1983 she joined the faculty of New York University School of Law, and in 1988 was named a full professor. Her research focuses on patent law, copyright and intellectual property. In 1996, she became the director of the Engelberg Center on Innovation Law and Policy, and is currently the co-director. She is co-author of a case book, Intellectual Property-Cases and Materials on Trademark, Copyright and Patent Law, originally published in 1996.

She is a member of the American Law Institute and was a reporter for its 2008 study, "Intellectual Property: Principles Governing Jurisdiction, Choice of Law, and Judgments in Transnational Disputes."

== See also ==
- List of law clerks for the chief justice of the United States

== Select publications ==
=== Books ===
- Dreyfuss, Rochelle C.; Kwall, Roberta Rosenthal; Strandburg, Katherine J. (2004). Intellectual Property-Cases and Materials on Trademark, Copyright and Patent Law (2nd ed.). Foundation Press, University Casebook Series. ISBN 978-1-59941-278-8., and 2010 Supplement ISBN 978-1-59941-801-8 (1st ed. 1996)
- Dreyfuss, Rochelle E.; Pila, Justine (2018). The Oxford Handbook of Intellectual Property Law. Oxford University Press. ISBN 978-0-19-875845-7.

=== Articles ===
- Dreyfuss, Rochelle C. (1995). "Forums of the Future". Brooklyn Law Review. 61: 1.
- Dreyfuss, Rochelle C. (2004). "The ALI Principles on Transnational Intellectual Property Disputes: Why Invite Conflicts?". Brook. J. Int'l L. 30 (3).
- Dreyfuss, Rochelle C.; Frankel, Susy (2015). "From Incentive to Commodity to Asset: How International Law is Reconceptualizing Intellectual Property". Mich. J. Int'l L. 36 (4): 557.
