= Augustus O. Bacon =

American politician (1839–1914)

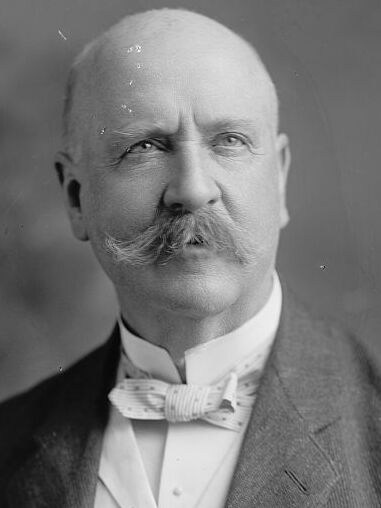

President pro tempore of the United States Senate
- In office August 14, 1911 – February 15, 1913 Serving with Jacob Harold Gallinger, Charles Curtis, Frank B. Brandegee & Henry Cabot Lodge
- Preceded by: William P. Frye
- Succeeded by: Jacob Harold Gallinger

United States Senator from Georgia
- In office March 4, 1895 – February 14, 1914
- Preceded by: Patrick Walsh
- Succeeded by: William S. West

Speaker of the Georgia House of Representatives
- In office 1873-1874 1877-1881
- Preceded by: Joseph B. Cumming (first term); Thomas Hardeman Jr. (second term)
- Succeeded by: Thomas Hardeman Jr. (first term); Louis F. Garrard (second term)

Member of the Georgia House of Representatives
- In office 1871–1886

Personal details
- Born: October 20, 1839 Bryan County, Georgia, U.S.
- Died: February 14, 1914 (aged 74) Washington, D.C., U.S.
- Party: Democratic
- Education: University of Georgia; University of Georgia School of Law

Military service
- Allegiance: Confederate States
- Branch/service: Confederate States Army
- Rank: Captain
- Unit: 9th Georgia Infantry
- Battles/wars: American Civil War

Augustus Octavius Bacon (October 20, 1839 – February 14, 1914) was a Confederate soldier, segregationist, and U.S. politician. A member of the Democratic Party, he served as a U.S. senator from Georgia, becoming the first senator to be directly elected after the ratification of the Seventeenth Amendment, and rose to the position of president pro tempore of the United States Senate. Controversy arose during the American Civil Rights Movement over a provision in his will that created a racially segregated park in his hometown of Macon, which led to two U.S. Supreme Court decisions. He was a slave owner.

== Early life and education ==
Bacon was born in Bryan County, Georgia, on October 20, 1839. He graduated in 1859 from the University of Georgia (UGA) in Athens, Georgia, and from the University of Georgia School of Law in its inaugural class of graduates in 1860. While at UGA, he was a member of the Phi Kappa Literary Society.

== Career ==
=== American Civil War ===
He was a soldier in the army of the Confederate States of America during the American Civil War.

=== Georgia House of Representatives ===
Following the end of the war, he served in the Georgia State House of Representatives from 1871 to 1886, for much of that time as House speaker. He made his home in Macon.

=== U.S. Senate ===
Bacon was elected as one of Georgia's United States senators in 1894 and was reelected to three subsequent terms. Bacon held several committee chairmanships (Committee on Engrossed Bills, Committee on Private Land Claims, Committee on Foreign Relations). He considered himself an Anglophile, once remarking that "all the blood in me comes from English ancestors," but he did not want America to become an imperial power along the same lines as the United Kingdom; he opposed the Spanish–American War and the subsequent occupation of the Philippines on those grounds.

He served as one of several alternating presidents pro tempore of the United States Senate during the 62nd Congress (1911 to 1913), as part of a compromise under which Bacon and four senators from the Republican majority rotated in the office because no single candidate in either party was able to secure a majority vote.

While in the Senate, Bacon was one of a number of members of Congress who tried to get "better" streets in Washington, D.C., named after their home states. Although most of these efforts failed, in 1908 Bacon succeeded in having Brightwood Avenue (or Brookeville Pike) renamed Georgia Avenue. The old Georgia Avenue became Potomac Avenue.

== Death ==
Bacon died of a coronary occlusion on February 14, 1914, in Washington, D.C., at the age of 74. He was buried at Rose Hill Cemetery in Macon, Georgia.

== Legacy ==
After his death, Senator Bacon's 1911 will established a "whites only" park in Macon which was to be held in trust by the city. During the Civil Rights Movement, the use of the park, known as Baconsfield Park, was the subject of two related Supreme Court cases.

The first, Evans v. Newton, was decided in 1966. The Court held that the use of the park for "whites only" was invalid under the Fourteenth Amendment Equal Protection Clause. Because the park was held in trust by a public entity, the Court held that it could not exclude non-white persons. Although the city tried to maintain the segregationist intentions of Senator Bacon by transferring the trust to private trustees, Justice Douglas’ majority opinion explained that a park is public in nature and may not exclude non-white persons from using the park for recreation.

A subsequent Supreme Court case, Evans v. Abney, was decided in 1970. After the Court held that Baconsfield Park was unable to perform a segregationist function, the state court held that "Senator Bacon's intention to provide a park for whites only had become impossible to fulfill and that accordingly the trust had failed and the parkland and other trust property had reverted by operation of Georgia law to the heirs of the Senator." The decision involved the doctrine of cy pres, and it was necessary for the court to determine Senator Bacon's probable intention in the matter. The Court concluded that, if Senator Bacon had been able to know that his objective was impossible or illegal, he would have preferred that the land revert to his heirs. The Supreme Court of the United States affirmed the decision of the Supreme Court of Georgia, holding that refusing to apply the doctrine of cy pres did not violate the Fourteenth Amendment to the United States Constitution. Bacon's heirs then sold the property to private developers, who converted the land near North Avenue and Nottingham Drive to commercial use.

Bacon County, Georgia, established shortly after his death in 1914, is named in his honor.

== See also ==
- List of members of the United States Congress who died in office (1900–1949)
- List of speakers of the Georgia House of Representatives

Party political offices
First	Democratic nominee for U.S. Senator from Georgia (Class 2); 1913	Succeeded by Thomas W. Hardwick
U.S. Senate
Preceded by Patrick Walsh	U.S. senator (Class 2) from Georgia; March 4, 1895 – February 14, 1914	Succeeded by William S. West
Political offices
Preceded by William P. Frye	President pro tempore of the United States Senate; 1911–1913	Succeeded by James P. Clarke
