= Marc A. Franklin =

American lawyer (1932–2020)

- Born: March 9, 1932; Brooklyn, New York, U.S.
- Died: July 5, 2020 (aged 88); Portland, Oregon, U.S.
- Education: Cornell University (BA); Cornell Law School (LLB)
- Occupation: Law professor
- Known for: Expert on media law

Marc A. Franklin (March 9, 1932 – July 5, 2020) was an American lawyer and pioneer in the field of mass media law and regulation, and he was the Frederick I. Richman Professor of Law, emeritus at Stanford Law School. He was author of a case book on mass media law and the lead co-author of one on torts.

== Education and clerkships ==
In 1953, Franklin was graduated from Cornell University. He received a J.D. from Cornell Law School in 1956, where he was editor-in-chief of the Cornell Law Quarterly. After graduation, he clerked for Judge Carroll C. Hincks of the United States Court of Appeals for the Second Circuit. He then clerked for Chief Justice Earl Warren of the U.S. Supreme Court from 1958 to 1959.

== Personal life ==
In 1960, Franklin married Ruth Enid Korzenik (December 21, 1935 – December 18, 2000), a journalist and art curator, and had a son and daughter. In 1999, Marc and Ruth Franklin donated part of their African and Pacific art collection to the Iris & B. Gerald Cantor Center for Visual Arts at Stanford University. The couple began to collect tribal art when Franklin taught law at Columbia University in 1960. Franklin died in his sleep on July 5, 2020.

== See also ==
- List of law clerks for the chief justice of the United States
