= Audrey J. Anderson =

American attorney

- Education: Northwestern University (BA); University of Michigan Law School (JD)
- Occupations: University administrator, lawyer
- Known for: Expert on education and health law
- Spouse: Richard M. Rosenthal

Audrey J. Anderson is an American attorney specializing in education and health law who was the vice chancellor, general counsel and university secretary for Vanderbilt University from 2013 to 2018. She currently serves as an adjunct professor of law at Vanderbilt University Law School.

== Biography ==
Anderson grew up in Minnesota. She studied at Northwestern University, where she received a B.A. in economics in 1985. She attended the University of Michigan School of Law, serving as an editor of the Michigan Law Review, graduating Order of the Coif with a J.D. in 1990. After law school, she clerked for Judge Harold H. Greene of the United States District Court for the District of Columbia in 1990-1991, and for Chief Justice of the United States Supreme Court William H. Rehnquist in 1991-1992. Following her clerkships, she practiced law in Washington, D.C. as an associate and then partner at Hogan & Hartson (now Hogan Lovells), where she worked on constitutional and disability law. In 2006, Anderson represented the Seattle Public Schools in Parents Involved in Community Schools v. Seattle School District No. 1. In 2006 and 2007, Anderson taught as an adjunct law professor of the American University Washington College of Law.

In 2009, Anderson joined the legal staff of the United States Department of Homeland Security, and from September 2011 to March 2013 she served as its Deputy General Counsel, reporting to General Counsel Ivan K. Fong.

In 2013, she was named General Counsel of Vanderbilt. In that role, she provided university leaders advice on intellectual property, personnel issues, and contracts. She also managed the university's litigation and gave legal advice to Vanderbilt University Medical Center. In July 2018, she announced her retirement from her academic posts. In 2024, Anderson began leading Office of General Counsel at Dartmouth on an interim basis.

== Personal life ==
Anderson is married to Richard M. Rosenthal, her law school classmate, who is an educator.

== See also ==
- List of law clerks for the chief justice of the United States

== Select articles ==
- Anderson, Audrey J. (1989). "Corporate Life after Death: CERCLA Preemption of State Corporate Dissolution Law". Michigan Law Review. 88 (1). University of Michigan Law School: 131–168. doi:10.2307/1289139. JSTOR 1289139.
