= Trinsey v. Pennsylvania =

1991 US court case about special elections

- Court: United States Court of Appeals for the Third Circuit
- Decided: August 6, 1991
- Citations: 941 F.2d 224; 60 USLW 2129

Court membership
- Judges sitting: Dolores Sloviter, Morton Ira Greenberg, Collins J. Seitz

Case opinions
- Majority: Sloviter, joined by a unanimous court

Trinsey v. Pennsylvania, 941 F.2d 224 (3d Cir. 1991), was a case decided by the United States Court of Appeals for the Third Circuit that confirmed the validity of special elections held without a primary under the Fourteenth and Seventeenth Amendments to the United States Constitution. The case came about due to the death of H. John Heinz III, one of the U.S. senators from Pennsylvania, in a plane crash on April 4, 1991. Under the Seventeenth Amendment, state legislatures may give the Governor the power to appoint officials to fill temporarily vacant Senate seats until a special election can be held, and Pennsylvanian law contained a statute executing this and requiring no primaries for the special election. Instead, both the Democrats and Republicans would each internally select their candidates. John S. Trinsey Jr., a voter and potential candidate, asked the United States District Court for the Eastern District of Pennsylvania to declare the statute unconstitutional as a violation on the Fourteenth and Seventeenth amendments, because the lack of a primary removed his right to properly vote for candidates and delegated that power to political parties.

After deciding that the statute's subject matter necessitated the strict scrutiny approach, the District Court decided on June 10, 1991 that it was an unconstitutional violation of the right to vote for and select Senate candidates. This decision was appealed to the Court of Appeals for the Third Circuit, who decided against the use of the strict scrutiny approach and, in its absence, ruled that the statute was not a violation of the Fourteenth and Seventeenth Amendments. Academics have been critical of both the decision reached and the approach used, with one suggesting that the "substantial state interests" test used in Valenti v. Rockefeller (1968) would be more appropriate.

== Background ==
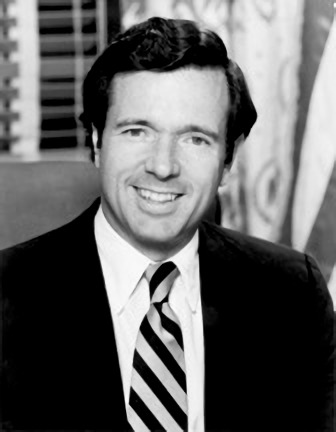
Senator H. John Heinz III, whose death and subsequent replacement led to Trinsey v. Pennsylvania

On April 4, 1991 H. John Heinz III, one of the U.S. senators from Pennsylvania, was killed when his chartered plane collided with a helicopter inspecting its landing gear. Under the Seventeenth Amendment to the United States Constitution, the legislature of each state has the power to permit the governor to fill the vacant seat until a special election can be held. In Pennsylvania, this power had been delegated, and Governor Robert P. Casey signed a writ on May 13, 1991, declaring November 5 the date for a special election and temporarily appointing Harris Wofford to fill Heinz's now-vacant seat. Under Pennsylvanian law, there was no need for a primary in such a situation; instead, both the Democrats and Republicans would each internally select their candidate, who would run in the special election. John S. Trinsey Jr., a member of the Pennsylvanian electorate and potential candidate, challenged the constitutionality of this law, claiming that it violated his rights under the Fourteenth and Seventeenth Amendments.

Trinsey argued that, by failing to allow for primaries, the state legislation prevented him from getting to select a candidate of his choice, and that this violated the Fourteenth Amendment; the terms of the statute (and absence of a requirement for primaries) also allegedly infringed the rights of the electorate under the Seventeenth Amendment, which required the selection of Senators by popular vote; Trinsey's complaint was that the legislation had effectively delegated the power to choose candidates to political parties rather than the electorate. Accordingly, Trinsey filed a motion for a declaratory judgment to state that the statute was unconstitutional, and also requested that Wofford be removed from his seat. Counsel for the Commonwealth of Pennsylvania, joined by the office of the Governor, argued that the constitution did not require the holding of primary elections to fill vacancies, and that the statute "protected valid and compelling state interests in protecting the validity of the electoral process and limiting the term of a [governor-]appointed Senator".

== Judgment ==
The case was first heard in the United States District Court for the Eastern District of Pennsylvania, where, following oral arguments, the judge dismissed both Trinsey's motion to remove Wofford and the Commonwealth's motion to dismiss. On June 10, 1991, however, the District Court declared the statute unconstitutional, stating that it violated both the Fourteenth and Seventeenth Amendments due to the failure to ensure "popular participation" through the use of primary elections. This decision was reached following an analysis of the legislative history of the Seventeenth Amendment and electoral processes; based on this analysis, the court concluded that the Pennsylvanian use of a nomination process before a special election implied a right to vote, which was violated by the lack of a primary and necessitated a strict scrutinising of the legislation. After considering the evidence, the court concluded that "the interests the Commonwealth put forth in support of the statute could not outweigh the infringement of the right to vote", leading to the conclusion that the statute governing special elections was unconstitutional.

With this "the public, press and political parties quickly turned their attention to the case", with the Republican State Committee of Pennsylvania (supported by their Democratic counterparts) and several prominent politicians intervening. They moved to expedite an appeal to the Court of Appeals for the Third Circuit. In a unanimous opinion, the Court of Appeals (consisting of Sloviter, Greenberg and Seitz) confirmed that there was no restriction of any fundamental right, and therefore that the strict scrutiny process did not need to be applied. In the absence of this process, they held that the Seventeenth Amendment did not require primary elections to fill vacancies, and more broadly gave state legislatures wide discretion as to how to hold elections; as such, the statute did not violate the constitution. In December 1991 the Supreme Court denied a writ of certiorari, presumably because the special election had already taken place in November and the issue was thus moot.

== Significance ==
Laura E. Little, writing in the Temple Law Review, notes the dearth of guidance for either the District Court or Court of Appeals in Trinsey, with no "explicit direction and no direct precedent" from either the constitutional provisions or prior case law to rely on. In the absence of guidance, the Court of Appeals took a narrow view of the issues, something she criticises. Under Pennsylvanian law, primaries are mandatory in all other elections, and in her opinion the lack of a primary in this case should have been judged to be a violation of Trinsey's fundamental rights. Combined with the purpose of the Seventeenth Amendment—to ensure direct election—this should have led to the application of the strict scrutiny test, and the decision that the statute governing special elections was unconstitutional. Kevin M. Gold instead suggests that the test used in Valenti v. Rockefeller, an analogous decision over the validity of New York state electoral law. In Valenti, the judiciary applied the "substantial state interests" test, which involves simply looking at whether the statute in question furthers the interests of the states, who under the Seventeenth Amendment are given some discretion as to the electoral process they use.

== Bibliography ==
- Gold, Kevin M. (1992). "Trinsey v. Pennsylvania: State Discretion to Regulate United States Senate Vacancy". Widener Journal of Law and Public Policy. 2 (1). Widener University School of Law. ISSN 1064-5012.
- Little, Laura E. (1991). "An Excursion into the Uncharted Waters". Temple Law Review. 64 (3). Temple Law School. ISSN 0899-8086.
- Novakovic, Michael B. (1992). "Constitutional Law: Filling Senate Vacancies". Villanova Law Review. 37 (1). Villanova University School of Law. ISSN 0042-6229.
- Vile, John R. (2010). A companion to the United States Constitution and its amendments (5th ed.). ABC-CLIO. ISBN 978-0-313-38008-2.
