= Ripley–Union–Lewis–Huntington High School =

Ripley-Union-Lewis-Huntington High School
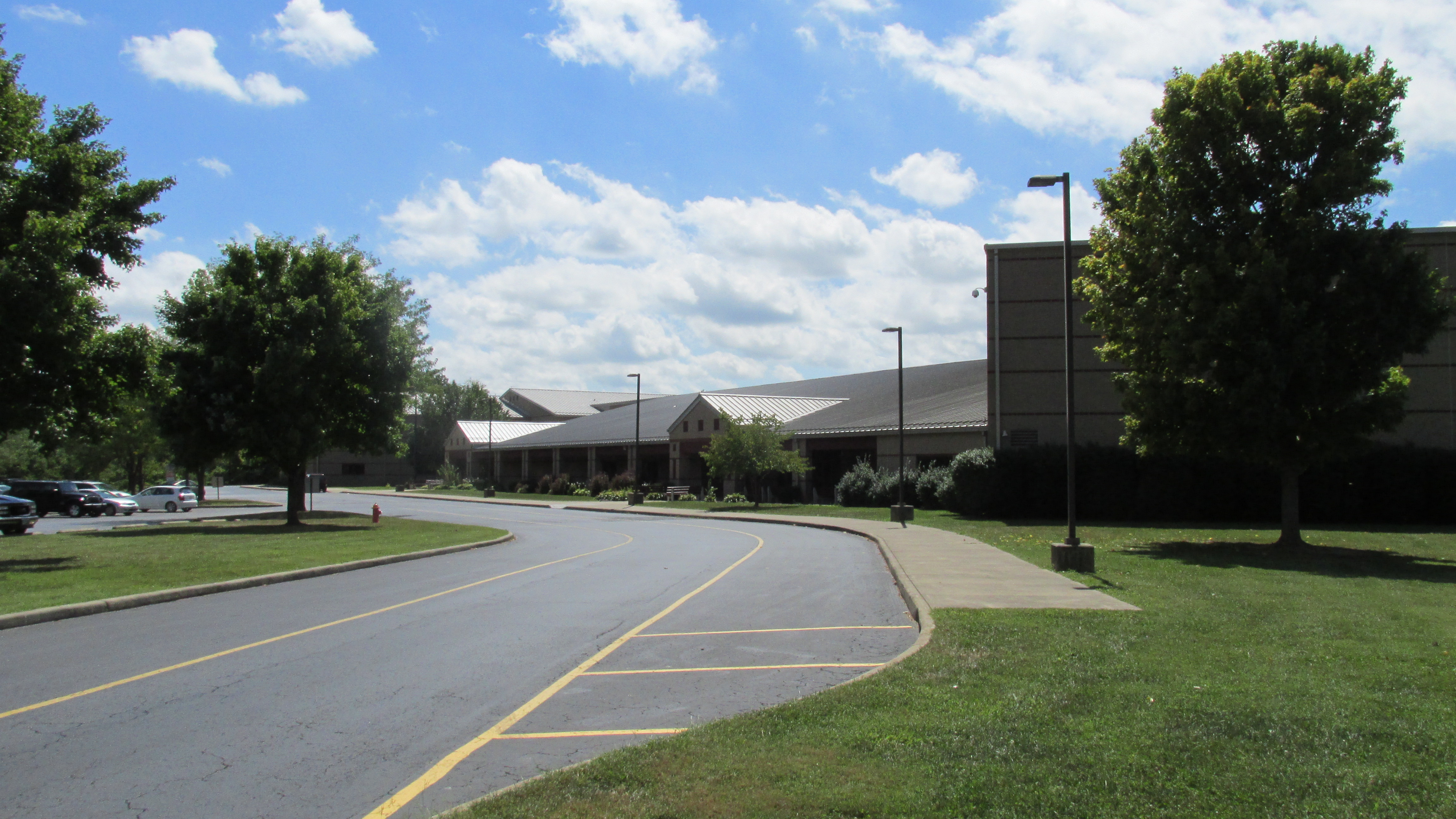

Location
- 1317 South Second Street; Ripley, (Brown County), Ohio 45167; United States; 38°43′25″N 83°49′56″W

Information
- Type: Public, coeducational high school, middle school, secondary school
- Superintendent: James Wilkins
- Principal: Chris Young
- Teaching staff: 23.00 (FTE)
- Grades: 7-12
- Student to teacher ratio: 10.22
- Colors: Blue and white
- Athletics conference: Southern Hills Athletic League
- Team name: Blue Jays
- Accreditation: North Central Association of Colleges and Schools
- Website: www.rulh.us/highschool_home.aspx

Ripley-Union-Lewis-Huntington High School is a public high school in Ripley, Ohio, United States. It is the only high school in the Ripley-Union-Lewis-Huntington School District. During the 2023–24 school year, 235 students were enrolled.

== Athletics ==
See also: Ohio High School Athletic Association and Ohio High School Athletic Conferences.

The school's mascot is the blue jay.
