= Earl E. Pollock =

American lawyer

- Born: 1928; Nebraska
- Died: October 15, 2023 (aged 94–95)
- Education: University of Minnesota (BA) Northwestern University (JD)
- Occupation: Lawyer
- Years active: 1953-1992
- Spouse: Betty Rose Sokol (m. 1951)
- Children: 3

Earl E. Pollock (1928 – October 15, 2023) was an American lawyer. He is best known for his contributions to the United States Supreme Court written opinion for the landmark case of Brown v. Board of Education.

== Early life and education ==
Earl E. Pollock was born on 1928 in Nebraska to Herman and Della Pollock, immigrants from Russia. He grew up in Sioux City, Iowa, where he showed his skill in debate, and won a national oratory competition. This is also the time as a teenager that his mother died of a malignant brain tumor, and his older brother was killed in action in France. After graduating from high school at age 16, Pollock continued his education and success in debate at the University of Minnesota. He briefly attended Morningside College, where his debate team went undefeated his sophomore year. He then returned to the University of Minnesota and graduated in 1948. The next year, he moved to Chicago intending to enroll in their University for a graduate program in sociology. He changed his mind after he clerked at a law office, deciding to continue the work as a career. He enrolled into Northwestern University School of Law, where he became the editor in chief of the Northwestern Law Review, and graduated first in his class. It was during his time there that he met his wife, Betty Rose Sokol, who he married on September 8, 1951. They would have three children together.

== Supreme Court clerk ==
In the summer of 1953, Pollock moved to Washington D.C. and became a clerk for Chief Justice of the United States Supreme Court Fred M. Vinson. Pollock would turn out to be Vinson's last selected clerk, as he died just a few months later. Pollock worked briefly as Associate Justice Hugo Black's clerk, and was searching for jobs in D.C., until the new Chief Justice, Earl Warren, decided to accept all of Vinson's clerks as his own.

One of the first opinions that Pollock worked on under Warren was Brown v. Board of Education. First argued under Vinson's tenure, but re-argued for Warren, it was a collection of cases that dealt with whether racial segregation of students violated the equal protection clause of the Fourteenth Amendment. After Chief Justice Warren secured a majority in siding with Brown, Warren then worked on a handwritten first draft of the decision. Once Warren was done with the eight-page outline, on April 29, 1954, he handed it over to Pollock for revising. Pollock was given the instructions of keeping the decision short and simple, so that the millions of non-lawyers that this case would affect would be able to read and understand it. Pollock took the draft home over the weekend and improved the legal reasoning of the case. Pollock's biggest contribution was to one of Brown's cases, Bolling v. Sharpe, which dealt with school segregation in D.C., not the States. That meant the fourteenth amendment's equal protection clause could not apply to it, unlike the other cases. Pollock was able to propose to Warren that the Fifth Amendment's barring of the federal government depriving anyone of "Life, liberty, or property without due process" could stop school segregation in D.C., logic which Warren readily accepted, and the other clerks began to write an opinion for Boiling around. After nine days of working on it, Pollock handed in the revised opinion for Brown on May 8. Pollock watched as the unanimous decision, with only minor changes from what he wrote, was announced on May 17, striking down school segregation. Pollock continued as Warren's clerk until the end of the 1955 term.

== Career and retirement ==
Pollock briefly worked as a trial attorney for the United States Department of Justice Antitrust Division, and then served as one of Solicitor General J. Lee Rankin's assistant attorneys. In 1959, Pollock became a partner in the Chicago-based international law firm Sonnenschein, Nath & Rosenthal. He successfully argued multiple cases in front of the Supreme Court, and served as the American Bar Association's chairman of the anti-trust division from 1979 to 1980. He retired in 1992, and later moved to Sarasota, Florida. In 2004, he became a member of the Supreme Court historical society, and was elected president of the Florida West Coast Symphony. He died on October 15, 2023, at the age of 95.

== Bibliography ==
- Pollock, Earl (2008). The Supreme Court and American Democracy: Case Studies on Judicial Review and Public Policy. Greenwood Press. ISBN 978-0313365256.
- Pollock, Earl (2012). Race and the Supreme Court: Defining Equality. Peppertree Press. ISBN 978-1614931034.
