= Seventeenth Amendment to the United States Constitution =

1913 amendment establishing the direct election of senators

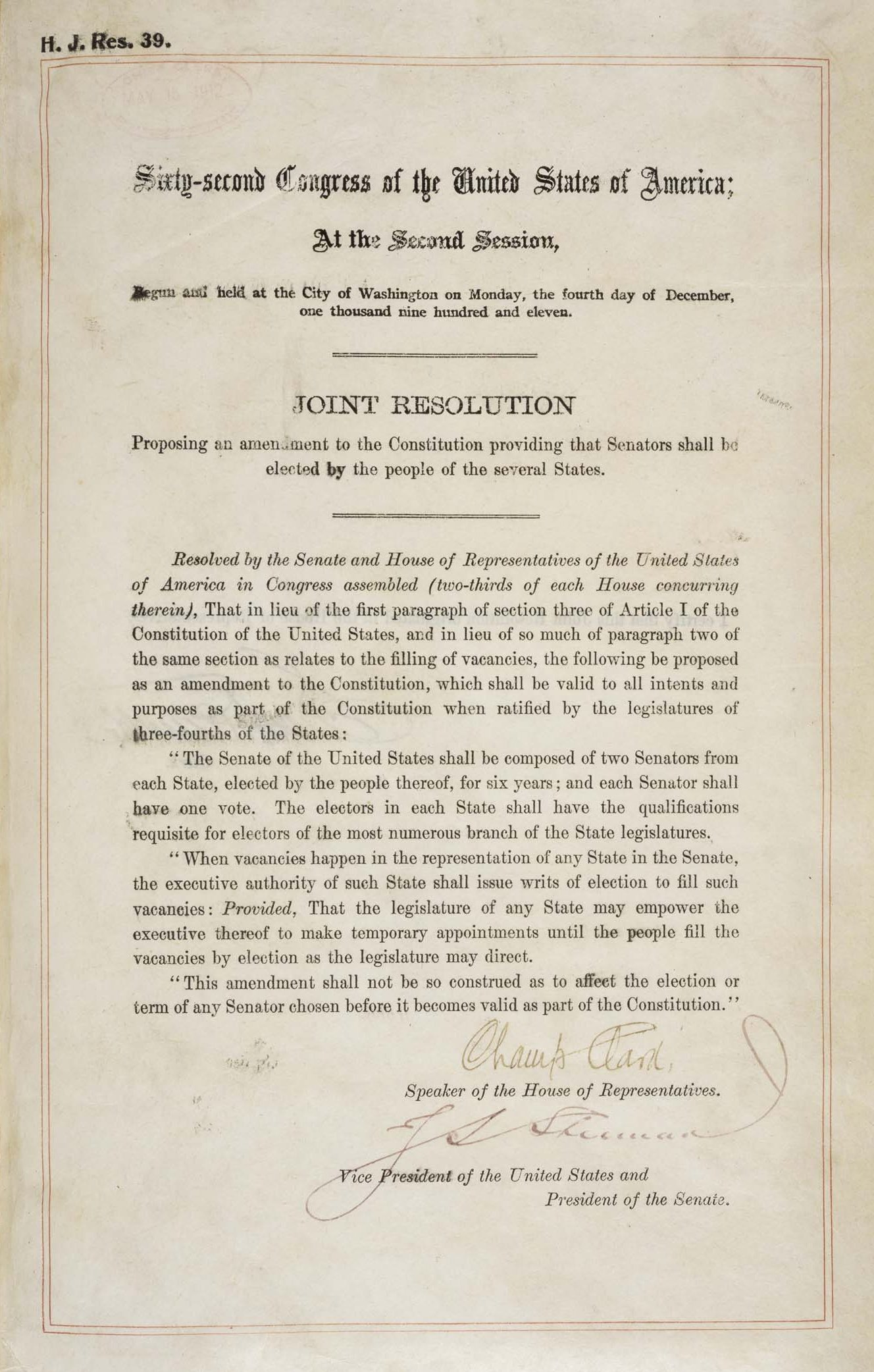
The Seventeenth Amendment in the National Archives

The Seventeenth Amendment (Amendment XVII) to the United States Constitution established the direct election of United States senators in each state. The amendment supersedes Article I, Section 3, Clauses 1 and 2 of the Constitution, under which senators were appointed by state legislatures. It also alters the procedure for filling vacancies in the Senate, allowing for state legislatures to permit their governors to make temporary appointments until a special election can be held.

The amendment was proposed by the 62nd Congress in 1912 and became part of the Constitution upon ratification by three quarters (36) of the state legislatures on April 8, 1913. Sitting senators were not affected until their existing terms expired. The transition began with two special elections in Georgia and in Maryland, then in earnest with the November 1914 election; it was complete on March 4, 1919, when the senators chosen in the November 1918 election took office.

== Text ==
The Senate of the United States shall be composed of two Senators from each State, elected by the people thereof, for six years; and each Senator shall have one vote. The electors in each State shall have the qualifications requisite for electors of the most numerous branch of the State legislatures.

When vacancies happen in the representation of any State in the Senate, the executive authority of such State shall issue writs of election to fill such vacancies: Provided, That the legislature of any State may empower the executive thereof to make temporary appointments until the people fill the vacancies by election as the legislature may direct.

This amendment shall not be so construed as to affect the election or term of any Senator chosen before it becomes valid as part of the Constitution.

== Background ==
=== Original composition ===
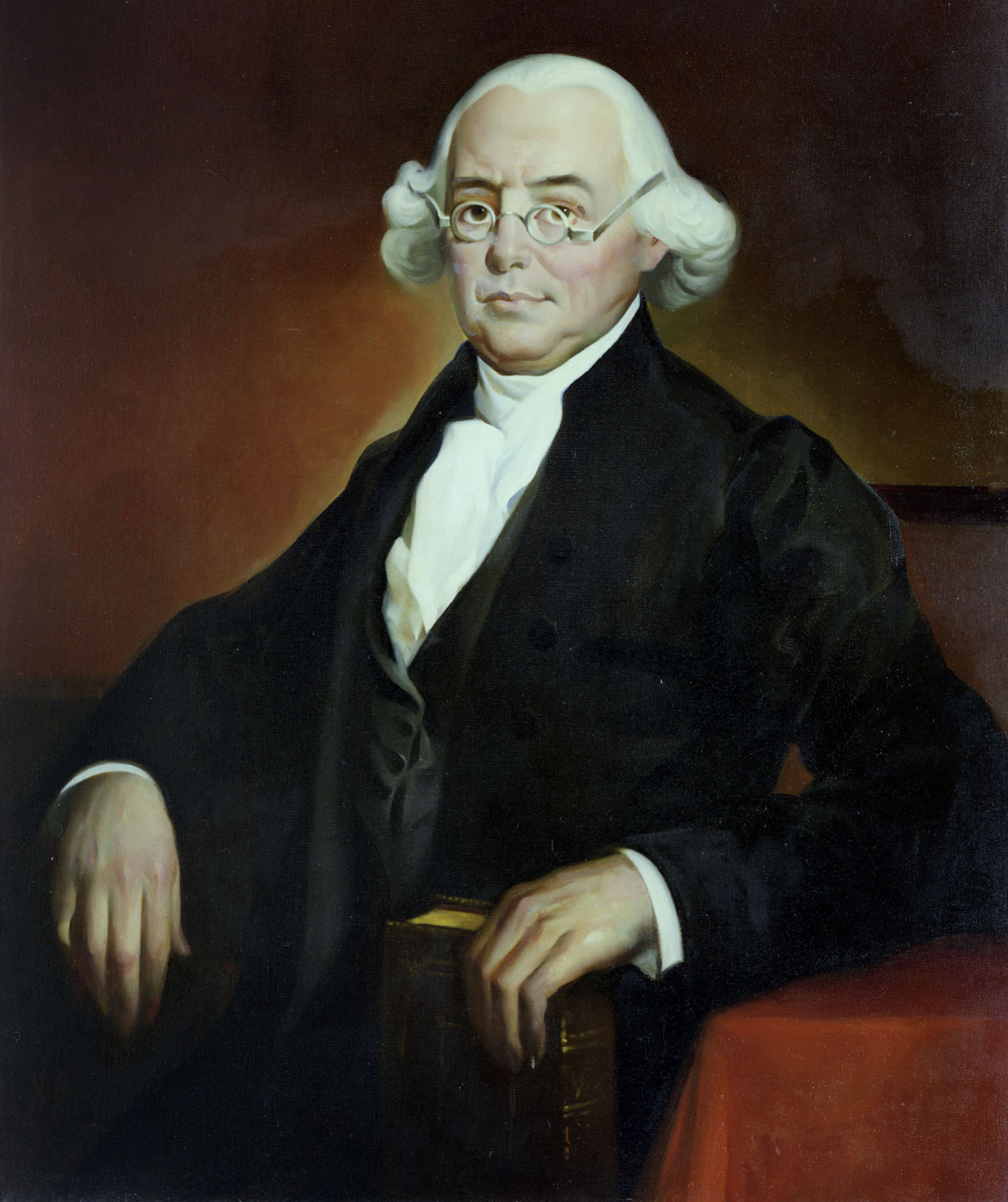
James Wilson was the only member of the Constitutional Convention who supported electing the United States Senate by popular vote.

Originally, under Article I, Section 3, Clauses 1 and 2 of the Constitution, each state legislature chose its state's senators for a six-year term. Each state, regardless of size, is entitled to two senators as part of the Connecticut Compromise between the small and large states. This contrasted with the House of Representatives, a body elected by popular vote, and was described as an uncontroversial decision; at the time, James Wilson was the sole advocate of popularly electing the Senate, but his proposal was defeated 10–1. There were many advantages to the original method of electing senators. Prior to the Constitution, a federal body was one where states effectively formed nothing more than permanent treaties, with citizens retaining their loyalty to their original state. However, under the new Constitution, the federal government was granted substantially more power than before. Having the state legislatures elect the senators reassured anti-federalists that there would be some protection against the federal government's swallowing up states and their powers, and providing a check on the power of the federal government.

Additionally, the longer terms and avoidance of popular election turned the Senate into a body that could counter the populism of the House. While the representatives operated in a two-year direct election cycle, making them frequently accountable to their constituents, the senators could afford to "take a more detached view of issues coming before Congress". State legislatures retained the theoretical right to "instruct" their senators to vote for or against proposals, thus giving the states both direct and indirect representation in the federal government. The Senate was part of a formal bicameralism, with the members of the Senate and House responsible to completely distinct constituencies; this helped defeat the problem of the federal government being subject to "special interests". Members of the Constitutional Convention considered the Senate to be parallel to the British House of Lords as an "upper house", containing the "better men" of society, but different as they would be conscientiously chosen by the upper houses of state legislatures for fixed terms, and not merely inherited for life. It was hoped they would provide abler deliberation and greater stability than the House of Representatives due to the senators' status.

=== Issues ===
An illustration by George Frederick Keller published in The Wasp depicting the election of John Franklin Miller to the U.S. Senate, January 22, 1881

Those in favor of popular elections for senators believed two primary problems were caused by the original provisions: legislative corruption and electoral deadlocks. There was a sense that senatorial elections were "bought and sold", changing hands for favors and sums of money rather than because of the competence of the candidate. Between 1857 and 1900, the Senate investigated three elections over corruption. In 1900, for example, William A. Clark resigned after a Senate committee concluded that he had bought votes in the Montana legislature. But conservative analysts Jay Bybee and Todd Zywicki say this concern was largely unfounded; there was a "dearth of hard information" on the subject. In more than a century of legislative elections of U.S. senators, only ten cases were contested for allegations of impropriety.

Electoral deadlocks were another issue. Because state legislatures were charged with deciding whom to appoint as senators, the system relied on their ability to agree. Some states could not, and thus delayed sending senators to Congress; in a few cases, the system broke down to the point where states completely lacked representation in the Senate. Deadlocks started to become an issue in the 1850s, with a deadlocked Indiana legislature allowing a Senate seat to sit vacant for two years. The tipping point came in 1865 with the election of John P. Stockton (D-NJ), which happened after the New Jersey legislature changed its rules regarding the definition of a quorum and was thus by plurality instead of by absolute majority.

In 1866, Congress acted to standardize a two-step process for Senate elections. In the first step, each chamber of the state legislature would meet separately to vote. The following day, the chambers would meet in "joint assembly" to assess the results, and if a majority in both chambers had voted for the same person, they would be elected. If not, the joint assembly would vote for a senator, with each member receiving a vote. If no person received a majority, the joint assembly was required to keep convening every day to take at least one vote until a senator was elected. Nevertheless, between 1891 and 1905, 46 elections were deadlocked across 20 states; in one extreme example, a Senate seat for Delaware went unfilled from 1899 until 1903. The business of holding elections also caused great disruption in the state legislatures, with a full third of the Oregon House of Representatives choosing not to swear the oath of office in 1897 due to a dispute over an open Senate seat. The result was that Oregon's legislature was unable to pass legislation that year.

Zywicki again argues that this was not a serious issue. Deadlocks were a problem, but they were the exception rather than the norm; many legislatures did not deadlock over elections at all. Most of those that did in the 19th century were the newly admitted western states, which suffered from "inexperienced legislatures and weak party discipline ... as western legislatures gained experience, deadlocks became less frequent." While Utah suffered from deadlocks in 1897 and 1899, they became what Zywicki refers to as "a good teaching experience", and Utah never again failed to elect senators. Another concern was that when deadlocks occurred, state legislatures were unable to conduct their other normal business; James Christian Ure, writing in the South Texas Law Review, notes that this did not in fact generally occur. In a deadlock situation, state legislatures would deal with the matter by holding "one vote at the beginning of the day—then the legislators would continue with their normal affairs".

Eventually, legislative elections held in a state's Senate election years were perceived to have become so dominated by the business of picking senators that the state's choice for senator distracted the electorate from all other pertinent issues. Senator John H. Mitchell noted that the Senate became the "vital issue" in all legislative campaigns, with the policy stances and qualifications of state legislative candidates ignored by voters who were more interested in the indirect Senate election. To remedy this, some state legislatures created "advisory elections" that served as de facto general elections, allowing legislative campaigns to focus on local issues.

=== Calls for reform ===
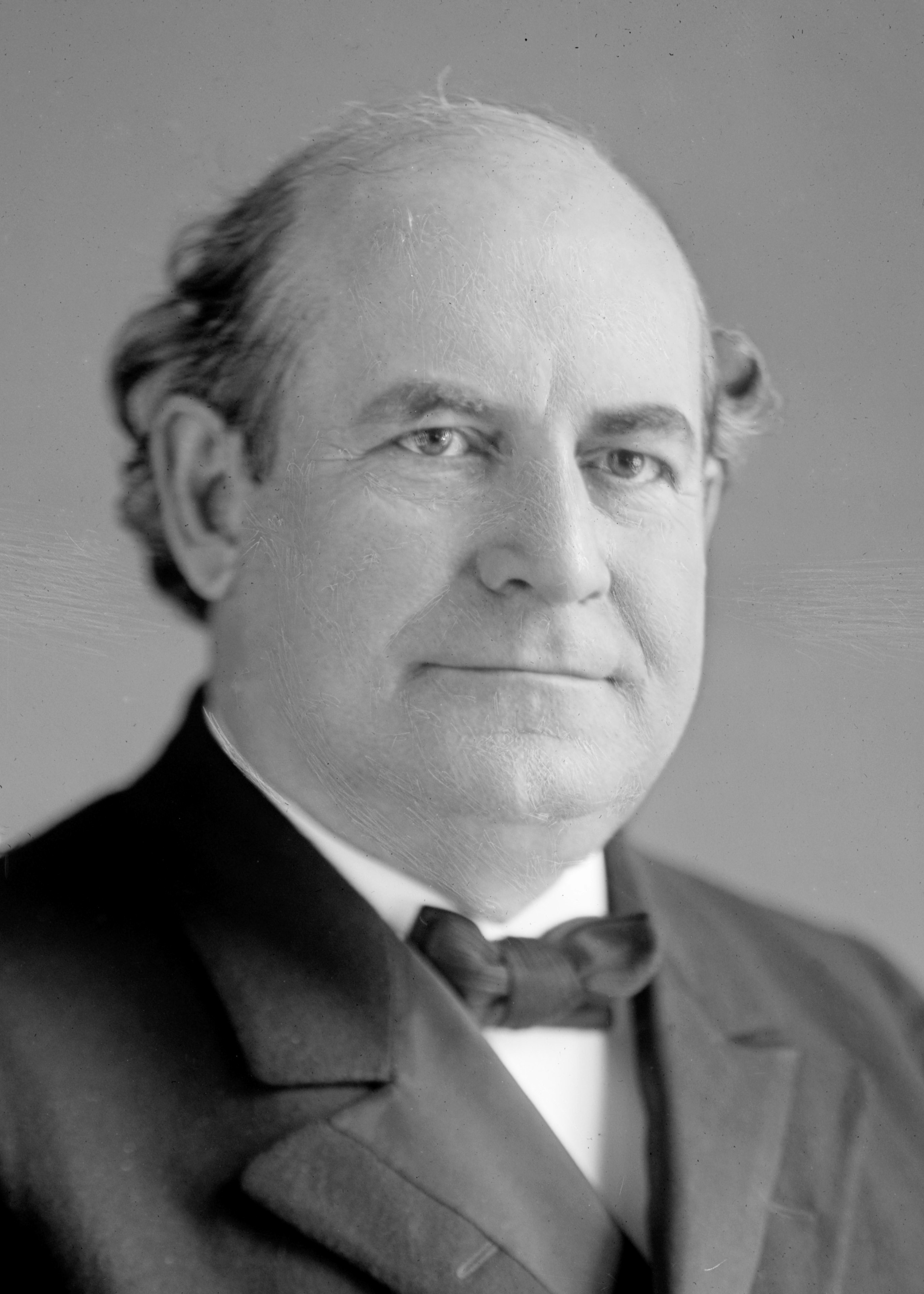
William Jennings Bryan campaigned for the popular election of U.S. senators.

Calls for a constitutional amendment regarding Senate elections started in the early 19th century, with Henry R. Storrs in 1826 proposing an amendment to provide for popular election. Similar amendments were introduced in 1829 and 1855, with the "most prominent" proponent being Andrew Johnson, who raised the issue in 1868 and considered the idea's merits "so palpable" that no additional explanation was necessary. As noted above, in the 1860s, there was a major congressional dispute over the issue, with the House and Senate voting to veto the appointment of John P. Stockton to the Senate due to his approval by a plurality of the New Jersey Legislature rather than a majority. In reaction, the Congress passed a bill in July 1866 that required state legislatures to elect senators by an absolute majority.

By the 1890s, support for the introduction of direct election for the Senate had substantially increased, and reformers worked on two fronts. On the first front, the Populist Party incorporated the direct election of senators into its Omaha Platform, adopted in 1892. In 1908, Oregon passed the first law basing the selection of U.S. senators on a popular vote. Oregon was soon followed by Nebraska. Proponents for popular election noted that ten states already had non-binding primaries for Senate candidates, in which the candidates would be voted on by the public, effectively serving as advisory referendums instructing state legislatures how to vote; reformers campaigned for more states to introduce a similar method.

William Randolph Hearst opened a nationwide popular readership for direct election of U.S. senators in a 1906 series of articles using flamboyant language attacking "The Treason of the Senate" in his Cosmopolitan magazine. David Graham Philips, a muckraker, described Nelson Aldrich of Rhode Island as the principal "traitor" among the "scurvy lot" in control of the Senate by theft, perjury, and bribes corrupting the state legislatures to gain election to the Senate. A few state legislatures began to petition the Congress for direct election of senators. By 1893, the House had the two-thirds vote for just such an amendment. However, when the joint resolution reached the Senate, it failed from neglect, as it did again in 1900, 1904 and 1908; each time the House approved the appropriate resolution, and each time it died in the Senate.

On the second national legislative front, reformers worked toward a constitutional amendment, which was strongly supported in the House of Representatives but initially opposed by the Senate. Bybee notes that the state legislatures, which would lose power if the reforms went through, were supportive of the campaign. By 1910, 31 state legislatures had passed resolutions calling for a constitutional amendment allowing direct election, and in the same year ten Republican senators who were opposed to reform were forced out of their seats, acting as a "wake-up call to the Senate".

Reformers included William Jennings Bryan, while opponents counted respected figures such as Elihu Root and George Frisbie Hoar among their number; Root cared so strongly about the issue that after the passage of the Seventeenth Amendment he refused to stand for re‑election to the Senate. Bryan and the reformers argued for popular election through highlighting flaws they saw within the existing system, specifically corruption and electoral deadlocks, and through arousing populist sentiment. Most important was the populist argument; that there was a need to "Awaken, in the senators ... a more acute sense of responsibility to the people", which it was felt they lacked; election through state legislatures was seen as an anachronism that was out of step with the wishes of the American people, and one that had led to the Senate becoming "a sort of aristocratic body—too far removed from the people, beyond their reach, and with no special interest in their welfare". The settlement of the West and continuing absorption of hundreds of thousands of immigrants expanded the sense of "the people".

Hoar replied that "the people" were both a less permanent and a less trusted body than state legislatures, and moving the responsibility for the election of senators to them would see it passing into the hands of a body that "[lasted] but a day" before changing. Other counterarguments were that renowned senators could not have been elected directly and that, since a large number of senators had experience in the House (which was already directly elected), a constitutional amendment would be pointless. The reform was considered by opponents to threaten the rights and independence of the states, who were "sovereign, entitled ... to have a separate branch of Congress ... to which they could send their ambassadors." This was countered by the argument that a change in the mode in which senators were elected would not change their responsibilities.

The Senate freshman class of 1910 brought new hope to the reformers. Fourteen of the thirty newly elected senators had been elected through party primaries, which amounted to popular choice in their states. More than half of the states had some form of primary selection for the Senate. The Senate finally joined the House to submit the Seventeenth Amendment to the states for ratification, nearly ninety years after it first was presented to the Senate in 1826.

By 1912, 239 political parties at both the state and national level had pledged some form of direct election, and 33 states had introduced the use of direct primaries. Twenty-seven states had called for a constitutional convention on the subject, with 31 states needed to reach the threshold; Arizona and New Mexico each achieved statehood that year (bringing the total number of states to 48), and were expected to support the motion. Alabama and Wyoming, already states, had passed resolutions in favor of a convention without formally calling for one.

== Proposal and ratification ==
=== Proposal in Congress ===
In 1911, the House of Representatives passed House Joint Resolution 39 proposing a constitutional amendment for direct election of senators. The original resolution passed by the House contained the following clause:

The times, places, and manner of holding elections for Senators shall be as prescribed in each State by the legislature thereof.

This so-called "race rider" clause would have strengthened the powers of states over senatorial elections and weakened those of Congress by overriding Congress's power to override state laws affecting the manner of senatorial elections.

Since the 1890s, nearly all blacks in the South, and many poor whites, had been disenfranchised by new provisions in state constitutions that were discriminatory in practice. This meant that these millions of people had no political representation, and most of the South was de facto one-party states. The "rider" was intended to enable these states to continue these practices, protected from any federal interference.

When the resolution came before the Senate, Senator Joseph L. Bristow (R-KS) proposed an amendment which eliminated the rider. This amendment was approved by 45 votes to 44 after Vice President James S. Sherman cast a tie-breaking "yea" vote.

The amended resolution was then adopted by a vote of 64 to 24, with four not voting. Nearly a year later, the House accepted the change. The conference report that would become the Seventeenth Amendment was approved by the Senate in a 42 to 36 vote on April 12, 1912, and by the House 238 to 39, with 110 not voting on May 13, 1912.

=== Ratification by the states ===
Original ratifier of amendment Ratified after adoption Rejected amendment No action taken on amendment

Having been passed by Congress, the amendment was sent to the states for ratification and was ratified by:

1. Massachusetts: May 22, 1912
2. Arizona: June 3, 1912
3. Minnesota: June 10, 1912
4. New York: January 15, 1913
5. Kansas: January 17, 1913
6. Oregon: January 23, 1913
7. North Carolina: January 25, 1913
8. California: January 28, 1913
9. Michigan: January 28, 1913
10. Iowa: January 30, 1913
11. Montana: January 30, 1913
12. Idaho: January 31, 1913
13. West Virginia: February 4, 1913
14. Colorado: February 5, 1913
15. Nevada: February 6, 1913
16. Texas: February 7, 1913
17. Washington: February 7, 1913
18. Wyoming: February 8, 1913
19. Arkansas: February 11, 1913
20. Maine: February 11, 1913
21. Illinois: February 13, 1913
22. North Dakota: February 14, 1913
23. Wisconsin: February 18, 1913
24. Indiana: February 19, 1913
25. New Hampshire: February 19, 1913
26. Vermont: February 19, 1913
27. South Dakota: February 19, 1913
28. Oklahoma: February 24, 1913
29. Ohio: February 25, 1913
30. Missouri: March 7, 1913
31. New Mexico: March 13, 1913
32. Nebraska: March 14, 1913
33. New Jersey: March 17, 1913
34. Tennessee: April 1, 1913
35. Pennsylvania: April 2, 1913
36. Connecticut: April 8, 1913
  With 36 states having ratified the Seventeenth Amendment, it was certified by Secretary of State William Jennings Bryan on May 31, 1913, as part of the Constitution. The amendment has subsequently been ratified by:
37. Louisiana: June 11, 1914
38. Alabama: April 11, 2002
39. Delaware: July 1, 2010 (after rejecting the amendment on March 18, 1913)
40. Maryland: April 1, 2012
41. Rhode Island: June 20, 2014

The Utah Legislature rejected the amendment on February 26, 1913. No action on the amendment has been completed by Florida, Georgia, Kentucky, Mississippi, South Carolina, or Virginia. Alaska and Hawaii were not yet states at the time of the amendment's proposal, and therefore ratified the amendment along with the rest of the Constitution as part of joining the Union in 1959.

== Effect ==
The Seventeenth Amendment altered the process for electing United States senators and changed the way vacancies would be filled. Originally, the Constitution required state legislatures to fill Senate vacancies.

According to Judge Bybee, the Seventeenth Amendment had a dramatic impact on the political composition of the U.S. Senate. Before the Supreme Court required "one man, one vote" in Reynolds v. Sims (1964), malapportionment of state legislatures was common. For example, rural counties and cities could be given "equal weight" in the state legislatures, enabling one rural vote to equal 200 city votes. The malapportioned state legislatures would have given the Republicans control of the Senate in the 1916 Senate elections. With direct election, each vote represented equally, the Democrats held their stronghold in the South and offset net Republican gains in the Northeast by picking up new seats in New Mexico, Utah and Wyoming, retaining control of the Senate. Similarly, Bybee believes the Republican Revolution of 1994 would not have happened without direct election of Senators; instead, the Democrats would have controlled 70 seats in the Senate to the Republicans' 30.

The reputation of corrupt and arbitrary state legislatures continued to decline as the Senate joined the House of Representatives in implementing popular reforms. Bybee has argued that the amendment led to complete "ignominy" for state legislatures without the buttress of a state-based check on Congress. In the decades following the Seventeenth Amendment, the federal government was enabled to enact progressive measures. However, Schleiches argues that the separation of state legislatures and the Senate had a beneficial effect on the states, as it led state legislative campaigns to focus on local rather than national issues.

New Deal legislation is another example of expanding federal regulation overruling the state legislatures promoting their local state interests in coal, oil, corn and cotton. Ure agrees, saying that not only is each senator now free to ignore his state's interests, senators "have incentive to use their advice-and-consent powers to install Supreme Court justices who are inclined to increase federal power at the expense of state sovereignty". Over the first half of the 20th century, with a popularly elected Senate confirming nominations, both Republican and Democratic, the Supreme Court began to apply the Bill of Rights to the states, overturning state laws whenever they harmed individual state citizens. It aimed to limit the influence of the wealthy.

=== Filling vacancies ===
The Seventeenth Amendment requires a governor to call a special election to fill vacancies in the Senate. It also allows a state's legislature to permit its governor to make temporary appointments, which last until a special election is held to fill the vacancy. Currently, all but four states (Kentucky, North Dakota, Rhode Island, and Wisconsin) permit such appointments. The Constitution does not set out how the temporary appointee is to be selected.

=== First direct elections to the Senate ===
Oklahoma, admitted to statehood in 1907, chose a senator by legislative election three times: twice in 1907, when admitted, and once in 1908. In 1912, Oklahoma reelected Robert Owen by advisory popular vote.

Oregon held primaries in 1908 in which the parties would run candidates for that position, and the state legislature pledged to choose the winner as the new senator.

New Mexico, admitted to statehood in 1912, chose only its first two senators legislatively. Arizona, admitted to statehood in 1912, chose its first two senators by advisory popular vote. Alaska, and Hawaii, admitted to statehood in 1959, have never chosen a U.S. senator legislatively.

The first election subject to the Seventeenth Amendment was a late election in Georgia held June 15, 1913. Augustus Octavius Bacon was however unopposed.

The first direct elections to the Senate following the Seventeenth Amendment being adopted were:

- In Maryland on November 4, 1913: a class 1 special election due to a vacancy, for a term ending in 1917.
- In Alabama on May 11, 1914: a class 3 special election due to a vacancy, for a term ending in 1915.
- Nationwide in 1914: All 32 class 3 senators, term 1915–1921
- Nationwide in 1916: All 32 class 1 senators, term 1917–1923
- Nationwide in 1918: All 32 class 2 senators, term 1919–1925

=== Court cases and interpretation controversies ===
In Trinsey v. Pennsylvania (1991), the United States Court of Appeals for the Third Circuit was faced with a situation where, following the death of Senator John Heinz of Pennsylvania, Governor Bob Casey had provided for a replacement and for a special election that did not include a primary. A voter and prospective candidate, John S. Trinsey Jr., argued that the lack of a primary violated the Seventeenth Amendment and his right to vote under the Fourteenth Amendment. The Third Circuit rejected these arguments, ruling that the Seventeenth Amendment does not require primaries.

Another subject of analysis is whether statutes restricting the authority of governors to appoint temporary replacements are constitutional. Vikram Amar, writing in the Hastings Constitutional Law Quarterly, claims Wyoming's requirement that its governor fill a senatorial vacancy by nominating a person of the same party as the person who vacated that seat violates the Seventeenth Amendment. This is based on the text of the Seventeenth Amendment, which states that "the legislature of any state may empower the executive thereof to make temporary appointments". The amendment only empowers the legislature to delegate the authority to the governor and, once that authority has been delegated, does not permit the legislature to intervene. The authority is to decide whether the governor shall have the power to appoint temporary senators, not whom the governor may appoint. Sanford Levinson, in his rebuttal to Amar, argues that rather than engaging in a textual interpretation, those examining the meaning of constitutional provisions should interpret them in the fashion that provides the most benefit, and that legislatures' being able to restrict gubernatorial appointment authority provides a substantial benefit to the states.

=== Reform and repeal efforts ===
Notwithstanding controversies over the effects of the Seventeenth Amendment, advocates have emerged to reform or repeal the amendment. At the beginning of President Barack Obama's administration in 2009, four sitting Democratic senators left the Senate for executive branch positions: Obama himself (President), Joe Biden (Vice President), Hillary Clinton (Secretary of State), and Ken Salazar (Secretary of the Interior). Controversies developed about the successor appointments made by Illinois governor Rod Blagojevich and New York governor David Paterson. New interest was aroused in abolishing the provision for the Senate appointment by the governor. Accordingly, Senator Russ Feingold of Wisconsin and Representative David Dreier of California proposed an amendment to remove this power; senators John McCain and Dick Durbin became co-sponsors, as did Representative John Conyers.

Some members of the Tea Party movement argued for repealing the Seventeenth Amendment entirely, claiming it would protect states' rights and reduce the power of the federal government. On March 2, 2016, the Utah legislature approved Senate Joint Resolution No. 2 asking Congress to offer an amendment to the United States Constitution that would repeal the Seventeenth Amendment. As of 2025, no other states had supported such an amendment, and some politicians who had made statements in favor of repealing the amendment had subsequently reversed their position on this.

On July 28, 2017, after Republican senators John McCain, Susan Collins and Lisa Murkowski voted against the Health Care Freedom Act, which would have repealed the Affordable Care Act, former Arkansas governor Mike Huckabee endorsed the repeal of the Seventeenth Amendment. He claimed that senators chosen by state legislatures "will work for their states and respect [the Tenth Amendment]", and also that direct election of senators is a major cause of the "swamp".

In September 2020, Senator Ben Sasse of Nebraska endorsed the repeal of the Seventeenth Amendment in a Wall Street Journal opinion piece.

On June 25, 2026, Representative Keith Self of Texas introduced a resolution to repeal the Seventeenth Amendment. The resolution was co-sponsored by eight other House Republicans: Eric Burlison, Andrew Clyde, Paul Gosar, Andy Harris, Scott Perry, Clay Higgins, Sheri Biggs, and Michael Cloud. Self argued "The current system has given us six-year politicians more focused on national ambitions and the institution of the U.S. Senate than on the states they serve."

== Opinion polling ==
A November 2013 YouGov–Huffington Post survey of 1,000 adults found that 71% preferred electing senators by popular vote, while 11% preferred election by state legislatures and 18% were unsure. Asked directly about the Seventeenth Amendment, 64% favored retaining it, 16% favored repeal, and 21% were unsure.

A September 2019 C-SPAN–Ipsos survey of 1,039 adults found that 19% agreed that the Seventeenth Amendment should be repealed, 37% disagreed, 43% neither agreed nor disagreed, and 1% did not answer.

In November 2021, an Axios–Ipsos survey of 1,273 adults found that 15% agreed that the Seventeenth Amendment should be repealed, 46% disagreed, 36% neither agreed nor disagreed. Agreement was 16% among Republicans, 18% among Democrats, and 14% among independents.

== See also ==
- Reform of the Senate

== General and cited references ==
- Amar, Vikram David (2008). "Are Statutes Constraining Gubernatorial Power to Make Temporary Appointments to the United States Senate Constitutional Under the Seventeenth Amendment?". Hastings Constitutional Law Quarterly. 35 (4). University of California, Hastings College of the Law. ISSN 0094-5617. SSRN 1103590.
- Bybee, Jay S. (1997). "Ulysses at the Mast: Democracy, Federalism, and the Sirens' Song of the Seventeenth Amendment". Northwestern University Law Review. 91 (1). Northwestern University School of Law. ISSN 0029-3571.
- Gold, Kevin M. (1992). "Trinsey v. Pennsylvania: State Discretion to Regulate United States Senate Vacancy". Widener Journal of Law and Public Policy. 2 (1). Widener University School of Law. ISSN 1064-5012.
- Haynes, George Henry (1912). Ringwalt, Ralph Curtis (ed.). The Election of Senators. H. Holt.
- Hoebeke, Christopher Hyde (1995). The road to mass democracy: original intent and the Seventeenth Amendment. Transaction Publishers. ISBN 1-56000-217-4.
- Kochan, Donald J. (2003). "State Laws and the Independent Judiciary: An Analysis of the Effects of the Seventeenth Amendment on the Number of Supreme Court Cases Holding State Laws Unconstitutional". Albany Law Review. 66 (1). ISSN 0002-4678. SSRN 907518.
- Levinson, Sanford (2008). "Political Party and Senatorial Succession: A Response to Vikram Amar on How Best to Interpret the Seventeenth Amendment". Hastings Constitutional Law Quarterly. 35 (4). University of California, Hastings College of the Law. ISSN 0094-5617.
- Novakovic, Michael B. (1992). "Constitutional Law: Filling Senate Vacancies". Villanova Law Review. 37 (1). Villanova University School of Law. ISSN 0042-6229.
- Riker, William H. (1955). "The Senate and American Federalism". American Political Science Review. 49 (2). American Political Science Association: 452–469. doi:10.2307/1951814. ISSN 0003-0554. JSTOR 1951814. S2CID 144680174.
- Rossum, Ralph A. (1999). "The Irony of Constitutional Democracy: Federalism, the Supreme Court, and the Seventeenth Amendment". San Diego Law Review. 36 (3). University of San Diego School of Law. ISSN 0886-3210.
- Tushnet, Mark (2010). The Constitution of the United States of America: A Contextual Analysis. Hart Publishing. ISBN 978-1-84113-738-4.
- Ure, James Christian (2007). "You Scratch My Back and I'll Scratch Yours: Why the Federal Marriage Amendment Should Also Repeal the Seventeenth Amendment". South Texas Law Review. 49 (1). South Texas College of Law. ISSN 1052-343X.
- Vile, John R. (2003). Encyclopedia of constitutional amendments, proposed amendments, and amending issues, 1789–2002 (2nd ed.). ABC-CLIO. ISBN 978-1-85109-428-8.
- Vile, John R. (2010). A companion to the United States Constitution and its amendments (5th ed.). ABC-CLIO. ISBN 978-0-313-38008-2.
- Zywicki, Todd J. (1994). "Senators and Special Interests: A Public Choice Analysis of the Seventeenth Amendment" (PDF). Oregon Law Review. 73 (1). University of Oregon School of Law. ISSN 0196-2043.
- Zywicki, Todd J. (1997). "Beyond the Shell and Husk of History: The History of the Seventeenth Amendment and its Implications for Current Reform Proposals" (PDF). Cleveland State Law Review. 45 (1). Cleveland-Marshall College of Law. ISSN 0009-8876.
- Wendy J. Schiller and Charles Stewart III (May 2013), The 100th Anniversary of the 17th Amendment: A Promise Unfulfilled?, Issues in Governance Studies, Number 59 May 2013
- Schiller, Wendy J.; Stewart, Charles; Xiong, Benjamin (July 2013). "U.S. Senate Elections before the 17th Amendment: Political Party Cohesion and Conflict 1871–1913". The Journal of Politics. 75 (3): 835–847. doi:10.1017/S0022381613000479.
