= Daniel R. Coquillette =

Law professor

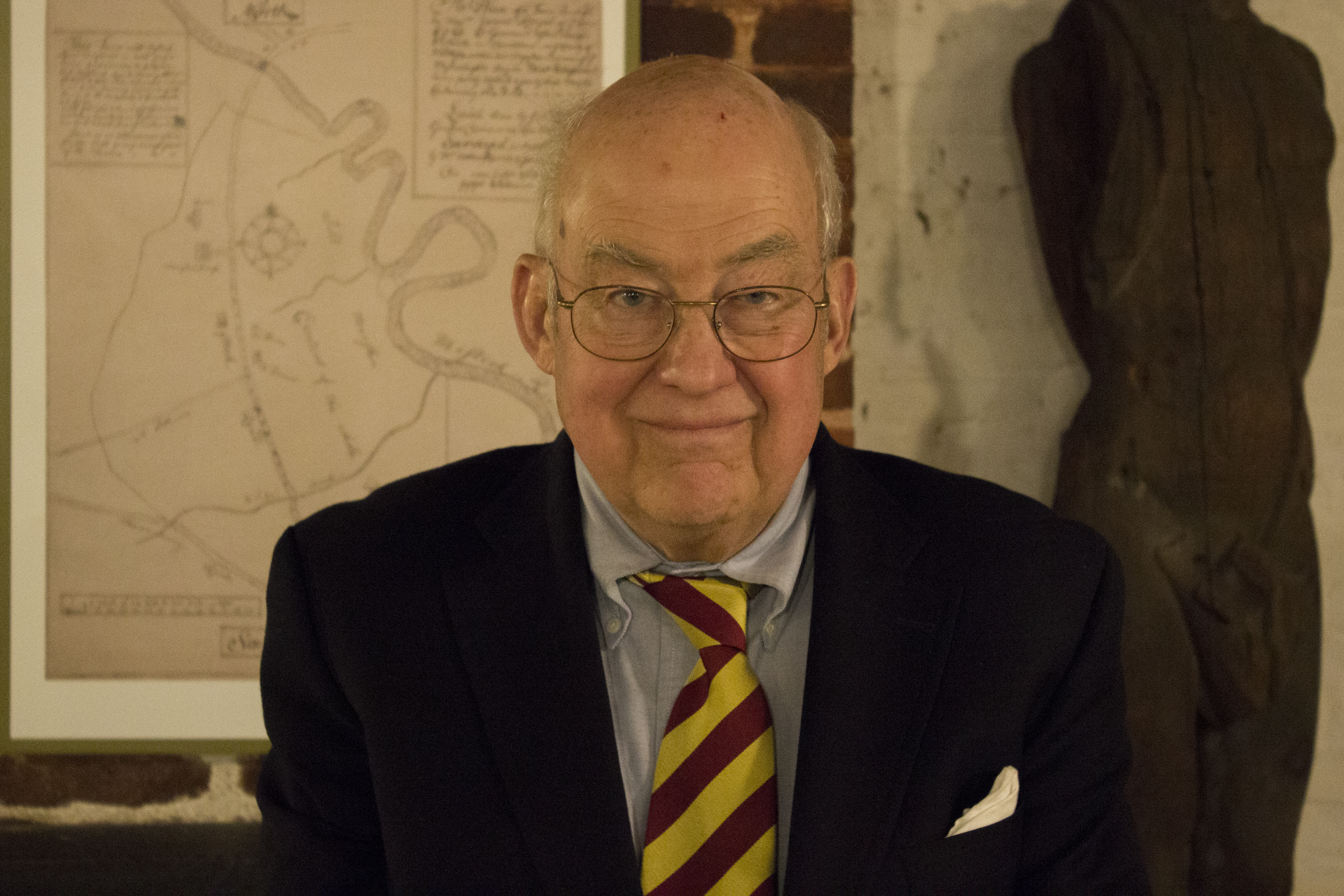
- Coquillette in 2016
- Title: J. Donald Monan University Professor of Law; Dean Emeritus (1985-1992); Charles Warren Visiting Professor of American Legal History

Academic background
- Education: Williams College (BA 1966); University College, Oxford (BA 1969, MA 1980); Harvard Law School (JD 1971)

Daniel R. Coquillette is the J. Donald Monan University Professor of Law and Dean Emeritus at Boston College and the Charles Warren Visiting Professor of American Legal History at Harvard Law School. He is the author of 13 books and 27 articles.

== Education ==
Coquillette Received a B.A. Summa Cum Laude from Williams College (1966) and earned a Fulbright Program Scholarship to study law at University College, Oxford where he earned a B.A. in Juris. (1969) and an M.A. (1980). He received a J.D. Magna Cum Laude from Harvard Law School (1971), where he served as an Editor of the Harvard Law Review.

== Career ==
Upon graduating from Harvard Law School, Coquillette clerked for Associate Justice Robert Braucher of the Massachusetts Supreme Judicial Court from 1971-1973, and for Chief Justice Warren E. Burger on the Supreme Court from 1972-1973. He began his career in education teaching legal ethics as part of the faculty at Boston University School of Law, and later taught as a Visiting Professor at Cornell Law School and Harvard Law School.

He then went on to practice for six years at the Boston law firm Palmer & Dodge, where he specialized in complex litigation and was a Partner.

After working at the firm, he became Dean of Boston College Law School from 1985-1993, and was named J. Donald Monan University Professor in 1996. He was named the Lester Kissel Visiting Professor of Law at Harvard from 2001-2007 and the Charles Warren Visiting Professor of American Legal History 2008-date. Coquillette taught Professional Responsibility, English Legal History, and currently teaches a seminar on the History of American Legal Education.

== Publications ==
Coquillette's many books and publications include:

- Coquillette, Daniel R.; Kimball, Bruce A. (2020). "The Intellectual Sword: Harvard Law School, the Second Century". Harvard University Press. pp. 880 pages, 64 photos, 11 illus. ISBN 9780674737327. Belknap Press Award.
- On the Battlefield of Merit: Harvard Law School, The First Century (with Bruce Kimball). Peter Dobkin Hall Prize.
- Real Ethics for Real Lawyers, (2016).
- Scope and Purpose and One Form of Action, Vol. 1 Moore's. Federal Practice (3rd ed., Lexis Nexis, 2013)
- The Federal Law of Attorney Conduct, Vol. 30 (3rd ed., Lexis Nexis, 2012).
- Portrait of a Patriot: The Major Political and Legal Papers of Josiah Quincy Junior (Co-Editors: Daniel R. Coquillette and Neil Longley York).
- The Anglo-American Legal Heritage
- Lawyers and Fundamental Moral Responsibility (Cincinnati, 1995).
- Francis Bacon (Stanford, Edinburgh University Presses, 1992).
- The Civilian Writers of Doctors' Commons, London (Berlin, 1988), Duncker & Humbolt Publishers (Comparative Studies in Continental and Anglo-American Legal History, Henkel Foundation, Prof. Dr. Knut Wolfgang Norr, gen. ed.).
- Law in Colonial Massachusetts (Boston, 1984), Volume Editor, Colonial Society Research Volume, University of Virginia Press. Author, "Introduction: The 'Countenance of Authoritie'" and "Justinian in Braintree: John Adams, Civilian Learning, and Legal Elitism, 1758-1775."
