= List of law clerks for the tenth seat of the Supreme Court of the United States =

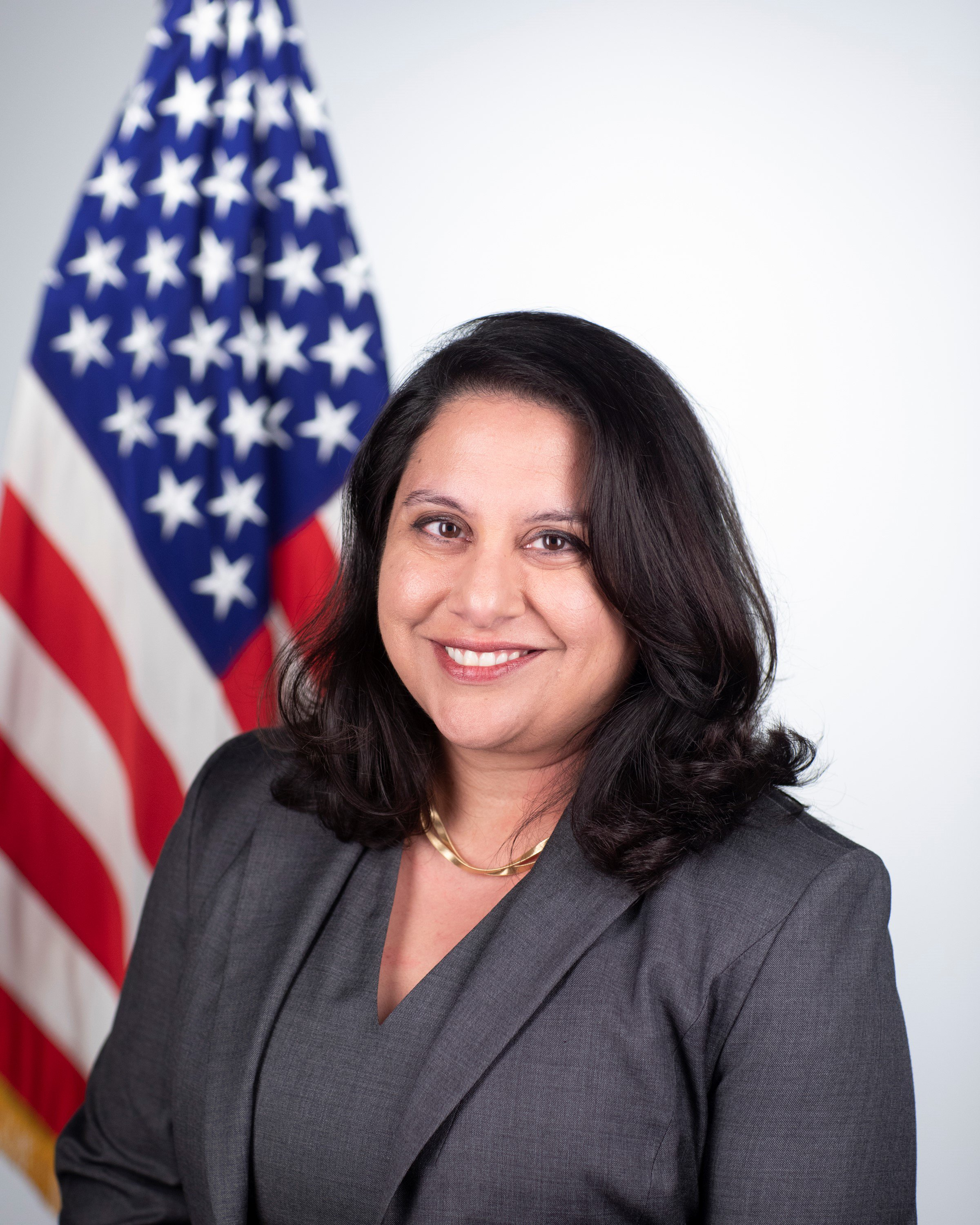
Neomi Rao, Judge of the United States Court of Appeals for the District of Columbia Circuit, clerked for Justice Clarence Thomas during the 2001 term.

Law clerks have assisted the justices of the United States Supreme Court in various capacities since the first one was hired by Justice Horace Gray in 1882. Each justice is permitted to have between three and four law clerks per Court term. Most persons serving in this capacity are recent law school graduates (and typically graduated at the top of their class). Among their many functions, clerks do legal research that assists justices in deciding what cases to accept and what questions to ask during oral arguments, prepare memoranda, and draft orders and opinions. After retiring from the Court, a justice may continue to employ a law clerk, who may be assigned to provide additional assistance to an active justice or may assist the retired justice when sitting by designation with a lower court.

== Table of law clerks ==
The following is a table of law clerks serving the associate justice holding the tenth seat of the Supreme Court (the Court's tenth associate justice seat by order of creation), which was established on April 10, 1869 by the 41st Congress through the Judiciary Act of 1869 (16 Stat. 44). (Note: This new seat was created after two seats had been abolished as a result of the Judicial Circuits Act of 1866 (14 Stat. 209).) This seat is currently occupied by Justice Clarence Thomas.

Seat 10 associate justices and law clerks

Joseph P. Bradley

March 23, 1870 –
January 22, 1892

Clerk	Started	Finished	School (year)	Previous clerkship
Charles Wood				
Eldwin Raphael Hayden				

George Shiras Jr.

October 10, 1892 –
February 23, 1903

Clerk	Started	Finished	School (year)	Previous clerkship
Eldwin Raphael Hayden	1893			

William R. Day

March 2, 1903 –
November 13, 1922

Clerk	Started	Finished	School (year)	Previous clerkship
Luther Day	1903	1903		
Stephen Albion Day	1906	1906	Michigan (did not graduate; admitted to bar, 1907)	M. Fuller
Rufus S. Day	1907	1911		
Rufus S. Day	1917	1919		

Pierce Butler

January 2, 1923 –
November 16, 1939

Clerk	Started	Finished	School (year)	Previous clerkship
John Francis Cotter	1923	1939	Catholic (1921)	
William A.D. Dyke	1923	1924	Georgetown (1921)	Pitney
Norris Darrell	1923	1925	Minnesota (1923)	
Richard L. Sullivan	1927	1928	Minnesota (1926)	
William Devereaux Donnelly	1928	1936	Minnesota (1928)	
Irving Clark	1937	1938	Harvard (1937)	
Luther E. ("L.E.") Jones, Jr.	1938	1939	Texas (1937)	

Frank Murphy

February 5, 1940 –
July 19, 1949

Clerk	Started	Finished	School (year)	Previous clerkship
Edwin E. Huddleson	1940	1940	Harvard (1938)	A. Hand (2d Cir.)
John J. Adams	1940	1941	Michigan (1940)	none
John H. Pickering	1941	1943	Michigan (1940)	none
Eugene Gressman	1943	1948	Michigan (1940)	none
John R. Dykema	1948	1949	Michigan (1947)	
Thomas Lawrence Tolan Jr.	1948	1949	Michigan (1948)	
J.R. Swenson	1948	1949	Michigan (1948)	
William J. Schrenk, Jr.	1949	1950	Michigan (1949)	

Tom C. Clark

August 24, 1949 –
June 12, 1967

Clerk	Started	Finished	School (year)	Previous clerkship
Thomas Lawrence Tolan Jr.	1949	1950	Michigan (1948)	Murphy
Percy D. Williams, Jr.	1949	1951	Harvard (1946)	
Donald F. Turner	1950	1951	Yale (1950)	
Stuart W. Thayer	1951	1952	Yale (1951)	none
C. Richard Walker	1951	1952	Chicago (1950)	
Vester T. Hughes	1952	1952 (drafted, Korean War)	Harvard (1952)	none
Frederick M. Rowe	1952	1953	Yale (1952)	none
Bernard Weisberg	1952	1953	Chicago (1952)	
Ellis H. McKay	1953	1954	Penn (1953)	
Ernest Rubenstein	1953	1954	Yale (1953)	none
William Kenneth Jones	1954	1955	Columbia (1954)	none
John Kaplan	1954	1955	Harvard (1954)	none
Robert W. Hamilton	1955	1956	Chicago (1955)	none
John E. Nolan	1955	1956	Georgetown (1955)	none
John J. Crown	1956	1957	Northwestern (1956)	
Harry L. Hobson	1956	1957	NYU (1956)	
Robert P. Gorman	1957	1958	Notre Dame (1957)	
William D. Powell Jr.	1957	1958	SMU (1957)	none
Charles H. Phillips	1958	1959	USC (1958)	
Max O. Truitt, Jr.	1958	1959	Yale (1958)	
Larry E. Temple	1959	1960	Texas (1959)	none
Thomas Cecil Wray, Jr.	1959	1960	Yale (1959)	none
Carl L. Estes, II	1960	1961	Texas (1960)	
Malachy T. Mahon	1960	1961	Fordham (1960)	
James E. Knox	1961	1962	Drake (LLB 1961) / Houston (JD 1964)	
Burk W. Mathes, Jr.	1961	1962	Harvard (1961)	
Raymond L. Brown	1962	1963	Mississippi (1962)	none
Martin J. Flynn	1962	1963	Indiana (1962)	
James L. McHugh, Jr.	1963	1964	Villanova (1963)	
James H. Pipkin, Jr.	1963	1964	Harvard (1963)	
Michael William Maupin	1964	1965	Virginia (1964)	
Shannon H. Ratliff	1964	1965	Texas (1964)	none
Lee A. Freeman, Jr.	1965	1966	Harvard (1965)	none
Charles D. Reed	1965	1966	Texas A&M (1965)	
Marshall Groce	1966	1967	St. Mary's (1966)	
Stuart Philip Ross	1966	1967	GW (1966)	none
J. Larry Nichols (shared with Warren)	1967	1968	Michigan (1967)	
Jerry W. Snider (shared with Burger)	1969	1970	Houston (1969)	
Theodore L. Garrett (shared with Burger)	1970	1971	Columbia (1968)	J. J. Smith (2d Cir.)
C. Taylor Ashworth (shared with Brennan)	1971	1972	Texas (1971)	
Thomas Wilson Reavley (shared with Burger, Blackmun, Powell)	1972	1973	Harvard (1972)	
Stafford Hutchinson	1973	1974	Texas (1971)	
William M. Hannay	1974	1975	Georgetown (1975)	Bright (8th Cir.)
Thomas D. Corrigan	1975	1976	Case Western (1975)	
J. Thomas Marten	1976	1977	Washburn (1976)	

Thurgood Marshall

October 2, 1967 –
October 1, 1991

Clerk	Started	Finished	School (year)	Previous clerkship
Peter Van N. Lockwood	1967	1968	Harvard (1966)	Aldrich (1st Cir.)
Ronald Greene	1968	1969	Harvard (1968)	
Stephen M. Tennis	1968	1969	Stanford (1967)	Duniway (9th Cir.)
Thomas C. Grey	1969	1970	Yale (1968)	J. S. Wright (D.C. Cir.)
Gary D. Wilson	1969	1970	Stanford (1968)	Feinberg (2d Cir.)
Lewis D. Sargentich	1970	1971	Harvard (1970)	
Paul D. Gewirtz	1971	1972	Yale (1970)	Frankel (S.D.N.Y.)
Stephen A. Saltzburg	1971	1972	Penn (1970)	Weigel (N.D. Cal.)
Barbara D. Underwood	1971	1972	Georgetown (1969)	Bazelon (D.C. Cir.)
Louis Michael Seidman	1972	1973	Harvard (1971)	J. S. Wright (D.C. Cir.)
Mark V. Tushnet	1972	1973	Yale (1971)	McCree (6th Cir.)
Ira M. Feinberg	1973	1974	Harvard (1972)	Friendly (2d Cir.)
Allen M. Katz	1973	1974	Stanford (1972)	J. S. Wright (D.C. Cir.)
Bernard J. Carl	1973	1974	Virginia (1972)	
William Curtis Bryson	1974	1975	Texas (1973)	Friendly (2d Cir.)
Douglas H. Ginsburg	1974	1975	Chicago (1973)	McGowan (D.C. Cir.)
Karen Hastie Williams	1974	1975	Catholic (1973)	S. Robinson (D.C. Cir.)
Kevin T. Baine	1975	1976	Penn (1974)	Weinfeld (S.D.N.Y.)
Gregory L. Diskant	1975	1976	Columbia (1974)	J. S. Wright (D.C. Cir.)
Daniel Segal	1975	1976	Harvard (1973)	Bazelon (D.C. Cir)
David A. Barrett	1975	1976	Columbia (1974)	Feinberg (2d Cir.)
David Silberman	1975	1976	Harvard (1975)	
Susan Low Bloch	1976	1977	Michigan (1975)	S. Robinson (D.C. Cir.)
Ellen M. Semonoff (Meltzer)	1976	1977	Harvard (1975)	
Allan B. Taylor	1976	1977	Harvard (1975)	J. S. Wright (D.C. Cir.)
Vicki C. Jackson	1977	1978	Yale (1975)	M. Lasker (S.D.N.Y.) / Gurfein (2d Cir.)
Miles N. Ruthberg	1977	1978	Harvard (1976)	McGowan (D.C. Cir)
Phillip L. Spector	1977	1978	Harvard (1976)	Oakes (2d Cir.)
Sondra E. Berchin	1978	1979	UCLA (1977)	Oakes (2d Cir.)
Deborah Rhode	1978	1979	Yale (1977)	Gurfein (2d Cir.)
Robert N. Weiner	1978	1979	Yale (1977)	Friendly (2d Cir.)
David G. Norrell	1978	1979	Virginia (1977)	
Janet Cooper Alexander	1979	1980	Berkeley (1978)	Hufstedler (9th Cir.)
Philip P. Frickey	1979	1980	Michigan (1978)	Wisdom (5th Cir.)
Cass R. Sunstein	1979	1980	Harvard (1978)	Kaplan (Mass.)
Richard W. Clary	1979	1980	Harvard (1978)	Mansfield (2d Cir.)
Stephen L. Carter	1980	1981	Yale (1979)	S. Robinson (D.C. Cir.)
Martha L. Minow	1980	1981	Yale (1979)	Bazelon (D.C. Cir.)
Adebayo Ogunlesi	1980	1981	Harvard (1979)	
John A. Siliciano	1980	1981	Columbia (1979)	Feinberg (2d Cir.)
Stephen I. Glover	1981	1982	Harvard (1980)	J. S. Wright (D.C. Cir.)
Kenneth W. Simons	1981	1982	Michigan (1978)	Oakes (2d Cir.)
Virginia Whitner (Hoptman)	1981	1982	Virginia (1980)	Seitz (3d Cir.)
David B. Wilkins	1981	1982	Harvard (1980)	Feinberg (2d Cir.)
Bruce A. Green	1982	1983	Columbia (1981)	Oakes (2d Cir.)
Edwin G. Schallert	1982	1983	Harvard (1981)	J.S. Wright (D.C. Cir.)
Paul Mogin	1982	1983	Harvard (1980)	Friendly (2d Cir.)
Lawrence P. Tu	1982	1983	Harvard (1981)	Mansfield (2d Cir.)
William W. Fisher, III	1983	1984	Harvard (1982)	H. Edwards (D.C. Cir.)
Gay Gellhorn	1983	1984	Seattle (1982)	Oakes (2d Cir.)
Howell E. Jackson	1983	1984	Harvard (1982)	Newman (2d Cir.)
Randall L. Kennedy	1983	1984	Yale (1982)	J. S. Wright (D.C. Cir.)
Walter A. Kamiat	1984	1985	Stanford (1983)	J. S. Wright (D.C. Cir.)
Richard H. Pildes	1984	1985	Harvard (1983)	Mikva (D.C. Cir.)
Richard L. Revesz	1984	1985	Yale (1983)	Feinberg (2d Cir.)
Nicole Seligman	1984	1985	Harvard (1983)	H. Edwards (D.C. Cir.)
Rebecca Latham Brown	1985	1986	Georgetown (1984)	S. Robinson (D.C. Cir.)
Paul G. Mahoney	1985	1986	Yale (1984)	Winter (2d Cir.)
Daniel C. Richman	1985	1986	Yale (1984)	Feinberg (2d Cir.)
Jonathan T. Weinberg	1985	1986	Columbia (1983)	R. B. Ginsburg (D.C. Cir.)
Glen M. Darbyshire	1986	1987	Georgia (1984)	F. Johnson (11th Cir.)
Eben Moglen	1986	1987	Yale (1985)	Weinfeld (S.D.N.Y.)
Margaret Raymond	1986	1987	Columbia (1985)	Oakes (2d Cir.)
Rosemary Herbert	1986	1987	Yale (1985)	Feinberg (2d Cir.)
Elena Kagan	1987	1988	Harvard (1986)	Mikva (D.C. Cir.)
Harry P. Litman	1987	1988	Berkeley (1986)	Mikva (D.C. Cir.)
Carol S. Steiker	1987	1988	Harvard (1986)	J. S. Wright (D.C. Cir.)
Michael P. Doss	1987	1988	Penn (1986)	J. Oakes (2d Cir.)
Paul A. Engelmayer	1988	1989	Harvard (1987)	Wald (D.C. Cir.)
Margaret E. Tahyar	1988	1989	Columbia (1987)	Bork (D.C. Cir.)
Jonathan D. Schwartz	1988	1989	Stanford (1986)	H. Edwards (D.C. Cir.)
Debra L. W. Cohn	1988	1989	NYU (1987)	Oakes (2d Cir.)
H. Elizabeth Garrett	1989	1990	Virginia (1988)	Williams (D.C. Cir.)
Gregory M. Priest	1989	1990	Stanford (1988)	D. Ginsburg (D.C. Cir.)
Jordan M. Steiker	1989	1990	Harvard (1988)	L. Pollak (E.D. Pa.)
Michael A. Vatis	1989	1990	Harvard (1988)	R. B. Ginsburg (D.C. Cir.)
Scott Brewer	1990	1991	Yale (1989)	H. Edwards (D.C. Cir.)
Sheryll D. Cashin	1990	1991	Harvard (1989)	Mikva (D.C. Cir.)
Michael D. Davis	1990	1991	Harvard (1989)	Oakes (2d Cir.)
Dan M. Kahan	1990	1991	Harvard (1989)	H. Edwards (D.C. Cir.)
James E. Castello (shared with Brennan)	1990	1991	Berkeley (1986)	Mikva (D.C. Cir.)
Crystal Nix(-Hines) (shared with O'Connor)	1991	1992	Harvard (1990)	W. Norris (9th Cir.)
Radhika Rao (shared with Blackmun)	1992	1993	Harvard (1990)	Cudahy (7th Cir.)

Clarence Thomas

October 23, 1991 –
Incumbent

Clerk	Started	Finished	School (year)	Previous clerkship
Gregory G. Katsas	1991	1992	Harvard (1989)	Thomas (D.C. Cir.) / Becker (3d Cir.)
Christopher Landau	1991	1992	Harvard (1989)	Scalia / Thomas (D.C. Cir.)
Gregory E. Maggs	1991	1992	Harvard (1988)	Kennedy / Sneed (9th Cir.)
Arnon D. Siegel	1991	1992	Yale (1988)	Thomas (D.C. Cir.) / R. Patterson, Jr. (S.D.N.Y.)
Stephen R. McAllister (shared with White)	1991	1992	Kansas (1988)	B. White (twice) / Posner (7th Cir.)
Steven G. Bradbury	1992	1993	Michigan (1988)	Buckley (D.C. Cir.)
Jim Chen	1992	1993	Harvard (1991)	Luttig (4th Cir.)
Dan Himmelfarb	1992	1993	Yale (1991)	Luttig (4th Cir.)
Laura Ingraham	1992	1993	Virginia (1991)	Winter (2d Cir.)
Karl M. Tilleman (shared with Burger)	1992	1993	BYU (1990)	Noonan (9th Cir.)
Allison Hartwell Eid	1993	1994	Chicago (1991)	J.E. Smith (5th Cir.)
Eric C. Nelson	1993	1994	Yale (1992)	Luttig (4th Cir.)
Patrick F. Philbin	1993	1994	Harvard (1992)	Silberman (D.C. Cir.)
Stephen F. Smith	1993	1994	Virginia (1992)	Sentelle (D.C. Cir.)
James E. Gauch (shared with Burger)	1993	1994	Chicago (1989)	Nelson (6th Cir.)
Thomas Rex Lee	1994	1995	Chicago (1991)	Wilkinson (4th Cir.)
Caleb Nelson	1994	1995	Yale (1993)	Williams (D.C. Cir.)
Saikrishna B. Prakash	1994	1995	Yale (1993)	Silberman (D.C. Cir.)
John C. Yoo	1994	1995	Yale (1992)	Silberman (D.C. Cir.)
Eric A. Grant (shared with Burger)	1994	1995	Berkeley (1990)	E. Jones (5th Cir.)
Gregory S. Coleman	1995	1996	Texas (1992)	E. Jones (5th Cir.)
Laurie Allen Gallancy (Mullig)	1995	1996	Chicago (1990)	D. Ginsburg (D.C. Cir.)
Craig S. Primis	1995	1996	Harvard (1994)	Luttig (4th Cir.)
Helgi C. Walker	1995	1996	Virginia (1994)	Wilkinson (4th Cir.)
Brendan P. Cullen	1996	1997	Stanford (1995)	Silberman (D.C. Cir.)
John Eastman	1996	1997	Chicago (1995)	Luttig (4th Cir.)
Erik S. Jaffe	1996	1997	Columbia (1990)	D. Ginsburg (D.C. Cir.)
Michael E. O'Neill	1996	1997	Yale (1990)	Sentelle (D.C. Cir.)
Arthur S. Long	1997	1998	Harvard (1993)	Luttig (4th Cir.)
Carl J. Nichols	1997	1998	Chicago (1995)	Silberman (D.C. Cir.)
Wendy E. Stone (Long)	1997	1998	Northwestern (1995)	Winter (2d Cir.)
John F. Wood	1997	1998	Harvard (1995)	Luttig (4th Cir.)
Nicole Stelle Garnett	1998	1999	Yale (1995)	M. Arnold (8th Cir.)
Eric J. Kadel Jr.	1998	1999	Virginia (1997)	Silberman (D.C. Cir.)
Patrick L. O'Daniel	1998	1999	Texas (1992)	Garwood (5th Cir.)
Peter B. Rutledge	1998	1999	Chicago (1997)	Wilkinson (4th Cir.)
Steven T. Cottreau	1999	2000	NYU (1998)	Wilkinson (4th Cir.)
C. Kevin Marshall	1999	2000	Chicago (1998)	Luttig (4th Cir.)
Kristen L. Silverberg	1999	2000	Texas (1996)	Sentelle (D.C. Cir.)
Sanford I. Weisburst	1999	2000	Chicago (1998)	Silberman (D.C. Cir.)
Jonathan F. Cohn	2000	2001	Harvard (1997)	O'Scannlain (9th Cir.)
Kathryn Louise "Kate" Comerford (Todd)	2000	2001	Harvard (1999)	Luttig (4th Cir.)
Eric D. Miller	2000	2001	Chicago (1999)	Silberman (D.C. Cir.)
Ann M. Scarlett	2000	2001	Kansas (1999)	Bowman (8th Cir.)
Matthew B. Berry	2001	2002	Yale (1997)	Silberman (D.C. Cir.)
Sigal Mandelker	2001	2002	Penn (2000)	E. Jones (5th Cir.)
Neomi Rao	2001	2002	Chicago (1999)	Wilkinson (4th Cir.)
Margaret A. Ryan	2001	2002	Notre Dame (1995)	Luttig (4th Cir.)
Victoria Dorfman	2002	2003	Harvard (2001)	Luttig (4th Cir.)
Adam K. Mortara	2002	2003	Chicago (2001)	Higginbotham (5th Cir.)
David Stras	2002	2003	Kansas (1999)	Luttig (4th Cir.) / Brunetti (9th Cir.)
Emin Toro	2002	2003	North Carolina (2001)	Henderson (D.C. Cir.)
Richard M. Corn	2003	2004	Chicago (2002)	Luttig (4th Cir.)
John A. Eisenberg	2003	2004	Yale (2002)	Luttig (4th Cir.)
Diane L. McGimsey	2003	2004	Berkeley (2002)	Wilkinson (4th Cir.)
Hannah Clayson Smith	2003	2004	BYU (2001)	Alito (3d Cir.)
Jennifer K. Hardy	2004	2005	Yale (2000)	E. Garza (5th Cir.)
Martha M. Pacold	2004	2005	Chicago (2002)	Bybee (9th Cir.) / Randolph (D.C. Cir.)
Jeff Wall	2004	2005	Chicago (2003)	Wilkinson (4th Cir.)
Henry C. Whitaker	2004	2005	Harvard (2003)	Sentelle (D.C. Cir.)
Chantel L. Febus	2005	2006	GW (2002)	E. Jones (5th Cir.) / Lamberth (D.D.C.)
James C. Ho	2005	2006	Chicago (1999)	J.E. Smith (5th Cir.)
John M. Hughes	2005	2006	Chicago (2004)	Luttig (4th Cir.)
Ashley E. Johnson	2005	2006	Vanderbilt (2004)	Luttig (4th Cir.)
John D. Adams	2006	2007	Virginia (2003)	Sentelle (D.C. Cir.)
David A. Bragdon	2006	2007	Virginia (2002)	Williams (D.C. Cir.)
Adam M. Conrad	2006	2007	Georgia (2005)	Sentelle (D.C. Cir.)
Brandt Arthur Leibe	2006	2007	Yale (2005)	Luttig (4th Cir.)
Eric D. McArthur	2007	2008	Chicago (2005)	Luttig (4th Cir.)
Carrie Severino	2007	2008	Harvard (2004)	Sentelle (D.C. Cir.)
Heath P. Tarbert	2007	2008	Penn (2001)	D. Ginsburg (D.C. Cir.)
Leila Kimberly Thompson (Mongan)	2007	2008	NYU (2005)	Sentelle (D.C. Cir.) / Lamberth (D.D.C.)
William S. Consovoy	2008	2009	George Mason (2001)	E. Jones (5th Cir.)
Claire J. Evans	2008	2009	Rutgers – Camden (2002)	Sentelle (D.C. Cir.) / Chertoff (3d Cir.) / Simandle (D.N.J.)
Jennifer Mascott	2008	2009	GW (2006)	Kavanaugh (D.C. Cir.)
Patrick N. Strawbridge	2008	2009	Creighton (2004)	H. Dana (Maine) / M. Arnold (8th Cir.)
Tyler R. Green	2009	2010	Utah (2005)	McConnell (10th Cir.) / Cassell (D. Utah)
Brian P. Morrissey Jr.	2009	2010	Notre Dame (2007)	O'Scannlain (9th Cir.)
Elizabeth P. Papez	2009	2010	Harvard (1999)	Boggs (6th Cir.)
Marah C. Stith	2009	2010	Yale (2006)	O'Scannlain (9th Cir.)
Matthew A. Fitzgerald	2010	2011	Virginia (2008)	Carnes (11th Cir.)
Allison B. Jones (Rushing)	2010	2011	Duke (2007)	Sentelle (D.C. Cir.) / Gorsuch (10th Cir.)
Elbert Lin	2010	2011	Yale (2003)	Keeton (D. Mass) / W. Pryor (11th Cir.)
William R. Peterson	2010	2011	Texas (2008)	E. Jones (5th Cir.)
Liam P. Hardy	2011	2012	Georgetown (2008)	Ryan (C.A.A.F.) / Sentelle (D.C. Cir.)
Brian C. Lea	2011	2012	Georgia (2009)	Carnes (11th Cir.)
Matthew B. Nicholson	2011	2012	Virginia (2009)	Wilkinson (4th Cir.)
Michelle S. Stratton	2011	2012	LSU (2009)	E. Jones (5th Cir.)
Robert L. Dunn	2012	2013	Chicago (2010)	O'Scannlain (9th Cir.)
David M. Morrell	2012	2013	Yale (2010)	E. Jones (5th Cir.)
Kenton J. Skarin	2012	2013	Northwestern (2009)	Wilkinson (4th Cir.)
Janet Y. Galeria	2012	2013	Berkeley (2011)	Griffith (D.C. Cir.)
Rebekah S. Perry (Ricketts)	2013	2014	Yale (2010)	Cabranes (2d Cir.) / R. Sullivan (S.D.N.Y.)
Andrew Pinson	2013	2014	Georgia (2011)	Sentelle (D.C. Cir.)
Brian D. Schmalzbach	2013	2014	Virginia (2010)	Wilkinson (4th Cir.)
Katherine C. Yarger	2013	2014	Duke (2008)	Gorsuch (10th Cir.) / Eid (Colo.)
Jennifer M. Bandy (Dickey)	2014	2015	Duke (2012)	W. Pryor (11th Cir.)
G. Brinton Lucas	2014	2015	Virginia (2011)	Wilkinson (4th Cir.)
Haley Nix (Proctor)	2014	2015	Yale (2012)	Griffith (D.C. Cir.)
Robert N. Stander	2014	2015	BYU (2011)	Sutton (6th Cir.) / Lee (Utah)
Sarah M. Harris	2015	2016	Harvard (2009)	Lynch (1st Cir.) / Silberman (D.C. Cir.)
Robert J. Leider	2015	2016	Yale (2012)	Sykes (7th Cir.)
Marisa C. Maleck (Johnson)	2015	2016	Chicago (2011)	W. Pryor (11th Cir.)
Scott G. Stewart	2015	2016	Stanford (2008)	O'Scannlain (9th Cir.)
Taylor Ann Rausch Meehan	February 2016	2016	Chicago (2013)	Scalia / W. Pryor (11th Cir.)
Jonathan D. Urick	February 2016	2016	Virginia (2013)	Scalia / Sutton (6th Cir.) / Thapar (E.D. Ky.)
Andrew N. Ferguson	2016	2017	Virginia (2012)	Henderson (D.C. Cir.)
Kasdin Mitchell	2016	2017	Yale (2012)	W. Pryor (11th Cir.)
Austin L. Raynor	2016	2017	Virginia (2013)	Wilkinson (4th Cir.)
Jacob T. Spencer	2016	2017	Harvard (2012)	J.E. Smith (5th Cir.) / O'Scannlain (9th Cir.)
Gregory F. Miller (hired by Scalia)	2017	2018	Berkeley (2012)	Thapar (E.D. Ky.) / Carnes (11th Cir.)
Gilbert C. Dickey	2017	2018	Chicago (2012)	W. Pryor (11th Cir.)
Brittney Marie Lane	2017	2018	Pepperdine (2012)	O'Scannlain (9th Cir.) / Sutton (6th Cir.)
Cameron Thomas Norris	2017	2018	Vanderbilt (2014)	W. Pryor (11th Cir.) / Henderson (D.C. Cir.)
Kathryn Anne Kimball (Mizelle)	2018	2019	Florida (2012)	Katsas (D.C. Cir.) / W. Pryor (11th Cir.) / Moody (M.D. Fla.)
Christopher Ernest Mills	2018	2019	Harvard (2012)	Sentelle (D.C. Cir.)
Russell Balikian	2018	2019	Yale (2012)	Sykes (7th Cir.) / Katsas (D.C. Cir.)
Madeline Ward Lansky (Clark)	2018	2019	Chicago (2016)	W. Pryor (11th Cir.)
Brian Lipshutz	2019	2020	Yale (2015)	W. Pryor (11th Cir.) / Katsas (D.C. Cir.)
Caroline Cook Lindsay	2019	2020	Chicago (2016)	Sykes (7th Cir.) / Katsas (D.C. Cir.)
James Matthew Rice	2019	2020	Berkeley (2016)	Ikuta (9th Cir.)
Laura E. Wolk	2019	2020	Notre Dame (2016)	J.R. Brown (D.C. Cir.) / Hardiman (3d Cir.)
Philip M. Cooper	2020	2021	Chicago (2017)	W. Pryor (11th Cir.) / Stras (8th Cir.)
Joshua M. Divine	2020	2021	Yale (2016)	W. Pryor (11th Cir.)
Jack L. Millman	2020	2021	NYU (2016)	O'Scannlain (9th Cir.) / Carnes (11th Cir.)
Amy R. Upshaw	2020	2021	Chicago (2016)	Sykes (7th Cir.)
Christopher C. Goodnow	2021	2022	Harvard (2017)	Katsas (D.C. Cir.) / Sykes (7th Cir.)
Steven J. Lindsay	2021	2022	Yale (2017)	Griffith (D.C. Cir.)
Scott Proctor	2021	2022	Harvard (2017)	Sutton (6th Cir.)
J. Manuel Valle	2021	2022	Chicago (2017)	E. Jones (5th Cir.) / Larsen (6th Cir.)
Bijan M. Aboutorabi	2022	2023	Chicago (2018)	W. Pryor (11th Cir.) / Thapar (6th Cir.) / Mitchell (Ala.)
Michael Corcoran	2022	2023	Virginia (2017)	Bibas (3d Cir.) / J.E. Smith (5th Cir.)
Daniel J. Shapiro	2022	2023	George Mason (2018)	Rao (D.C. Cir.) / Jolly (5th Cir.)
Christine M. Buzzard	2022	2023	Yale (2013)	Sullivan (S.D.N.Y.) / J.R. Brown (D.C. Cir.)
C. William Courtney	2023	2024	Harvard (2019)	W. Pryor (11th Cir.) / Mitchell (Ala.)
Caroline Stephens Milner	2023	2024	Alabama (2018)	W. Pryor (11th Cir.) / Rao (D.C. Cir.)
Jasmine Stein	2023	2024	Yale (2019)	Thapar (6th Cir.)
Reid Coleman	2023	2024	Texas (2021)	E. Jones (5th Cir.) / Katsas (D.C. Cir.)
Alexis Zhang	2024	2025	Yale (2020)	Katsas (D.C. Cir.) / W. Pryor (11th Cir.)
Thomas Wilson	2024	2025	Yale (2017)	Newsom (11th Cir.)
Crystal Clanton	2024	2025	George Mason (2022)	W. Pryor (11th Cir.) / Maze (N.D. Ala.)
Ryan Proctor	2024	2025	Harvard (2019)	Larsen (6th Cir.) / Katsas (D.C. Cir.)
Jeffrey Hetzel	2025	2026	Stanford (2021)	Newsom (11th Cir.)
William Strench	2025	2026	Chicago (2021)	Rao (D.C. Cir.) / W. Pryor (11th Cir.)
Andrew W. Smith	2025	2026	Harvard (2020)	Katsas (D.C. Cir.) / Sutton (6th Cir.)
C'zar Bernstein	2025	2026	GW (2020)	W. Pryor (11th Cir.) / Maggs (C.A.A.F.)
Jackie Thorbjornson	2026		NYU (2023)	Rao (D.C. Cir.) / Menashi (2d Cir.)
Chris Baldacci	2026		Virginia (2022)	Rao (D.C. Cir.) / J. Smith (5th Cir.)
Tiffany Bates	2026		George Mason (2018)	Duncan (5th Cir.)
Jack Tucker	2026		Virginia (2022)	W. Pryor (11th Cir.) / Brasher (11th Cir.)
Daniel Vitagliano	2027		St. John's (2020)	Duncan (5th Cir.) / Vyskocil (S.D.N.Y.)
Lavi Ben Dor	2027		Penn (2020)	Jordan (3d Cir.) / Randolph (D.C. Cir.)
Stephen Vukovits	2027		Chicago (2024)	W. Pryor (11th Cir.) / Nichols (D.D.C.)
Alexandra Webb	2027		Chicago (2024)	Wilkinson (4th Cir.) / Rao (D.C. Cir.)

== Additional sources ==
- Baier, Paul R. (1973). "The Law Clerks: Profile of an Institution," Vanderbilt L. Rev. 26: 1125–77.
- "Finding Aid to Thurgood Marshall Papers," Library of Congress, list of clerks.
- "Georgia Law Alumni Who Have Clerked for a U.S. Supreme Court Justice," Advocate, Spring/Summer 2004 (listing 6 names).
- Judicial Clerkship Handbook, USC Gould Law School, 2013-2014, p. 33, Appendix B.
- "List of law clerks," The Papers of Justice Tom C. Clark, Tarlton Law Library, University of Texas Law School. Retrieved August 11, 2016.
- Newland, Charles A. (June 1961). "Personal Assistants to the Supreme Court Justices: The Law Clerks," Oregon L. Rev. 40: 306–07.
- News of Supreme Court clerks. University of Virginia Law School, list of clerks, 2004-2018.
- University of Michigan clerks to the Supreme Court, 1991-2017, University of Michigan Law School Web site (2016). Retrieved September 20, 2016.
- Ward, Artemus and David L. Weiden (2006). Sorcerers' Apprentices: 100 Years of Law Clerks at the United States Supreme Court. New York, NY: New York University Press. ISBN 978-0-8147-9420-3, ISBN 978-0-8147-9420-3.
