= Roy L. Brooks =

American legal scholar

- Born: Roy Lavon Brooks; 1950 (age 75–76)
- Citizenship: American
- Occupations: Legal scholar, professor
- Awards: Gustavus Myers Outstanding Book Award (twice); Thurgood Marshall Award; Virgil Hawkins Award; Loren Miller Award

Academic background
- Education: University of Connecticut (B.A.); Yale Law School (J.D., 1975)

Academic work
- Discipline: Law
- Sub-discipline: Civil rights, Civil procedure, Legal theory, Critical theory, Post-conflict justice, Reparations for slavery, Corporate Finance
- Institutions: University of San Diego School of Law (1979–present)
- Main interests: Racial justice, Social justice, Legal theory, Critical theory, Post-conflict justice, Reparations
- Notable works: "Framing Redress Discourse" in NOMOS LXV: Reconciliation and Repair, edited by Melissa Schwartzberg and Eric Beerbohm. (2023); Diversity Judgments: Democratizing Judicial Legitimacy (2022); The Racial Glass Ceiling: Subordination in American Law and Culture (2017); The Law of Discrimination: Cases and Perspectives (with Gilbert Paul Carrasco and Michael Selmi, 2011); Racial Justice in the Age of Obama (2009); Atonement and Forgiveness: A New Model for Black Reparations (2004); Critical Procedure (1998); Integration or Separation?: A Strategy for Racial Equality (1996); Civil Procedure: Cases and Materials for An Advanced Course (1996); Civil Procedure: Cases and Materials for Policy Analysis (1995) "The Anatomy of an Apology." Social Research: An International Quarterly. 87 (2020): 813

Roy Lavon Brooks (born 1950) is an American legal scholar who served as Warren Distinguished Professor of Law and was named a University Professor twice at the University of San Diego School of Law. Brooks is a specialist in civil rights law, legal theory, critical theory, post-conflict justice, and reparations for slavery. He has authored or edited more than 20 books. Brooks is known for framing diverse post-civil rights approaches to social justice, for developing the "atonement model" for reparations, for framing critical theory as a general theory of law and incorporating it into the Supreme Court's deliberative process, and for his role as a founding member of the Critical Race Theory movement.

In 2025, Brooks announced his retirement from the University of San Diego School of Law after 47 years on the faculty. He was the first Black professor at the university, having been recruited in 1979 by Provost Sister Sally Furey, who traveled to New York to persuade him to leave his position at Cravath, Swaine & Moore. Brooks received tenure after his second year of teaching and was twice named University Professor, the university's highest academic honor. He received the Thorsness Prize for Excellence in Scholarship four times and the Thorsness Prize for Excellence in Teaching four times. The university established the Roy L. Brooks Distinguished Lecture Series in 2023.

== Early life and education ==
Brooks was born in 1950 in New Haven, Connecticut, a few miles from Yale University. He earned his Bachelor of Arts degree from the University of Connecticut and his Juris Doctor from Yale Law School in 1975, where he served as senior editor of the Yale Law Journal. During his time at Yale, Brooks helped to initiate civil rights discussions at what students called the "Black Table" in the law school cafeteria, where he engaged social justice debates with classmates, including Bill Clinton, Hillary Rodham, Clarence Thomas, Samuel Alito, Lani Guinier, and Russ Frisby, among others.

== Academic career ==
Brooks joined the University of San Diego School of Law faculty in 1979, becoming the institution's first tenured Black professor. He received tenure after only his second year of teaching.

In 1995, Brooks was one of two professors named the first Warren Distinguished Professor of Law, the highest honor the law school confers for excellence in scholarship. In 2005 and again in 2018, Brooks was named University Professor, the highest honor bestowed university-wide by USD for "outstanding scholarly achievement." The university established the Roy L. Brooks Distinguished Lecture Series in his honor in 2023.

Brooks is a member of the Authors Guild and holds a Lifetime Membership in the American Law Institute.

== Work and research ==
=== Social justice framings ===
Brooks often uses the "Black Table" at Yale Law School, where law students gathered in the 1970s to discuss diverse perspectives on social justice issues, especially racial justice, as a metaphor for the intellectual rigor and respectful disagreement that Brooks advocates in many of his works. Harvard Law Professor Charles Ogletree called Brooks’ social justice scholarship "powerful, thorough, and compelling." University of Virginia Professor Alex M. Johnson wrote that "it will revise how the debate on race is addressed."

Brooks’ social justice works distill four major theories or norms that perform important rhetorical and regulatory functions in civil rights discourse in post-Jim Crow America. Focusing on race, traditionalism supports racial progress but believes that race no longer matters in the pursuit of such progress today. Blacks have agency. Race-conscious governmental policies are divisive, discriminatory, and stigmatizing. In later works, Brooks uses the term "conservative" (meaning non-MAGA conservative) instead of traditionalism. Reformism supports racial progress but believes that race still matters in our post-civil rights society. Integration (diversity and inclusion) is the only way to effectively respond to racialized conditions, and race-conscious government policies are needed to effectuate or encourage racial integration. Brooks later refers to reformism as liberalism. Critical race theory (later called progressivism) posits that White hegemony—systems and institutions that slant in favor of White males and, thereby, reproduce racial disadvantage—matters most in the struggle for racial and other forms of social justice. This dominance of straight White men is not the natural order of things. It is socially constructed, and today it is as much cognitive as it is motivational, if not more so. Restructuring the social order is the only way to eliminate White hegemony. Finally, Limited Separation (now called post-progressives) challenges prior social justice narratives. It emphasizes the importance of self-reliance over the pursuit of integration into or wholesale restructuring of mainstream society. Marginalized groups should focus on building and strengthening their own spaces—institutions and communities—rather than depending on external systems. "The best place to find a helping hand is at the end of your own arm." Three decades before post-progressives became a force in social justice discourse, Brooks offered a theoretical defense of Black Spaces based on de Tocqueville’s Democracy in America and Jefferson’s Notes on the State of Virginia.

=== Reparations theory ===
Brooks is considered the leading scholar on Black reparations in the United States and has been described as having produced "foundational work in the field." His 2004 book Atonement and Forgiveness: A New Model for Black Reparations introduced the "atonement model," which combines formal apology, reparations, and forgiveness as interdependent elements of racial reconciliation. The model posits that "If racial reconciliation is the goal of redressing slavery, then redress must be atonement (apology and reparation) plus forgiveness. With a genuine apology and substantial reparations, the matter of forgiveness arrives on the victims’ desk as a civic subpoena that must be answered." Yale Law School Professor Emeritus Boris I. Bittker praised the work, stating it "will certainly become the standard examination of the issue." Since Brooks emerged, it has become standard practice in the United States to seek an apology from the perpetrator rather than merely requesting reparations.

Brooks' atonement model has generated significant scholarly discussion. The National Black Law Journal (NBL) described it as providing "new promise for advocates" of reparations while addressing "the main argument against reparations: lack of privity." NBL considered that Brooks' shift "from remedy to symbol does much to cure" opposition to reparations, though some critics have questioned whether the model requires "monumental events" and political catalysts, such as Hurricane Katrina, to gain traction. Contemporary reparative private and legislative efforts, such as California’s redress legislation enacted in 2023, routinely begin by issuing an apology.

Testifying before the California Task Force on Reparations in 2022, Brooks presented a legal theory that would enable governments to redress slavery without violating the Supreme Court's then-pending requirement for colorblind government policies, including reparations. Brooks linked reparations to lineage rather than race: reparations would go to the descendants of the enslaved rather than to a particular race. The Task Force's staff, which consisted of the California Department of Justice, adopted his race-neutral approach, which was eventually incorporated into the state's redress legislation enacted in 2024.

=== Influence on climate justice scholarship ===
His atonement model has influenced contemporary debates beyond traditional reparations discourse. Legal scholar Carlton Waterhouse, in his 2025 article "Climate Redress Revisited," extensively applies Brooks' theoretical framework to climate justice issues. Waterhouse notes that Brooks "maintains that reparations require remorse and the intent to atone," with atonement including "remorse for the wrongs committed, coupled with a desire to communicate that remorse to the moral community and to engage in behavior that resets the moral relationship." Waterhouse also emphasizes that under Brooks' model, "apology and subsequent remedial action demonstrate the legitimacy of the apology," requiring substantive compensation beyond mere acknowledgment.

=== Critical Race Theory ===
Brooks helped plan and participated in the 1985 conference that contributed to the launch of Critical Race Theory. Working alongside Derrick Bell, Richard Delgado, Charles Lawrence, Rachel Moran, and Nerissa Skillman, Brooks helped shape the movement's foundational concepts. In 1987 and 1988, Brooks further advanced his analysis by identifying the subordinating mechanism within civil rights law as "formal equal opportunity," which he defined as the interplay between two potentially conflicting norms—"racial integration and racial omission." In addition, rather than focusing on how traditional civil rights law subordinates African Americans writ large, as most critical race theorists still proceed, Brooks’ analysis was more sensitive to class stratification within the post-civil rights African American community. Thus, Brooks extended the analysis of the subordination question—"the notion that civil rights doctrine, practices, and policy give low or no priority to matters of keen interest to African Americans or otherwise call upon Black Americans to endure a disproportionate share of societal hardships"— beyond the prevailing discourse by connecting it to class. Brooks showed how formal equal opportunity subordinated the Black middle class, working class, and poverty class differently.

=== Critical Theory ===
Brooks defines "Critical Theory" as the amalgamation of Critical Race Theory, Critical Feminist Theory, LatCrit Theory, and other oppositional, or outsider, theories that challenge traditional legal thinking. Brooks’ analysis focuses on "hard cases," which are cases that raise socially significant, polycentric issues such as abortion, the Second Amendment, and affirmative action. Brooks was the first to demonstrate how Critical Theory can operate as a general theory of law. He argued that Critical Theory counts as legal theory because it has a cognitive dimension, which reveals things one would not otherwise notice; a constructive dimension, which offers reforms; and a critical dimension, which explains why its view of the world is superior to others'. Legal scholars continue to refer to Brooks's work as "groundbreaking" more than three decades after it first appeared.

=== Legal Theory ===
Brooks has argued that a more inclusive deliberative process is essential to improving the Supreme Court's legitimacy in our diverse society. He advocates adding "critical process" to "traditional process," the Supreme Court's conventional decision-making process. Brooks creates critical process by transforming critical theory from a critique of law into a framework for judicial decision-making. He breaks down both processes into their diverse approaches—positivism, pragmatism, and nominalism for traditional process, and symmetrical, asymmetrical, and hybrid for critical process—and then applies them to dozens of Supreme Court cases. Dean Kevin R. Johnson calls Brooks' work "magisterial," and Professor Joe Feagin writes that it is "dazzling and original work."

== The Roy L. Brooks Distinguished Lecture Series ==
The Roy L. Brooks Distinguished Lecture Series is named after him. It was established at the University of San Diego in 2023 to honor Black thought leaders and scholars committed to inclusive excellence.

== Legal practice and advocacy ==
Beyond academia, Brooks has engaged in significant legal advocacy. In 1999, he articulated concerns about the political viability of reparations. He acknowledged that "in the end, the most important question [concerning African American claims for redress] is whether the average African American citizen cares enough about redress to make it a political issue." Brooks later participated in high-profile advocacy efforts, including when:

- He worked on a reparations complaint for victims of the 1921 Tulsa Race Massacre alongside Charles Ogletree and Johnnie Cochran
- He argued before an international tribunal in South Korea on behalf of Comfort women seeking reparations from Japan

== Selected publications ==
=== Selected books ===
- Diversity Judgments: Democratizing Judicial Legitimacy (Cambridge University Press, 2022)
- The Law of Discrimination: Cases and Perspectives (casebook, multiple editions, 2011)
- The Racial Glass Ceiling: Subordination in American Law and Culture (Yale University Press, 2017)
- Racial Justice in the Age of Obama (Princeton University Press, 2009)
- Atonement and Forgiveness: A New Model for Black Reparations (University of California Press, 2004)
- When Sorry Isn't Enough: The Controversy over Apologies and Reparations for Human Injustice (editor, NYU Press, 1999) In this edited volume, Brooks introduces "The Age of Apology" concept, analyzing global patterns of state acknowledgment for historical wrongs.
- Integration or Separation?: A Strategy for Racial Equality (Harvard University Press, 1996)
- Rethinking the American Race Problem (University of California Press, 1990)

=== Selected book chapters and articles ===
- Brooks, Roy L. "Holocaust Redress: Its Effect on Slave Redress and Post-Conflict Justice." Redefining Reparations, edited by Lorena De Vita and Constantin Goschler (London: Routledge, 2025).
- Brooks, Roy L. "Framing Redress Discourse" in NOMOS LXV: Reconciliation and Repair, edited by Melissa Schwartzberg and Eric Beerbohm (New York: NYU Press, 2023).
- Brooks, Roy L. "Black boarding academies as a prudential reparation: finis origine pendet." Colum. J. Race & L. 13 (2023): 790.
- "The Anatomy of an Apology." Social Research: An International Quarterly. 87 (2020): 813.
- Brooks, Roy L. "Systemic Racism: Sociolegal and Sociocultural Implications." In Systemic Racism: Making Liberty, Justice, and Democracy Real, pp. 143–161. New York: Palgrave Macmillan US (2017).
- Brooks, Roy L. "Cultural diversity: It's all about the mainstream." The Monist 95, no. 1 (2012): 17–32.
- Brooks, Roy L., and Kirsten Widner. "In defense of the black/white binary: Reclaiming a tradition of civil rights scholarship." Berkeley J. Afr.-Am. L. & Pol'y 12 (2010): 107.
- Brooks, Roy L. "Making the case for atonement in post-racial America." J. Gender Race & Just. 14 (2010): 665.
- Brooks, Roy L. "Getting reparations for slavery right: Response to Posner and Vermeule." Notre Dame L. Rev. 80 (2004): 251.
- Brooks, Roy L. "The age of apology." When sorry isn't enough: The controversy over apologies and reparations for human injustice (1999): 3–12.
- Brooks, Roy L. "Critical race theory: A proposed structure and application to federal pleading." Harv. BlackLetter LJ 11 (1994): 85.
- Brooks, Roy L., and Mary Jo Newborn. "Critical race theory and classical-liberal civil rights scholarship: A distinction without a difference." Cal L. Rev. 82 (1994): 787.

== Awards and honors ==
- Gustavus Myers Outstanding Book Award (twice)
- Brandeis University Library Learned Research Journal Award
- Thurgood Marshall Award
- Virgil Hawkins Award
- USD Thorsnes Prize for Excellence in Scholarship (four times)
- USD Thorsnes Prize for Excellence in Teaching (four times)
- USD Diversity and Inclusion Impact Award (2023)

== See also ==
- Critical race theory
- Reparations for slavery
- Civil rights movement
- University of San Diego School of Law
