= Susan Low Bloch =

American constitutional lawyer and academic

Susan Low Bloch is an American professor specializing in Constitutional law and communications law at Georgetown University Law Center, who is widely quoted in the press on her interpretation of the Constitution of the United States.

== Biography ==
Bloch received her B.A. from Smith College in 1966 with Phi Beta Kappa honors. She then pursued graduate studies in mathematics and computer science at the University of Michigan, receiving M.A. degrees in 1968 and 1972. She earned her J.D. in 1975, graduating first in her class, summa cum laude and Order of the Coif from University of Michigan Law School, where she was notes editor of the Michigan Law Review. Following graduation, she served as a clerk for Judge Spottswood Robinson III of the United States Court of Appeals for the District of Columbia and during the 1976 Term for Thurgood Marshall of the Supreme Court of the United States.

In 1982, Bloch joined the faculty of the Georgetown University Law Center as an assistant professor. She has served on the District of Columbia Bar Board of Governors, American Law Institute and United States Supreme Court Historical Society.

Her co-authored case books include Inside the Supreme Court: The Institution and Its Procedures and Supreme Court Politics: The Institution and Its Procedures. In 2013, she co-wrote with Vicki C. Jackson, Federalism: A Reference Guide to the United States Constitution.

== Personal life ==
In 1966, she married attorney Richard Bloch, and they have two children who are both lawyers.

== See also ==
- List of law clerks for the tenth seat of the Supreme Court of the United States

== Selected publications ==
- Bloch, Susan Low (December 1992). "The Privilege of Clerking for Thurgood Marshall". Journal of Supreme Court History. 17 (1): 23–25. doi:10.1111/j.1540-5818.1992.tb00073.x. S2CID 145082247.
