= Racial Justice in the Age of Obama =

2009 book by Roy L. Brooks

- Cover
- Author: Roy L. Brooks
- Language: English
- Subject: Civil rights, Race relations, African Americans, Political science
- Genre: Non-fiction
- Publisher: Princeton University Press
- Publication date: 2009
- Publication place: United States
- Pages: 234
- ISBN: 978-0-691-14198-5
- OCLC: 2009000587
- Dewey Decimal: 305.800973
- LC Class: E185.615.B7297 2009

Racial Justice in the Age of Obama is a 2009 book by American legal scholar Roy L. Brooks. The work analyzes civil rights theory in the United States during the post-civil rights era, focusing on African Americans. Brooks presents four major theoretical approaches to racial justice that emerged since the 1970s: traditionalism, reformism, limited separation, and critical race theory. He introduces a framework he calls the "theory of completeness," which posits that comprehensive civil rights theories must address both external (structural) and internal (behavioral) factors that sustain racial disparities. He investigates the paradox of persistent racial inequality alongside historic achievements such as the election of Barack Obama as the first African American president, and proposes a synthesis of existing theories combined with specific policy recommendations including educational reforms and economic programs targeted at reducing resource disparities between black and white Americans.

== Summary ==
Brooks traces the evolution of civil rights theory in the United States during the post-civil rights era, centering on the challenges facing African Americans from the early 1970s through the Obama presidency. He develops what he terms a "theory of completeness" to analyze and critique contemporary approaches to racial justice, arguing that any comprehensive civil rights theory must address both external (structural) and internal (behavioral) factors that sustain racial disparities.

Brooks opens with a personal reflection on his experiences at Yale Law School in the early 1970s, where students gathered at what they called the "Black Table" to discuss civil rights theory. This setting serves as a metaphor for the intellectual rigor and respectful disagreement that Brooks advocates throughout the work. The introduction establishes the book's focus on African Americans rather than all minority groups, as he explains that blacks have a unique historical relationship to slavery and Jim Crow laws that distinguishes their civil rights challenges from those of other groups. Brooks defines the American race problem as "disparate resources" between black and white Americans, documented extensively through statistical data on poverty, income, education, employment, incarceration, and other socioeconomic indicators presented in the appendix.

The core of the book presents four distinct post-civil rights theories. The chapter on traditionalism examines the perspective that cultural factors within the black community, rather than racism, primarily sustain racial disparities in contemporary America. Traditionalists argue that behaviors such as out-of-wedlock births, low academic achievement, and crime represent internal problems requiring individual transformation rather than government intervention. The reformism chapter presents the opposing view that race continues to matter significantly in American society. Reformists identify both "frontstage" and "backstage" racism, along with institutional discrimination, as external factors perpetuating inequality, while acknowledging that these external forces condition internal problems, such as what Cornel West terms "black nihilism."

The limited separation chapter explores theories of racial solidarity that question the emphasis on integration as the primary vehicle for achieving racial justice. Limited separatists argue that integration depletes resources from black communities and forces blacks to conform to white cultural standards, advocating instead for legally sanctioned black institutions that do not exclude whites. The critical race theory chapter analyzes the most radical perspective, which views racial subordination as deeply embedded in American social structures through both material conditions and cultural narratives that privilege whites while marginalizing blacks.

In the epilogue, titled “Toward the 'Best' post-civil rights theory,” Brooks states his “ambition at the moment is to move the discussion forward, toward the discovery of the ‘best’ post-civil rights theory for African Americans,” rather than trying to develop his own complete theory. His approach resembles that of a teacher who, instead of telling students what he thinks the “best” is, sets forth principles to help them think independently in a nonpartisan way. One principle asserts that no single existing post-civil rights theory is fully complete or adequate on its own. An integration of ideas is necessary, based on areas of theoretical agreement (such as programs like KIPP Academies and the Harlem Children’s Zone). The “best” theory must also recognize both the external reality of ongoing discrimination and internal challenges within black communities. Ultimately, the “best” solution for racial justice should begin with a normative stance centered on moral clarity before political compromise, aligning contemporary theorists with figures like Frederick Douglass and Martin Luther King Jr., whose visions were initially seen as politically impossible but ultimately shaped our civil rights laws and policies. Brooks believes these “how-to” principles will give readers enough guidance to develop their own theories, including their own way of defining the “best” theory.

== Reviews ==
In his review, Andrew Valls praised Brooks' discussion as "extremely informative" with "engaging" writing that imposed "needed order on what might otherwise be an unwieldy set of literatures." Valls found Brooks' framework useful, and considered that even readers familiar with the topics would "learn a great deal," while those unfamiliar would discover "an accessible yet nuanced introduction." Valls commended Brooks' insistence that Americans must think morally about racial issues before considering political compromises, and called Brooks "surely right" on this point. Though the reviewer acknowledged the book did not itself provide a complete theory of racial justice—something Brooks himself admitted—Valls saw the work as making an important contribution toward that goal. He considered minor flaws, such as the brevity of the epilogue which attempted to synthesize four perspectives, insufficient to diminish the book's value in advancing the conversation about racial justice.

Maribel Morey regarded Brooks' framework as imperfect, pointing out considerable disagreement among adherents within each perspective and noting that individual thinkers sometimes appeared "shoehorned into a preconceived category." Morey questioned whether Brooks' categories represented broadly held viewpoints or merely individual perspectives. She found the epilogue's attempt to synthesize the four perspectives disappointingly brief, stating Brooks' prescriptions weren't "spelled out in sufficient detail" to assess their attractiveness or viability against racial inequality in America. However, Morey particularly praised the data-filled appendix—which she deemed "worth the price of the book"—though she expressed hope the epilogue would lead to more comprehensive discussion. Morey also acknowledged Brooks' discussion was highly informative, and believed that his framework brought order to complex literatures and provided those unfamiliar with the material "an accessible yet nuanced introduction."

C. Fraser Smith characterized the book as arriving at a moment "diametrically opposed to the post-election euphoria of 2008," when many believed society had moved beyond racial divisions. Smith believed that Brooks achieved a post-racial perspective by presenting different viewpoints on race from various perspectives, hence allowing readers to form their own conclusions about whether Obama's election signaled racism's end. He considered that Brooks' use of recent events effective—such as Representative Joe Wilson's outburst during Obama's healthcare speech and the subsequent debate over illegal immigrant coverage, as evidence supporting both optimistic and pessimistic views about racial progress. Smith emphasized Brooks' central argument that while a post-racial society had not been achieved, maintaining dialogue about race represented valuable progress. The reviewer thought that Brooks posed important questions about race in America, though he suggested the work raised these questions more than it definitively answered them.

Daniel N. Lipson considered the book successful in its primary aim of describing and evaluating four competing theories of racial justice, and described it as "comprehensive and methodical" in its evaluation. However, Lipson considered the epilogue "quite underdeveloped," where Brooks attempted to advance his own normative approach through amalgamating the four theories. While acknowledging Brooks' creative proposals—such as federal tax credits for positive media portrayals of African Americans and $75,000 starting salaries for teachers in predominantly black schools—Lipson criticized these ideas as "still very much under-theorized and incomplete." He questioned the practical implementation of these proposals, asking "Who in government would decide which films and television shows portray positive and truthful images of African Americans, and based on what criteria?" Still, Lipson recommended the book for courses in political science, sociology, and African American Studies, and praised its "excellent, balanced summary, critique, and synthesis of the central approaches to racial justice."
