= Rebecca Latham Brown =

American lawyer

- Born: Santa Fe, New Mexico, U.S.
- Title: The Rader Family Trustee Chair in Law; Newton Professor of Constitutional Law; Allen Chair in Law

Academic background
- Education: St. John's College (B.A., 1980); Georgetown University Law Center (J.D., 1984)

Academic work
- Discipline: Constitutional law

Rebecca Latham Brown is an American law professor who is The Rader Family Trustee Chair in Law specializing in constitutional law at USC Gould School of Law.

== Biography ==
Brown was raised in Santa Fe, New Mexico, and received her B.A. from St. John's College (Annapolis, MD) in 1980. She earned her J.D. in 1984, graduating magna cum laude from Georgetown University Law Center, where she was the articles editor of the Georgetown Law Journal. Following graduation, she served as a clerk for Judge Spottswood Robinson III of the United States Court of Appeals for the District of Columbia and during the 1985-1986 Term for Thurgood Marshall of the Supreme Court of the United States.

After her clerkships, Brown worked in the Office of Legal Counsel in the U.S. Department of Justice. She then entered private practice with Onek, Klein & Farr in Washington, D.C. From 1988 to 2008, she was a professor at Vanderbilt University Law School, where in 2003 she was named to the Allen Chair in Law.

In 2008, Brown joined the faculty of the USC Gould Law School as Newton Professor of Constitutional Law, and in 2014 was named The Rader Family Trustee Chair in Law.

== Personal life ==
Brown is married to Robert K. Rasmussen, a professor of bankruptcy law who was dean of the USC Gould School of Law from 2007 to 2015.

== See also ==
- List of law clerks for the tenth seat of the Supreme Court of the United States

== Selected publications ==
=== Books ===
- Brown, Rebecca; Gerhardt, Michael J.; Rowe, Jr., Thomas D.; Spann, Girardeau (2000). Constitutional Theory: Arguments and Perspectives (2nd ed.). Lexis Press.

=== Journals ===
- Brown, Rebecca (2017). "Judicial Supremacy and Taking Conflicting Rights Seriously" (PDF). William & Mary Law Review. 58 (1): 1433.
- Brown, Rebecca (2016). "The Harm Principle and Free Speech". Southern California Law Review. 89 (1): 953. SSRN 2584080.
