= Lindsay See =

American lawyer

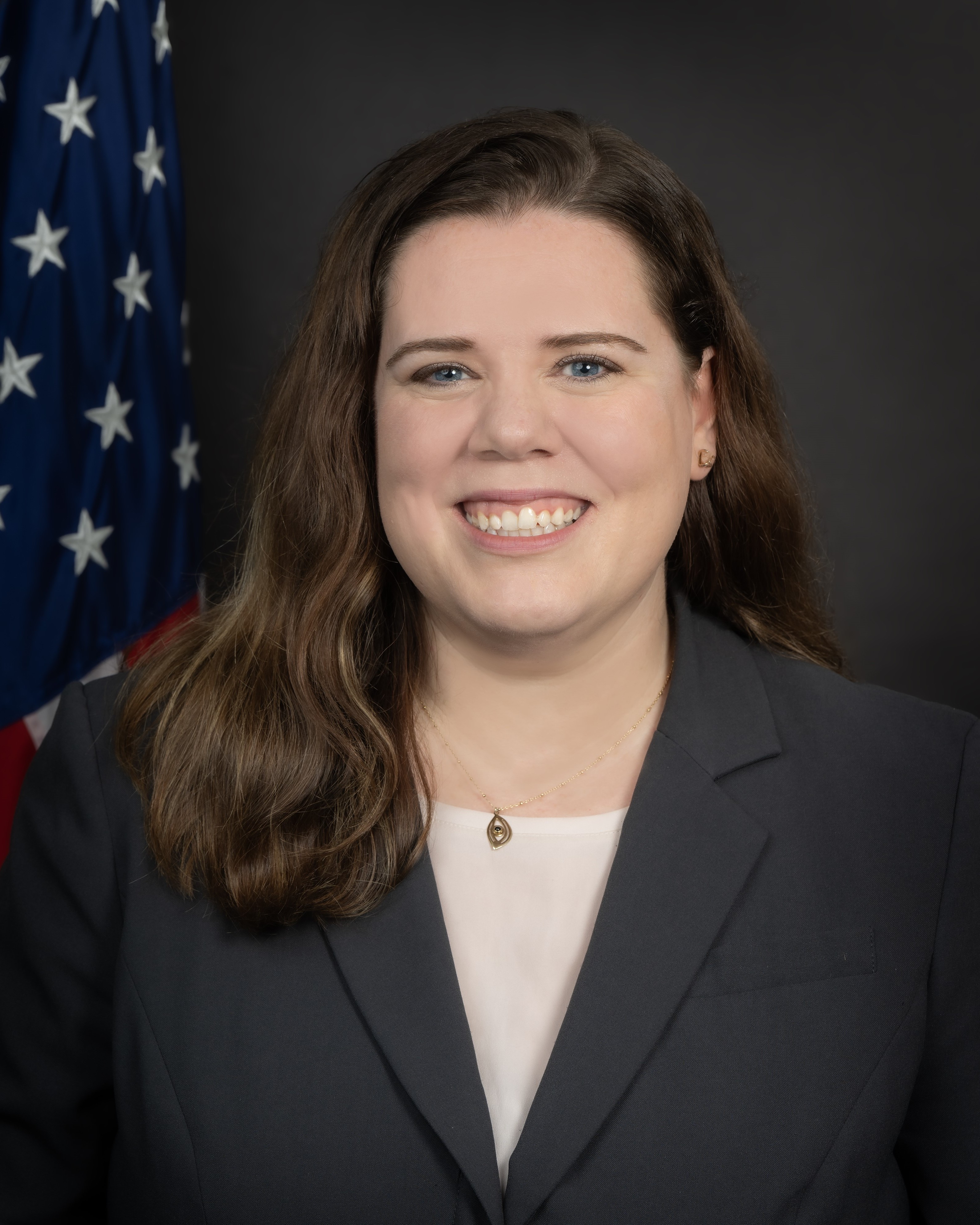
- Official portrait, 2024

Member of the Federal Energy Regulatory Commission
- Incumbent
- Assumed office June 28, 2024
- President: Joe Biden; Donald Trump
- Preceded by: James Danly

2nd Solicitor General of West Virginia
- In office 2018–2024
- Appointed by: Patrick Morrisey
- Preceded by: Elbert Lin
- Succeeded by: Michael Williams

Personal details
- Born: Lindsay Sara See Michigan, U.S.
- Party: Republican
- Education: Patrick Henry College (BA); Harvard University (JD)
- Occupation: Lawyer

Lindsay Sara See is an American lawyer. A Michigan native, she attended Patrick Henry College, followed by graduating magna cum laude at Harvard Law School, where she was executive editor of the Harvard Law Review. Beginning in 2018, she served as West Virginia's solicitor general. In 2024, President Joe Biden nominated her for one of the Republican seats on the Federal Energy Regulatory Commission, at the recommendation of Senate minority leader Mitch McConnell. The Senate confirmed her nomination by an 83-12 vote in June 2024. She previously clerked for Judge Thomas B. Griffith of the United States Court of Appeals for the District of Columbia Circuit and spent several years in the Washington, D.C. office of Gibson Dunn.
