= Margaret A. Ryan =

American judge (born 1964)

Meg Ryan
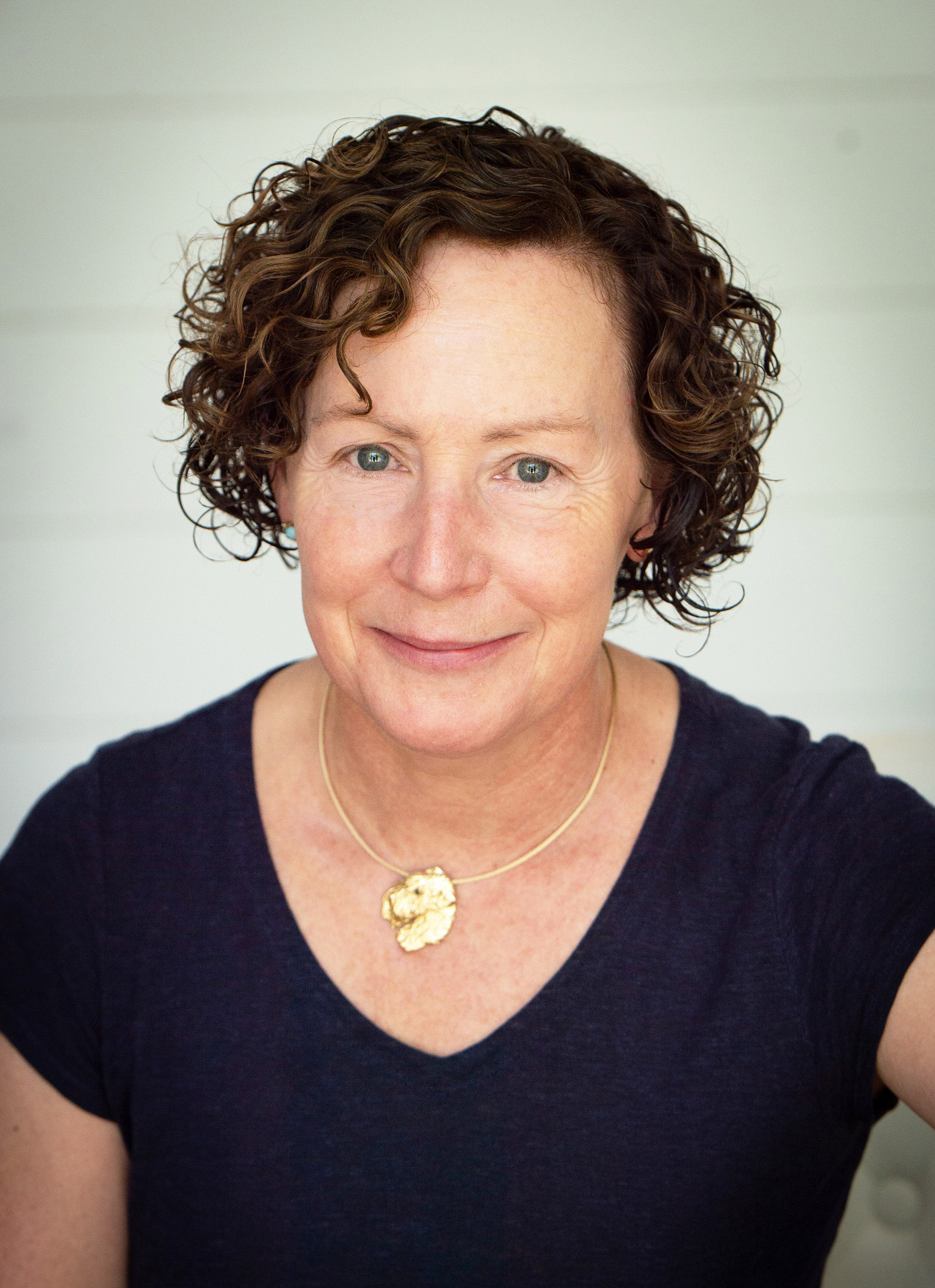

Senior Judge of the United States Court of Appeals for the Armed Forces
- Incumbent
- Assumed office July 31, 2020

Judge of the United States Court of Appeals for the Armed Forces
- In office December 20, 2006 – July 31, 2020
- Appointed by: George W. Bush
- Preceded by: Sparky Gierke
- Succeeded by: Liam P. Hardy

Personal details
- Born: May 23, 1964 (age 62) Chicago, Illinois, U.S.
- Spouse: Michael Collins
- Education: Knox College (BA); University of Notre Dame (JD)

Military service
- Allegiance: United States
- Branch/service: United States Marine Corps
- Years of service: 1987–1999
- Rank: Major
- Unit: II Marine Expeditionary Force; III Marine Expeditionary Force
- Battles/wars: Gulf War
- Awards: Meritorious Service Medal; Navy and Marine Corps Commendation Medal; Navy and Marine Corps Achievement Medal

Margaret Ann "Meg" Ryan (born May 23, 1964) is a senior judge of the United States Court of Appeals for the Armed Forces. She joined the court in 2006 after being nominated by President George W. Bush. Her term expired on July 31, 2020.

== Early life and education ==
Born in Chicago, Ryan attended Homewood-Flossmoor High School, and graduated from Knox College with a Bachelor of Arts degree in political science in 1985. Ryan attended law school under the Marine Corps Law Education Program at the University of Notre Dame Law School, where she also was a member of the Notre Dame Law Review. She received her Juris Doctor degree, summa cum laude, in 1995 and was awarded the Colonel William J. Hoynes Award as valedictorian of her class.

== Career ==
Following graduation from Knox College, Ryan served on active duty for the United States Marine Corps from 1988 to 1992, and again following Law School graduation as a judge advocate from 1995 to 1999. Ryan served in units within the II & III Marine Expeditionary Forces as a Staff Officer, Company Commander, Platoon Commander, and Operations Officer. Judge Ryan's tours included deployments to the Philippines, during a coup attempt, and to Saudi Arabia during Desert Shield and Desert Storm. As a Judge Advocate General (JAG) officer, Ryan served as a Trial Counsel and Chief Trial Counsel in Okinawa, Japan and Quantico, Virginia. Ryan was then selected by General Charles C. Krulak, Commandant of the Marine Corps, to serve as his Aide de Camp.

Ryan was law clerk to Judge J. Michael Luttig of the United States Court of Appeals for the Fourth Circuit, and then to Justice Clarence Thomas of the United States Supreme Court for the 2001–2002 term.

Prior to joining the court, Ryan was in private practice. She was at Wiley Rein LLP from 2004 until her appointment to the court. Before that she was with Bartlit Beck Herman Palenchar & Scott from 2002 to 2004 and Cooper, Carvin & Rosenthal from 1999 to 2000.

Judge Ryan is currently a Lecturer on Law at Harvard Law School and an elected member of the American Law Institute. She previously served as the J.J. Clynes Endowed Visiting Professor of Law at Notre Dame Law School, where she taught Evidence, Military Law, and Constitutional Issues in the Military Justice System. She has also taught as an adjunct at the University of Georgia Law School and the George Washington University Law School.

=== Court of Appeals service ===
Ryan was nominated to the United States Court of Appeals for the Armed Forces by President George W. Bush on November 15, 2006, to replace Judge H. F. Gierke III, who retired September 30, 2006. She was confirmed less than a month later by the U.S. Senate on December 9, 2006, by unanimous consent. Ryan's appointment for a 15-year term was due to expire on July 31, 2021. However, the Court of Appeals for the Armed Forces website as of 2017 indicated that Judge Ryan's term would end on July 31, 2020.

In 2012, Judge Ryan joined the court majority that found that it did not have jurisdiction to order disclosure of trial documents from the Chelsea Manning court-martial. When the court majority reversed the conviction of a soldier for attempting suicide, Judge Ryan dissented, arguing that the appeals court did not have jurisdiction.

In September 2016, Ryan was named as a possible nominee to the Supreme Court of the United States by Republican presidential candidate Donald Trump.

== Personal life ==
Ryan is married to Michael J. Collins.

== See also ==
- List of law clerks for the tenth seat of the Supreme Court of the United States
- Donald Trump Supreme Court candidates

Legal offices
Preceded by Sparky Gierke	Judge of the United States Court of Appeals for the Armed Forces; 2006–2020	Succeeded by Liam P. Hardy
