= Sondra E. Berchin =

American lawyer (1952–2004)

Sondra Ellen Berchin (March 23, 1952 – December 8, 2004) was an American entertainment and corporate lawyer in Los Angeles, California who rose to serve as a senior executive at film studio, MCA Universal.

== Biography ==
Berchin was raised in Los Angeles, where her father, Eugene C. Berchin, and uncle, Jerome J. Berchin, were both attorneys at Berchin & Berchin in Beverly Hills, California. She was educated at University High School in West Los Angeles. Berchin earned her J.D. in 1977, graduating first in her class from UCLA Law School where she was articles editor of the UCLA Law Review. Following graduation, she served as a clerk for Judge James L. Oakes of the United States Court of Appeals for the Second Circuit and during the 1978 Term for Thurgood Marshall of the Supreme Court of the United States. She was the first UCLA Law School graduate to clerk at the U.S. Supreme Court.

Returning to California after her clerkships, Berchin entered private practice with Rosenfeld, Meyer & Susman, in Beverly Hills, where she became a partner and specialized in copyright law, entertainment contracts, and related litigation.

In November 1985, Berchin became vice president of business affairs at MCA Home Entertainment Group, a division of MCA, Inc., and in September 1987 was promoted to executive vice president. In August 1993, she resigned to start her own consulting practice.

== Personal life ==
In 1997, she married Michael S. Stammer.

== See also ==
- List of law clerks for the tenth seat of the Supreme Court of the United States

== Selected publications ==
- Berchin, Sondra (June 1976). "Comment: Regulation of Land Use: From Magna Carta to a Just Formulation". UCLA Law Review. 23 (5): 904.
