= Peter K. Leisure =

American judge

Senior Judge of the United States District Court for the Southern District of New York
- In office March 21, 1997 – September 17, 2013

Judge of the United States District Court for the Southern District of New York
- In office June 15, 1984 – March 21, 1997
- Appointed by: Ronald Reagan
- Preceded by: Milton Pollack
- Succeeded by: William H. Pauley III

Personal details
- Born: Peter Keeton Leisure; March 21, 1929 New York City, New York, U.S.
- Died: September 17, 2013 (aged 84) New York City, New York, U.S.
- Education: Yale University (BA); Columbia University; University of Virginia (LLB)

Peter Keeton Leisure (March 21, 1929 – September 17, 2013) was a United States district judge of the United States District Court for the Southern District of New York.

== Education and career ==
Born in New York City, New York, Leisure received a Bachelor of Arts degree from Yale University in 1952 and attended Columbia Law School, but was in the United States Army as an artillery lieutenant from 1953 to 1955. He received a Bachelor of Laws from the University of Virginia School of Law in 1958. He was in private practice in New York City from 1958 to 1961. He was an Assistant United States Attorney of the Southern District of New York from 1962 to 1966. He was in private practice in New York City from 1966 to 1984.

== Federal judicial service ==
Leisure was nominated by President Ronald Reagan on May 25, 1984, to a seat on the United States District Court for the Southern District of New York vacated by Judge Milton Pollack. He was confirmed by the United States Senate on June 15, 1984, and received commission the same day. He assumed senior status on March 21, 1997, and took inactive senior status in 2010.

== Death ==
Leisure died of complications of pneumonia on September 17, 2013, in Manhattan.

== Sources ==
Legal offices
Preceded by Milton Pollack	Judge of the United States District Court for the Southern District of New York; 1984–1997	Succeeded by William H. Pauley III
