= Dennis Jacobs =

American judge (born 1944)

Senior Judge of the United States Court of Appeals for the Second Circuit
- Incumbent
- Assumed office May 31, 2019

Chief Judge of the United States Court of Appeals for the Second Circuit
- In office October 1, 2006 – August 31, 2013
- Preceded by: John M. Walker, Jr.
- Succeeded by: Robert Katzmann

Judge of the United States Court of Appeals for the Second Circuit
- In office October 2, 1992 – May 31, 2019
- Appointed by: George H. W. Bush
- Preceded by: Wilfred Feinberg
- Succeeded by: Steven Menashi

Personal details
- Born: Dennis Jacobs; February 28, 1944 (age 81) New York City, New York, U.S.
- Education: Queens College (BA); New York University (MA, JD)

Dennis G. Jacobs (born February 28, 1944) is a senior United States circuit judge of the United States Court of Appeals for the Second Circuit.

== Education and career ==
Born and raised in New York City, Jacobs graduated from Forest Hills High School in Forest Hills, Queens, and from Queens College of the City University of New York with a Bachelor of Arts degree in 1964. He received a Master of Arts in English literature from New York University Graduate School of Arts and Science in 1965. From 1967 to 1968, Jacobs was a lecturer in the English Department of Queens College. In 1973, he earned his Juris Doctor from the New York University School of Law, where he served on the Law Review and was a Pomeroy Scholar. He was in private practice from 1973 with the New York law firm of Simpson Thacher & Bartlett, serving as a partner there from 1980 until his judicial appointment.

== Federal judicial service ==
In 1992, President George H. W. Bush nominated Jacobs to serve on the United States Court of Appeals for the Second Circuit, vacated by Judge Wilfred Feinberg. Jacobs was confirmed by the United States Senate on September 29, 1992, and received his commission on October 2, 1992. He served as Chief Judge of the Second Circuit from October 1, 2006 to August 31, 2013. He assumed senior status on May 31, 2019.

== Awards and honors ==
Jacobs has been awarded the Learned Hand Award for Excellence in Federal Jurisprudence by the Federal Bar Council (2003); the Eugene J. Keogh Award for distinguished public service by New York University (2004); the Outstanding Public Service Award by the New York Intellectual Property Law Association (2009); and the James Madison Award by the Federalist Society. An honorary degree of doctor of laws was conferred in 2009 by St. John's University.

== Judicial Conference service ==
In 1997, Jacobs was appointed by the Chief Justice of the United States to the Judicial Resources Committee of the United States Judicial Conference; Judge Jacobs chaired that committee in the years 1999-2004. The committee has jurisdiction over personnel policy, compensation and benefits for the employees of the Third Branch, and jurisdiction over the need to create new federal judgeships in the various district and appellate courts of the United States. As chair of that committee, Jacobs directed implementation of the employee dispute resolution program by which discrimination claims are resolved within the Third Branch, and he testified in Congress on the need to revamp benefits for the employees of the judiciary and on the need for new judgeships to deal with rising case loads.

In 2021, the Chief Justice appointed Jacobs to the Committee on Codes of Conduct, which has jurisdiction to provide advice regarding the application of the Codes of Conduct for United States Judges, Judicial Employees, and Federal Public Defender Employees, as well as Judicial Conference regulations including the Regulations on Gifts. The committee provides confidential advice to federal judges and judicial employees regarding compliance with their ethical obligations and publishes advisory opinions to assist in the interpretation of the Codes and regulations.

== Speeches ==
In 2006, Jacobs delivered a speech entitled "The Secret Life Of Judges" as the 2006 John F. Sonnett Memorial Lecture at Fordham University School of Law. The subsequently published manuscript won a Green Bag Award for exemplary legal writing in the short article category.

Jacobs has also delivered two speeches expressing concern about what he views as a disconnect between the military and the legal elite. The first speech was entitled “The Military and the Law Elite” and was delivered at Cornell Law School in 2009. The second was entitled “Lawyers at War” and was delivered in Washington, D.C., in 2012 as the 10th Annual Barbara K. Olson Memorial Lecture.

== Notable decisions ==
- United States v. Bescond, 24 F.4th 759 (2d Cir. 2021). Reversed an order disentitling a defendant charged with violating the Commodity Exchange Act. Citing the collateral order doctrine, Judge Jacobs held that the district court abused its discretion when it disentitled a French citizen whose alleged unlawful conduct occurred entirely outside the United States. The defendant was not a fugitive because she had “neither fled nor concealed herself.”
- Cavello Bay Reinsurance Ltd. v. Shubin Stein, 986 F.3d 161 (2d Cir. 2021). Affirmed dismissal of a claim under § 10(b) of the Securities Exchange Act of 1934. The plaintiff, a Bermudan company, alleged misrepresentation of a fee structure after purchasing shares in a Bermudan holding company. Judge Jacobs held that the claims were “so predominantly foreign” and that “even if a transaction occurs in the United States, the features and incidents of the transaction may nevertheless be so foreign that it is not regulated by § 10(b).”
- Halleck v. Manhattan Cmty. Access Corp., 882 F.3d 300 (2d Cir. 2018). Judge Jacobs dissented in part from a ruling holding that public access television channels were public forums and therefore bound by the First Amendment. Judge Jacobs reasoned that the defendant was a private entity and not a state actor under the “public function” test, writing “it is not at all a near-exclusive function of the state to provide the forums for public expression, politics, information, or entertainment.” The U.S. Supreme Court reversed the majority (siding with Judge Jacobs) in Manhattan Cmty. Access Corp. v. Halleck, 139 S. Ct. 1921 (2019), holding that the operator of the public access channels was not a state actor.
- Kiobel by Samkalden v. Cravath, Swaine & Moore LLP, 895 F.3d 238 (2d Cir. 2018). Reversed grant of a § 1782 petition to subpoena documents from a U.S. law firm. In her lawsuit against Royal Dutch Shell in the Netherlands, the petitioner sought documents from discovery in a prior U.S. lawsuit. Judge Jacobs held that such a petition should not be granted “for documents held by a U.S. law firm in its role as counsel for a foreign client if the documents are undiscoverable from the client abroad, because this would disturb attorney-client communications and relations.”
- Fox News Network, LLC v. Tveyes, Inc., 883 F.3d 169 (2d Cir. 2018). TVEyes, Inc. had a service that provided clips of Fox content. Fox, the copyright holder, sued for infringement. Rejecting application of the fair use doctrine, Judge Jacobs ruled in favor of Fox on the ground that TVEyes was “unlawfully profiting off the work of others by commercially re-distributing all of that work that a viewer wishes to use, without payment or license.”
- In re Payment Card Interchange Fee and Merch. Disc. Antitrust Litig., 827 F.3d 223 (2d Cir. 2016). Vacated class certification and reversed approval of a settlement in an antitrust action involving two classes – one seeking damages and the other equitable relief. Ruling that the class certification was a violation of due process and Federal Rule of Civil Procedure 23(a)(4), Judge Jacobs held that “[u]nitary representation of separate classes that claim distinct, competing, and conflicting relief create unacceptable incentives for counsel to trade benefits to one class for benefits to the other in order somehow to reach a settlement.”
- Apotex Inc. v. Acorda Therapeutics, Inc., 823 F.3d 51 (2d Cir. 2016). Affirmed dismissal of an antitrust claim brought by a drug manufacturer against a competitor firm, which alleged that a “sham citizen petition” was filed with the Food and Drug Administration. Judge Jacobs also affirmed grant of summary judgment in favor of the defendant on false advertising claims on the ground that “representations commensurate with information in an FDA label generally cannot form the basis for Lanham Act liability.”
- Fed. Treasury Enter. Sojuzplodoimport v. Spirits Int’l B.V., 809 F.3d 737 (2d Cir. 2016). Vacated, in part, the dismissal of trademark infringement claims for lack of standing. Judge Jacobs held that “the doctrines of comity and act of state preclude a United States court from invalidating an action of a foreign sovereign with respect to a transfer of rights among its branches or entities on the ground that the transfer is invalid under the law of that foreign sovereign.”
- Noll v. Int’l Bus. Machs. Corp., 787 F.3d 89 (2d Cir. 2015). Held that an employer’s provision of transcripts and ASL interpreters to a deaf employee constituted reasonable accommodations under the American Disabilities Act and New York state law. Judge Jacobs further ruled that the federal law “imposes no liability for an employer’s failure to explore alternative accommodations when the accommodations provided to the employee were plainly reasonable.”
- Liberty Mut. Ins. Co. v. Donegan, 746 F.3d 497 (2d Cir. 2014) (affirmed by the U.S. Supreme Court in Gobeille v. Liberty Mut. Ins. Co., 577 U.S. 312 (2016)). Held that a Vermont statute and implementing regulation, which required health insurers to file information concerning insurance claims with a state agency, were preempted by the federal ERISA law. Judge Jacobs ruled that “[t]he trend toward narrowing ERISA preemption does not allow one of ERISA’s core functions—reporting—to be laden with burdens, subjected to incompatible, multiple and variable demands, and freighted with risk of fines, breach of duty, and legal expense.”
- Kovacs v. United States, 744 F.3d 44 (2d Cir. 2014). Reversed denial of a petition for writ of coram nobis, directing on remand issuance of the writ and vacatur of the petitioner’s conviction. The petitioner alleged ineffective assistance of counsel after being convicted of misprision of felony. Judge Jacobs held that “a defense lawyer’s incorrect advice about the immigration consequences of a plea is prejudicial if it is shown that, but for counsel’s unprofessional errors, there was a reasonable probability that the petitioner could have negotiated a plea that did not impact immigration status or that he would have litigated an available defense.”
- Gonzalez v. City of Schenectady, 728 F.3d 149 (2d Cir. 2013). Affirmed grant of summary judgment in favor of municipal entities and officials in a § 1983 action. The defendant alleged that law enforcement violated his Fourth Amendment rights following a visual body cavity search. Judge Jacobs held that the search did not violate “a clearly established federal constitutional rule,” and that “a reasonable officer . . . would not have understood that conducting an otherwise suspicionless visual body cavity search of a person arrested for a felony drug offense was unlawful.”
- Lundy v. Cath. Health Sys. of Long Island, Inc., 711 F.3d 106 (2d Cir. 2013). Affirmed dismissal of healthcare workers’ claims alleging violations of the Fair Labor Standards Act (FLSA) for lack of compensation “for time worked during meal breaks.” Judge Jacobs ruled that “to state a plausible FLSA overtime claim, a plaintiff must sufficiently allege 40 hours of work in a given workweek as well as some uncompensated time in excess of the 40 hours” and that “FLSA does not provide for a gap-time claim even when an employee has worked overtime.”
- Windsor v. United States, 12-2335-cv(L); 12-2435 (2d Cir. 2012). Held that the Defense of Marriage Act's classification of same-sex spouses was not substantially related to an important government interest, Section 3 of DOMA violates equal protection and is therefore unconstitutional. The Court held that laws that classify people based on sexual orientation, like DOMA, should be subject to intermediate scrutiny.
- United States v. Ferguson, 653 F.3d 61 (2d Cir. 2011). Vacated the convictions of five business executives who were charged with securities fraud in connection with an allegedly sham reinsurance transaction. Judge Jacobs held that the district court improperly admitted charts showing a decline in AIG's stock price following the revelation of the fraud, which was unduly prejudicial because [i] loss causation was not an element of the charged offenses and [ii] the government's use of the evidence “fell outside the natural sequence of what the defendants were charged with thinking and doing” and was “exploited . . . to emphasize the losses caused by the transaction.”
- United States v. Wilson, 610 F.3d 168 (2d Cir. 2010). Vacated the defendant's death sentences and remanded the case to the district court for resentencing. Judge Jacobs held that statements made by the prosecution during the sentencing phase of the trial concerning the defendant's failure to plead guilty or to take the stand at trial violated the defendant's Sixth Amendment right to a jury trial, and in combination with the district court's refusal to give a Carter no-adverse-inference jury instruction, violated the defendant's Fifth Amendment right not to testify at trial.
- Arar v. Ashcroft, 585 F.3d 559 (2d Cir. 2009) (en banc). Held that there was no claim for damages against federal employees under Bivens v. Six Unknown Named Agents of Federal Bureau of Narcotics, 403 U.S. 388 (1971), based on an allegation of extraordinary rendition. Judge Jacobs held that “‘special factors’—such as judicial hesitance to intrude in national security affairs, the importance of maintaining the security of classified information, an interest in the appearance of openness in the court system, and the potential for graymail” counseled against implying a private right of action in this context.
- United States v. Finnerty, 533 F.3d 143 (2d Cir. 2008). Affirmed a judgment of acquittal entered by the district court following a jury's guilty verdict against a specialist on the New York Stock Exchange charged with securities fraud. Judge Jacobs held that the defendant's alleged interpositioning (trading for his own account ahead of his customers’), in violation of New York Stock Exchange rules, did not provide a basis for criminal liability under § 10(b) of the Securities Exchange Act. Judge Jacobs concluded that the defendant's conduct did not involve the requisite “deception,” because he did not convey an impression that was misleading to his customers; and the government otherwise failed to produce “proof of manipulation or a false statement, breach of a duty to disclose, or deceptive communicative conduct.”
- Husain v. Springer, 494 F.3d 108 (2d Cir. 2007). Plaintiffs brought a § 1983 claim alleging that their First Amendment rights were violated when President Springer of the College of Staten Island canceled a student government election. The district court granted summary judgment in favor of President Springer on qualified immunity grounds. The majority vacated that ruling, holding that there were “disputed issues of material fact regarding President Springer’s reliance on the [school’s] election rules.” Judge Jacobs dissented in part, explaining that President Springer was entitled to qualified immunity because her “decision to re-run the election was . . . not unreasonable in light of clearly established law.”
- Lentell v. Merrill Lynch, 396 F.3d 161 (2d Cir. 2005). Clarified the requirements for pleading loss causation in securities fraud cases. The plaintiffs claimed that research reports recommending the purchase of shares were materially misleading. Judge Jacobs held that the plaintiffs had not adequately pleaded loss causation because they failed to plead facts showing that the materialization of the allegedly concealed risks caused the stock price declines that led to plaintiffs’ losses.
- United States v. Handakas, 286 F.3d 92 (2d Cir. 2002). Held that 19 U.S.C. §1346, which criminalizes “honest services” fraud, was unconstitutionally vague. Judge Jacobs concluded that the ambiguous statute did not give notice of the forbidden conduct to laymen, or set boundaries to prosecutorial discretion. In 2010, the Supreme Court invoked the constitutional avoidance doctrine to narrow the scope of §1346 to cover only bribery and kickback schemes. Skilling v. United States, 130 S. Ct. 2896 (2010).
- Yurman Design, Inc., v. PAJ, Inc., 262 F.3d 101 (2d Cir. 2001). Reversed a jury verdict in favor of the plaintiff against a rival jewelry company for trade dress infringement under the Lanham Act, holding that the claim must be dismissed as a matter of law because the plaintiff failed to identify specific elements of its trade dress, and therefore failed to meet the heightened burden of proving distinctiveness imposed on product design plaintiffs under the Lanham Act.
- Harrison v. Barkley, 219 F.3d 132 (2d Cir. 2000). Held that prison personnel did not enjoy qualified immunity when they refused to treat an inmate's dental cavity unless he consented to the extraction of another tooth. Judge Jacobs held that there was a genuine issue of material fact as to whether the defendants’ refusal to treat the plaintiff constituted deliberate indifference to serious medical needs in violation of the Eighth Amendment.
- Baker v. Dorfman, 239 F.3d 415 (2d Cir. 2000). Affirmed the district court judgment awarding the plaintiff damages for legal malpractice and fraud against his lawyer. Judge Jacobs concluded that the plaintiff suffered the loss of his claim due to the defendant's negligent untimely filings, and was induced to retain the defendant as counsel because his resume contained intentional and material misrepresentations.
- United States v. Lynch, 162 F.3d 732 (2d Cir. 1998). The Second Circuit voted not to re-hear this case en banc after holding that the Double Jeopardy Clause barred the government's appeal of the district court's judgment of acquittal under 18 U.S.C. §248. Although the district court acquitted the defendants based on its erroneous view that their sincerely held religious beliefs precluded a finding of willfulness, this determination was in its essential nature factual rather than legal and therefore Double Jeopardy applied.
- United States v. Ready, 82 F.3d 551 (2d Cir. 1996). Held that ambiguities in a plea agreement did not permit an inference that the parties intended it to preclude a criminal defendant's appeal of an illegally imposed restitution penalty. Judge Jacobs concluded that since plea agreements are properly construed as contracts, ambiguities therein should be construed strictly against the government.
- Tippins v. Walker, 77 F.3d 682 (2d Cir. 1996). Held that counsel's prolonged periods of sleeping during his client's criminal trial deprived the client of effective assistance in violation of his Sixth Amendment right to counsel. Judge Jacobs concluded that the criminal defendant suffered prejudice because “his counsel was repeatedly unconscious at trial for periods of time” during which his interests were at stake, and explained that “sleeping counsel is tantamount to no counsel at all.”
- Fisher v. Vassar College, 70 F.3d 1420 (2d Cir. 1995). Reversed the district court judgment awarding the plaintiff damages and attorney's fees on her age and gender discrimination claims. Judge Jacobs further held, and the in banc court later upheld, that the plaintiff was not entitled to attorney's fees because “only a ‘prevailing party may recover attorney’s fees and costs in a civil rights action,’” and the plaintiff prevailed on none of her discrimination claims, despite a finding of pretext.
- United States v. Yemitan, 70 F.3d 746 (2d Cir. 1995). Held that a criminal defendant’s appeal was foreclosed by his plea agreement. Judge Jacobs reasoned that plea agreements are construed according to contract principles; and since the defendant’s appeal did not present policy constraints sufficient to bear upon the enforcement of a contract, dismissal of the appeal was necessary to afford the prosecution the benefit of its bargain.
- Shields v. Citytrust Bancorp, Inc., 25 F.3d 1124 (2d Cir. 1994). Held that “the aggrieved holder of somewhat less than one share of stock in [the defendant]” failed to plead facts sufficient to raise the strong inference of fraud required to meet the specificity requirements for pleading fraud under Rule 9(b). Judge Jacobs held that executives in a corporation are entitled to be optimistic about their future earnings, and the fact that their predictions turn out to be wrong in hindsight is insufficient to establish scienter. Judge Jacobs also held that the requisite motive to give rise to an inference of fraudulent intent requires more than a general desire to “prolong the benefits of the positions” held by executives.

== Sources ==
- FJC Bio

Legal offices
Preceded by Wilfred Feinberg	Judge of the United States Court of Appeals for the Second Circuit; 1992–2019	Succeeded by Steven Menashi
Preceded by John M. Walker Jr.	Chief Judge of the United States Court of Appeals for the Second Circuit; 2006–2013	Succeeded by Robert Katzmann
