= Liam P. Hardy =

American judge (born 1973)

Liam Hardy
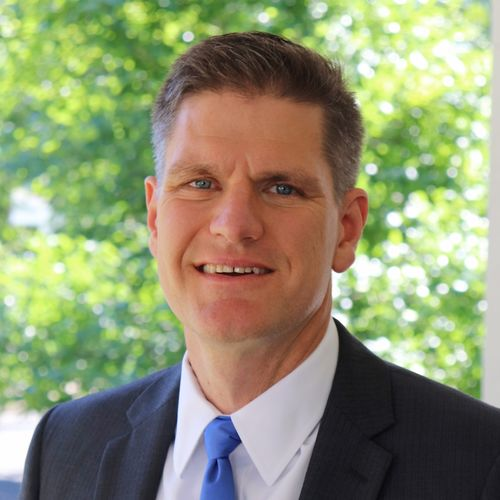

Judge of the United States Court of Appeals for the Armed Forces
- Incumbent
- Assumed office December 8, 2020
- Appointed by: Donald Trump
- Preceded by: Margaret A. Ryan

Personal details
- Born: Liam Patrick Hardy; 1973 (age 52–53)
- Education: Princeton University (BS); Stanford University (MS); Georgetown University (JD)

Liam Patrick Hardy (born 1973) is an American lawyer who serves as a judge of the United States Court of Appeals for the Armed Forces.

== Education ==
Hardy earned a Bachelor of Science in Engineering, magna cum laude, in May 1995 from Princeton University majoring in mechanical and aerospace engineering, a Master of Science in aeronautics and astronautics in June 1996 from Stanford University, and a Juris Doctor, cum laude, in May 2008 from Georgetown University Law Center, where he served as the senior administrative editor of The Georgetown Law Journal.

== Career ==
Upon graduation from law school, Hardy served as a law clerk to Judge Margaret A. Ryan of the United States Court of Appeals for the Armed Forces. He later served as a law clerk to Chief Judge David B. Sentelle of the United States Court of Appeals for the District of Columbia, and to Justice Clarence Thomas of the Supreme Court of the United States. Prior to joining the United States Department of Justice, he was a litigation partner in the Washington, D.C. office of Kirkland & Ellis. Hardy was a Deputy Assistant Attorney General for the Office of Legal Counsel. He also serves as a lecturer on law at Harvard Law School, and as an adjunct professor at Notre Dame Law School.

=== Court of appeals service ===
On May 6, 2020, President Donald Trump announced his intent to nominate Hardy to serve as a judge of the United States Court of Appeals for the Armed Forces. On May 21, 2020, his nomination was sent to the Senate. President Trump nominated Hardy to the seat being vacated by Judge Margaret A. Ryan, whose term subsequently expired on July 31, 2020. On August 4, 2020, he received a hearing before the Senate Armed Services Committee. On September 15, 2020, his nomination was reported out of committee by a voice vote. On December 3, 2020, the United States Senate invoked cloture on his nomination by a 61–34 vote. His nomination was confirmed later that day by a 59–34 vote. He was sworn in on December 8, 2020.

== See also ==
- List of law clerks for the tenth seat of the Supreme Court of the United States

Legal offices
Preceded by Margaret A. Ryan	Judge of the United States Court of Appeals for the Armed Forces; 2020–present	Incumbent
