= Janet Cooper Alexander =

American law professor

- Born: 1946 (age 79–80)

Academic background
- Education: Swarthmore College (BA); Stanford University (MA); University of California, Berkeley (JD)

Academic work
- Discipline: Constitutional law, contract law, class actions
- Institutions: Stanford Law School

Janet Cooper Alexander is an American lawyer and law professor who is currently the Frederick I. Richman Professor of Law Emerita at Stanford Law School.

== Career ==
Alexander graduated with a Bachelor of Arts in English literature with distinction from Swarthmore College in 1968. In 1973, she received a Master of Arts in English from Stanford University, and a Juris Doctor from the University California, Berkeley Law School in 1978. She then served as a law clerk to Judge Shirley M. Hufstedler of the United States Court of Appeals for the Ninth Circuit from 1978 to 1979, and to Justice Thurgood Marshall of the United States Supreme Court from 1979 to 1980.

Following her clerkships, she practiced law at Califano, Ross & Heineman in Washington, D.C. from 1980 to 1982, and then for five years at Morrison & Foerster in San Francisco, California, where she was a partner, 1984–1987.

In 1987, Alexander accepted a position as associate professor at Stanford Law School. She became a professor in 1994, and since 2002 has held the Frederick I. Richman chair.

== See also ==
- List of law clerks for the tenth seat of the Supreme Court of the United States

== Selected publications ==
- Alexander, Janet Cooper (2013). "The Law-Free Zone and Back Again" (PDF). Illinois Law Review. 2013: 551–624.
