= Milton Pollack =

American judge

Senior Judge of the United States District Court for the Southern District of New York
- In office September 29, 1983 – August 13, 2004

Judge of the United States District Court for the Southern District of New York
- In office June 12, 1967 – September 29, 1983
- Appointed by: Lyndon B. Johnson
- Preceded by: Wilfred Feinberg
- Succeeded by: Peter K. Leisure

Personal details
- Born: Milton Pollack; September 29, 1906 New York City, New York, U.S.
- Died: August 13, 2004 (aged 97) New York City, New York, U.S.
- Education: Columbia University (BA, JD)

Milton Pollack (September 29, 1906 – August 13, 2004) was a United States district judge of the United States District Court for the Southern District of New York.

== Education and career ==
Born in New York City, New York, Pollack received a Bachelor of Arts degree from Columbia University in 1927. He received a Juris Doctor from Columbia Law School in 1929. He was in private practice of law in New York City from 1929 to 1967.

== Federal judicial service ==
Pollack was nominated by President Lyndon B. Johnson on May 24, 1967, to a seat on the United States District Court for the Southern District of New York vacated by Judge Wilfred Feinberg. He was confirmed by the United States Senate on June 12, 1967, and received his commission the same day. He assumed senior status on September 29, 1983. His service was terminated on August 13, 2004, due to his death in New York City.

== See also ==
- List of Jewish American jurists

== Sources ==
- Biography of Milton Pollack in the Federal Judicial Directory.
- Damien Cave, "Milton Pollack, Noted Federal Judge, Dies at 97", New York Times, August 16, 2004.

Legal offices
Preceded by Wilfred Feinberg	Judge of the United States District Court for the Southern District of New York; 1967–1983	Succeeded by Peter K. Leisure
