= Wilfred Feinberg =

American judge (1920–2014)

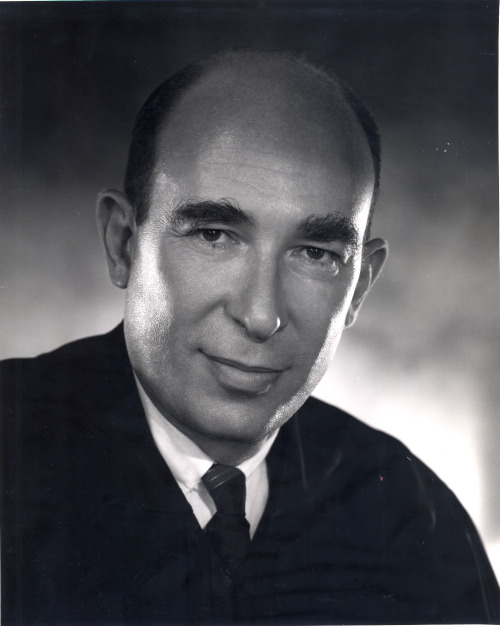

Senior Judge of the United States Court of Appeals for the Second Circuit
- In office January 31, 1991 – July 31, 2014

Chief Judge of the United States Court of Appeals for the Second Circuit
- In office 1980–1988
- Preceded by: Irving Kaufman
- Succeeded by: James L. Oakes

Judge of the United States Court of Appeals for the Second Circuit
- In office March 7, 1966 – January 31, 1991
- Appointed by: Lyndon B. Johnson
- Preceded by: Thurgood Marshall
- Succeeded by: Dennis Jacobs

Judge of the United States District Court for the Southern District of New York
- In office October 5, 1961 – March 7, 1966
- Appointed by: John F. Kennedy
- Preceded by: Seat established by 75 Stat. 80
- Succeeded by: Milton Pollack

Personal details
- Born: Wilfred Feinberg; June 22, 1920 New York City, New York, U.S.
- Died: July 31, 2014 (aged 94) New York City, New York, U.S.
- Education: Columbia University (BA, LLB)

Wilfred Feinberg (June 22, 1920 – July 31, 2014) was a United States circuit judge of the United States Court of Appeals for the Second Circuit and previously was a United States District Judge of the United States District Court for the Southern District of New York.

== Early life and career ==
Born on June 22, 1920, in New York City and of Jewish descent, Feinberg received a Bachelor of Arts degree in 1940 from Columbia University and received a Bachelor of Laws in 1946 from Columbia Law School, where he was editor-in-chief of the Columbia Law Review. He was in the United States Army from 1942 to 1945. He was a law clerk for Judge James P. McGranery of the United States District Court for the Eastern District of Pennsylvania from 1947 to 1949. He was in private practice in New York City from 1949 to 1961. He was deputy superintendent of the New York State Department of Banks in 1958.

== Federal Judicial Service ==
Feinberg received a recess appointment from President John F. Kennedy on October 5, 1961, to the United States District Court for the Southern District of New York, to a new seat authorized by 75 Stat. 80. He was nominated to the same position by President Kennedy on January 15, 1962. He was confirmed by the United States Senate on March 16, 1962, and received his commission on March 17, 1962. His service terminated on March 7, 1966, due to elevation to the Second Circuit.

Feinberg was nominated by President Lyndon B. Johnson on January 19, 1966, to a seat on the United States Court of Appeals for the Second Circuit vacated by Judge Thurgood Marshall. He was confirmed by the Senate on March 4, 1966, and received his commission on March 7, 1966. He served as Chief Judge from 1980 to 1988. He was a member of the Judicial Conference of the United States from 1980 to 1988. He assumed senior status on January 31, 1991. He took inactive senior status in 2011. His service terminated on July 31, 2014, due to his death in New York City.

=== Notable opinions ===
Feinberg authored many seminal opinions, including United States v. Miller, which upheld the constitutionality of a federal law prohibiting the burning of draft cards, NLRB v. J.P. Stevens & Co, the labor union case that inspired the movie, Norma Rae, and Kelly v. Wyman.

== Honors ==
In 2004 Feinberg received the 22nd Annual Edward J. Devitt Distinguished Service to Justice Award, which honors an Article III judge whose career has been exemplary, as measured by the significant contributions to the administration of justice, the advancement of the rule of law, and the improvement of society as a whole. He has also been awarded the Learned Hand Medal for Excellence in Federal Jurisprudence and the Edward Weinfeld Award. In the pages of the Columbia Law Review, Professor Maurice Rosenberg summarized Feinberg's career, writing "Wilfred Feinberg is the kind of jurist the Founding Fathers must have had in mind when they bestowed life tenure on federal judges. His first twenty-five years on the bench have revealed qualities of mind and conscience that are of the kind most sought after in a judge. Feinberg regards judicial office as a way to serve justice, not as a chance to wield power. And he renders his service superbly -- with intelligence, understanding, kindness, and craftsmanship. He is animated by a disciplined compassion that flows from a humane mind committed to the law".

== Former clerks ==
Feinberg's former clerks include many law professors, including Lee Bollinger (President of Columbia University), Thomas Joo (UC Davis School of Law), Rachel Moran (Dean of UCLA School of Law), Richard Revesz (Dean of New York University Law School and Director of the American Law Institute), David Wippman (Dean of the University of Minnesota Law School), and David Wilkins (Professor at Harvard Law School); judges, including Judge Gerard E. Lynch, United States Circuit Judge for the Second Circuit (and Professor of Law at Columbia), and Judge Michael Dolinger, United States Magistrate Judge for the Southern District of New York, public servants such as Francis Blake, former general counsel of the United States Environmental Protection Agency, and prominent public interest lawyers, including Ralph Cavanagh of the Natural Resources Defense Council in San Francisco and Penda Hair of Advancement Project in Washington, D.C. Feinberg's papers are housed at the Columbia University Rare Book & Manuscript Library.

== Notable cases ==
- Zippo Mfg. Co. v. Rogers Imports, Inc., 216 F.Supp. 670 (S.D.N.Y. 1963)
- American Exp. Warehousing, Limited v. Transamerica Ins. Co., 380 F.2d 277 (C.A.2 (N.Y.) 1967)
- Kelly v. Wyman, 294 F.Supp. 893 (S.D.N.Y. 1968)
- J. P. Stevens & Co. v. N. L. R. B., 380 F.2d 292 (2d Cir. 1967)
- N.L.R.B. v. J.P. Stevens & Co., Inc., 563 F.2d 8(2d Cir. 1977)
- U.S. v. Bethlehem Steel Corp., 446 F.2d 652 (2d Cir. 1971)
- Goetz v. Ansell, 477 F.2d 636 (2d Cir. 1973)
- Matter of Andros Compania Maritima, S.A. of Kissavos (Marc Rich & Co., A.G.), 579 F.2d 691 (2d Cir. 1978)
- Filártiga v. Peña-Irala, 630 F.2d 876 (2d Cir. 1980)
- Independent Bankers Ass'n of New York State, Inc. v. Marine Midland Bank, N.A., 757 F.2d 453 (2d Cir. 1985)
- Knight v. U.S. Fire Ins. Co., 804 F.2d 9 (2d Cir. 1986)
- Kaplan v. City of Burlington, 891 F.2d 1024 (2d Cir. 1989)
- New Era Publications Intern., 904 F.2d 152 (2d Cir. 1990)
- In re Joint Eastern and Southern Dist. Asbestos Litigation, 982 F.2d 721 (2d Cir. 1992)
  - In re Joint Eastern and Southern Dist. Asbestos Litigation, 993 F.2d 7 (2d Cir. 1993)
- Bellamy v. Cogdell, 974 F.2d 302 (2d Cir. 1992)
- Atlantic States Legal Foundation, Inc. v. Pan American Tanning Corp., 993 F.2d 1017 (2d Cir. 1993)
- In re U.S., 10 F.3d 931 (2d Cir. 1993)
- Woods v. Bourne Co., 60 F.3d 978 (2d Cir. 1995)
- Hadges v. Yonkers Racing Corp., 48 F.3d 1320 (2d Cir. 1995)
- Baker v. Cuomo, 58 F.3d 814 (2d Cir. 1995)
- Baker v. Pataki, 85 F.3d 919 (2d Cir. 1996)

== Published works ==
- Federal Judicial Center Judicial Writing Project (Board of Editors), 1989–Present
- Expediting Review of Felony Convictions, 59 American Bar Association Journal 1025 (1973)
- Foreword: A National Court of Appeals?, 42 Brooklyn Law Review 611 (1976)
- Foreword: Judicial Administration: Stepchild of the Law, 52 St. Johns Law Review 187 (1978)
- Maritime Arbitration and the Federal Courts, 5 Fordham International Law Journal 245 (1982)
- The National Court of Appeals: Is It Necessary?, 32 The Record, Association of the Bar of the City of New York 106 (1977)
- The State of the Second Circuit, 38 The Record, Association of the Bar of the City of New York 363, May/June, 1983
- Introduction, The Law and the Public, A. Bartlett Giamatti, 38 The Record, Association of the Bar of the City of New York, Jan./Feb., 1983
- Second Circuit Court, A Far Cry From Days of Learned Hand (Transcript), 187 New York Law Journal 1 (1982)
- Tribute: Hon. James D. Hopkins, 3 Pace Law Review 451 (1983)
- Introduction: The Remarkable Hands – An Affectionate Portrait, Published by Federal Bar Association (1983)
- Address Before the New York Patent Law Association (Transcript), 65 Journal Pat. Off. Society 221 (1983)
- Constraining "The Least Dangerous Branch" The Tradition of Attacks on Judicial Power (Madison Lecture), 50 New York University Law Review (May 1984)
- Constraining The Least Dangerous Branch The Tradition of Attacks on Judicial Power (Madison Lecture), The Evolving Constitution, 208 Wesleyan University Press (1989)
- The State of the Second Circuit (Transcript), 39 American Bar Central New York 178 (1984)
- The Office of Chief Judge of a Federal Court of Appeals (Sonnet Lecture), 53 Fordham Law Review 369 (1985)
- Judicial Independence, 36 Syracuse Law Review 885 (1985)
- The State of the Second Circuit (Transcript), 106 F.R.D. 121 (1985)
- Unique Customs and Practices of the Second Circuit (Inaugural Kaplan Lecture) 14 Hofstra Law Review 297 (1986)
- In Memoriam: Henry J. Friendly, 99 Harvard Law Review 1713 (1986)
- The Coming Deterioration of the Federal Judiciary, 42 The Record 179 (1987)
- Is Diversity Jurisdiction an Idea Whose Time Has Passed?, New York State Bar Journal, July, 1989
- Foreword, Distinctive Practices of The Second Circuit, Foundation of the Federal Bar Council, 1989
- Senior Judges: A National Resource, 56 Brooklyn Law Review 409 (1990)
- Arbitration and Antitrust: An Introduction, 44 New York University Law Review 1069 (1969)
- Recent Developments in the Law of Privacy, 48 Columbus Law Review 713 (1948)
- The Role of the Judge, The Grand Design of America's Justice System, 30 Series, Institute of Comparative Law 81, Chūō University, Japan, 1995
- Introduction, Dialogue Between Hon. Frank A. Easterbrook and Hon. John J. Gibbons on Approaches to Judicial Review, The Blessings of Liberty, An Enduring Constitution in a Changing World, Random House, 1989
- A View From the Bench, Experience, The Magazine of the Senior Lawyers Division (ABA) Vol. 7, #1, p. 22, Fall, 1996

== See also ==
- List of Jewish American jurists
- List of United States federal judges by longevity of service

Legal offices
Preceded by Seat established by 75 Stat. 80	Judge of the United States District Court for the Southern District of New York; 1961–1966	Succeeded by Milton Pollack
Preceded by Thurgood Marshall	Judge of the United States Court of Appeals for the Second Circuit; 1966–1991	Succeeded by Dennis Jacobs
Preceded by Irving Kaufman	Chief Judge of the United States Court of Appeals for the Second Circuit; 1980–1988	Succeeded by James L. Oakes
