= Steven Menashi =

American federal judge (born 1979)

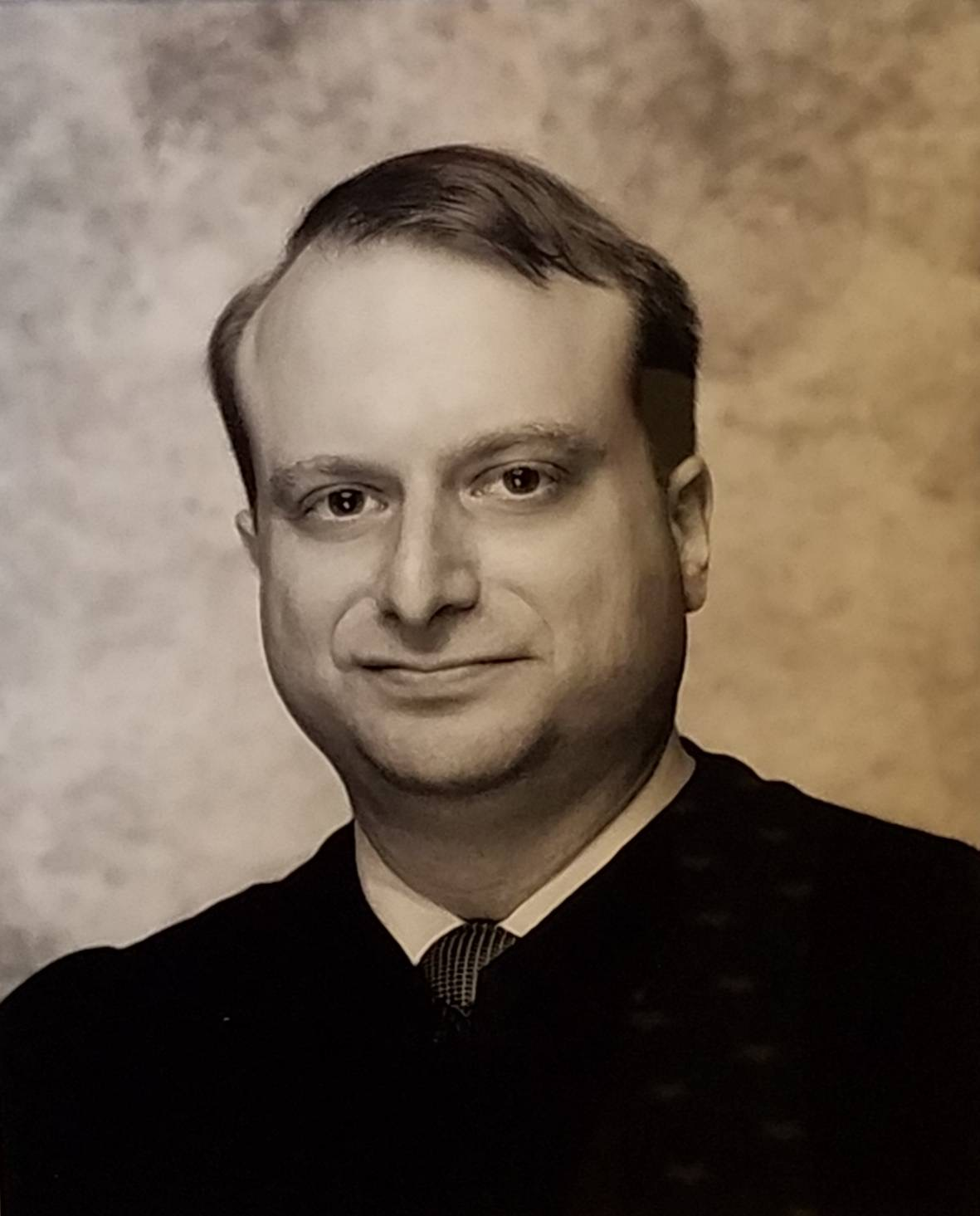
- Menashi c. 2021

Judge of the United States Court of Appeals for the Second Circuit
- Incumbent
- Assumed office November 14, 2019
- Appointed by: Donald Trump
- Preceded by: Dennis Jacobs

General Counsel of the United States Department of Education
- Acting
- In office May 24, 2017 – April 23, 2018
- President: Donald Trump
- Preceded by: James Cole Jr.
- Succeeded by: Carlos G. Muñiz

Personal details
- Born: Steven James Menashi; 1979 (age 46–47) White Plains, New York, U.S.
- Education: Dartmouth College (BA); Stanford University (JD)

Steven James Menashi (born October 4, 1979) is an American lawyer and jurist serving as a United States circuit judge of the United States Court of Appeals for the Second Circuit since 2019. After completing his legal studies, Menashi served as a law clerk to Judge Douglas Ginsburg of the DC Circuit Court of Appeals, and later to Justice Samuel Alito of the United States Supreme Court. Prior to his appointment, Menashi was a partner at Kirkland & Ellis, a law professor at the Antonin Scalia Law School of George Mason University, and General Counsel to the United States Department of Education.

== Early life and education ==
Menashi was born in 1979, in White Plains, New York. Menashi's grandparents were Jewish immigrants from Iraq and Ukraine; his maternal grandfather's relatives were murdered in the Holocaust.

Menashi graduated from Dartmouth College in 2001 with a Bachelor of Arts, magna cum laude. He worked at the Hoover Institution from 2001 to 2004, and concurrently studied at the Johns Hopkins University School of Advanced International Studies. From 2004 to 2005 he was an editorial writer for The New York Sun. He then attended Stanford Law School, where he was an editor of the Stanford Law Review. He graduated in 2008 with a Juris Doctor and was inducted into the Order of the Coif.

== Legal career ==
Menashi served as a law clerk to Judge Douglas H. Ginsburg of the United States Court of Appeals for the District of Columbia Circuit from 2008 to 2009. From 2009 to 2010, he was at Georgetown University Law Center as an Olin-Searle Fellow, a program offered by the Federalist Society. He then clerked for Justice Samuel Alito of the United States Supreme Court from 2010 to 2011.

From 2011 to 2016, Menashi worked in the New York City office of the law firm Kirkland & Ellis, where he became a partner. While at Kirkland & Ellis, Menashi was a Research Fellow at the New York University School of Law and the Opperman Institute for Judicial Administration for three years, from 2013 to 2016.

From 2016 to 2017, Menashi was an assistant professor of law at George Mason University's Antonin Scalia Law School, where he focused on administrative law and civil procedure.

=== Trump administration ===
In 2017, Menashi took a leave of absence from George Mason to become the Deputy General Counsel for Postsecondary Service at the United States Department of Education and served as General Counsel on an acting basis for that department as of May 24. At the Department of Education, Menashi helped devise a plan by the Department of Education to deny debt relief for thousands of students who were cheated by for-profit colleges. The plan, which used students' private Social Security data, was ruled illegal by a federal judge. The Department argued that the plan only involved the use of "aggregate, statistical data without any personal identifiers". His role as acting general counsel ended on April 23, 2018, after Carlos G. Muñiz was confirmed to that position by the U.S. Senate.

In September 2018, Menashi moved to the White House to become a Special Assistant to the President and Associate Counsel to the President. While in the Office of the White House Counsel, Menashi reportedly worked with Senior Advisor Stephen Miller on several immigration policy issues, including Trump's remain in Mexico policy and revised interpretations of the public charge rule.

== Federal judicial service ==
=== Appointment ===
On August 14, 2019, President Donald Trump announced his intent to nominate Menashi to serve as a United States Circuit Judge of the United States Court of Appeals for the Second Circuit. On September 9, 2019, his nomination was sent to the Senate. That same day, the American Bar Association rated Menashi as "well qualified," its highest rating.

On September 11, 2019, a heated hearing on Menashi's nomination was held before the Senate Judiciary Committee. During his hearing, Menashi was criticized by senators from both parties for refusing to answer their questions regarding the legal advice he gave on the Trump administration's immigration policies. He was also questioned about an article he had written in the University of Pennsylvania Journal of International Law on ethnonationalism and Israel, in which he argued that Israel's Jewish identity was consistent with its status as a liberal democracy.

On November 7, 2019, his nomination was reported out of committee by a 12–10 vote. On November 13, 2019, the United States Senate invoked cloture by a 51–44 vote. On November 14, 2019, his nomination was confirmed by a 51–41 vote. He received his judicial commission on the same day. He filled the seat vacated by Dennis Jacobs, who assumed senior status on May 31, 2019.

=== Notable opinions ===
In Henry v. County of Nassau (2d Cir. 2021), Menashi ruled that a prohibition on firearms ownership based on an ex parte order of protection violates the Second Amendment.

In United States v. Donzinger (2d Cir. 2022), Menashi dissented when the Second Circuit upheld the corporate prosecution of environmental lawyer Steven Donziger. Menashi wrote that the prosecution, which had been initiated by a judge, violated the separation of powers put forth by the United States Constitution. The Supreme Court denied review of the case, but Justice Neil Gorsuch suggested that courts considering the appointment of their own prosecutors should "consider carefully Judge Menashi's dissenting opinion in this case."

In Fuld v. Palestine Liberation Organization and Waldman v. Palestine Liberation Organization (2d Cir. 2024), Menashi dissented from the Second Circuit's denial of en banc review in a decision in which it had concluded that it did not have personal jurisdiction over the Palestine Liberation Organization or the Palestinian Authority in suits concerning deaths and injuries to United States citizens from terrorist attacks overseas. The U.S. Supreme Court later granted certiorari to review the case and reversed the Second Circuit in a 9-0 decision holding the Palestine Liberation Organization and Palestinian Authority were properly subject to personal jurisdiction. See Fuld v. Palestine Liberation Organization, 606 U.S. ___, No. 24-20 (June 20, 2025). Both the Court’s opinion and Justice Thomas’ concurrence cited Judge Menashi’s dissenting opinion from the Second Circuit.

In Brinkmann v. Town of Southold (2d Cir. 2024), Menashi dissented to argue that the town of Southold, New York had violated the takings clause of the Fifth Amendment by using eminent domain to stop the property owners from building a hardware store on the land.

In United States v. Benjamin (2d Cir. 2024), Menashi wrote an opinion reinstating bribery and fraud charges against former Lieutenant Governor of New York Brian Benjamin. The government had alleged that Benjamin promised to allocate $50,000 in state funds to a non-profit organization controlled by a real estate developer in exchange for campaign contributions from the developer. Menashi opined that the indictment alleged an explicit quid pro quo.

Menashi authored the majority opinion in United States v. Alisigwe (2d Cir. 2026) in which the court held that searches of a cellphone at an international border cannot be "unreasonable" within the meaning of the Fourth Amendment, even if the government lacks suspicion of a crime, because of the "longstanding" right of the sovereign to search property crossing the border. Menashi opined that searches of property crossing the border "are reasonable simply by virtue of the fact that they occur at the border."

==== Donald Trump ====
Menashi has ruled in favor of Donald Trump in several cases.

- In CREW v. Trump (2d Cir. 2020), Menashi dissented when the en banc Second Circuit allowed an emoluments clause lawsuit to proceed against Trump, arguing that the plaintiffs lacked standing to bring their suit.
- In Behar v. DHS (2d Cir. 2022), Menashi upheld the Secret Service's decision not to release information about persons who met with then-candidate and President-elect Trump under the Freedom of Information Act.

==== First Amendment ====
Menashi has taken a broad view of First Amendment protections.

- In A.H. v. French (2d Cir. 2021), Menashi authored a decision that prevented Vermont from barring Christian school students from a statewide tuition program.
- In Kravitz v. Purcell (2d Cir. 2023), Menashi ruled in favor of a Jewish prisoner's religious liberty claim when prison officials prevented the inmate from observing a Jewish holiday. Menashi's opinion concluded that "a prisoner claiming a violation of the right to the free exercise of religion under Section 1983 need not make a showing of a substantial burden."
- In Slattery v. Hochul (2d Cir. 2023), Menashi wrote an opinion prohibiting the state of New York from enforcing a state labor law that would have required a pro-life "crisis pregnancy center" to hire employees who had previously had abortions. Menashi held that this violated the center's First Amendment right to freedom of expressive association.

==== Immigration ====
Menashi has issued several consequential immigration law opinions.

- In Hassoun v. Searls (2d Cir. 2020), Menashi allowed the government to hold a Palestinian man in indefinite immigration detention after he completed a prison sentence for providing material support for terrorism under a "special circumstance" exception.
- In United States v. Perez (2d Cir. 2021), Menashi wrote separately to argue that illegal immigrants do not possess Second Amendment rights because they are not citizens.
- In Bhaktibhai-Patel v. Garland (2d Cir. 2022), Menashi ruled that the district court did not have jurisdiction to review an immigration judge's order that denied an immigrant's request for withholding of removal when that immigrant illegally re-entered the U.S. after having been removed previously.
- In Ojo v. Garland (2d Cir. 2022), Menashi dissented from the court's decision to vacate the denial of asylum for a Nigerian citizen convicted of wire fraud and identity theft charges. Menashi would have upheld the denial of asylum.

==== Title IX ====
Menashi has issued a number of opinions interpreting Title IX of the Civil Rights Act of 1964.

- In Schiebel v. Schoharie Central School District (2d Cir. 2024), Menashi wrote the majority opinion ruling that a school can be liable for discrimination under Title IX by being deliberately indifferent to the truth or falsity of a sexual misconduct allegation against a male student.
- In Soule v. Connecticut Assoc. of Schools, (2d Cir. 2023) (en banc), Menashi wrote separately to argue that a state athletic association could have been on notice that its policy, which allowed transgender athletes to participate in women's sports, violated Title IX.

== Publications ==
- Menashi, Steven (2009). "Article III as a Constitutional Compromise: Modern Textualism and State Sovereign Immunity". Notre Dame Law Review. 84: 1135.
- Menashi, Steven (2010). "Ethnonationalism and Liberal Democracy". University of Pennsylvania Journal of International Law. 32: 57. Archived from the original on October 7, 2014.
- Ginsburg, Douglas; Menashi, Steven (2010). "Nondelegation and the Unitary Executive". University of Pennsylvania Journal of Constitutional Law. 12: 251. Archived from the original on October 7, 2014.
- Ginsburg, Douglas; Menashi, Steven (2014). "Rational Basis with Economic Bite". New York University Journal of Law & Liberty. 8: 1055.
- Ginsburg, Douglas; Menashi, Steven (2016). "Our Illiberal Administrative Law". New York University Journal of Law & Liberty. 10: 475.
- Estreicher, Samuel; Menashi, Steven (2017). "Taking Steel Seizure Seriously: The Iran Nuclear Agreement and the Separation of Powers". Fordham Law Review. 86: 1199.
- Menashi, Steven (2023). "The Prudent Judge". Harvard Journal of Law & Public Policy: Per Curiam. (symposium on the jurisprudence of Justice Samuel Alito).
- Menashi, Steven J.; Epstein, Daniel Z. (2024). "Congressional Incentives and the Administrative State". New York University Journal of Law & Liberty. 17: 172.

== See also ==
- Donald Trump judicial appointment controversies
- Donald Trump Supreme Court candidates
- List of Jewish American jurists
- List of law clerks for the eighth seat of the Supreme Court of the United States

Legal offices
Preceded by Dennis Jacobs	Judge of the United States Court of Appeals for the Second Circuit; 2019–present	Incumbent
