= Vicki C. Jackson =

American legal scholar

Vicki C. Jackson is the Laurence H. Tribe Professor of Constitutional Law at Harvard Law School. The New York Times has described her as "an authority on state-federal questions".

== Biography ==
Jackson received her BA, summa cum laude, from Yale University in 1972. She earned her JD from Yale Law School in 1975, where she was an editor of the Yale Law Journal. She was a clerk for Thurgood Marshall of the United States Supreme Court. Jackson was an associate and then partner at the firm of Rogovin, Huge & Lenzner in Washington, D.C. She served as a Deputy Assistant Attorney General in the Office of Legal Counsel at the US Department of Justice. She taught and held several administrative positions at Georgetown University Law Center from 1985 to 2011.

On December 11, 2012, the United States Supreme Court appointed Jackson as amicus curiae in United States v. Windsor to argue an unrepresented position relating to the legal standing of two of the parties.

Her publications include the book Constitutional Engagement in a Transnational Era.

== See also ==
- List of law clerks for the tenth seat of the Supreme Court of the United States
