= Kate Todd (lawyer) =

American lawyer and presidential counsel

Kate Comerford Todd
- Education: Cornell University (B.A.); Harvard Law School (J.D.)
- Occupations: Lawyer; presidential counsel
- Employer: Torridon Law PLLC
- Known for: Deputy Counsel to President Donald Trump; Inclusion on President Trump's 2020 Supreme Court list; Former law clerk to Justice Clarence Thomas
- Website: www.torridonlaw.com/our-team/kate-todd

Kate Comerford Todd is an American lawyer who is a partner at Torridon Law PLLC. She served as Deputy Assistant to the President and Deputy Counsel to President Donald Trump, advising the president on judicial selection. In 2020, Trump included Todd on his list of prospective nominees to the Supreme Court of the United States, and she was later reported as a contender for the vacancy created by the death of Justice Ruth Bader Ginsburg. Earlier in her career, Todd served as Associate Counsel to President George W. Bush, senior vice president and chief counsel of the U.S. Chamber Litigation Center.

== Education and clerkships ==
Todd graduated from Cornell University in 1996. She earned a J.D. magna cum laude from Harvard Law School, where she served as executive editor of the Harvard Law Review.

After law school, Todd clerked for Judge J. Michael Luttig of the United States Court of Appeals for the Fourth Circuit and for Associate Justice Clarence Thomas of the Supreme Court of the United States.

== Legal career ==
Todd was a partner at Wiley, Rein & Fielding in Washington, D.C., where she worked in the firm's appellate, litigation, and communications practices. In 2007, President George W. Bush named Todd Associate Counsel to the President.

Todd later served as senior vice president and chief counsel of the U.S. Chamber Litigation Center, the litigation arm of the U.S. Chamber of Commerce. In that role, according to her Federalist Society biography, she developed litigation strategies in state and federal courts and worked on matters involving the Supreme Court.

In 2021, Todd joined Browne George Ross as managing partner of its new Washington, D.C. office; the firm stated that it would later be known as Ellis George Cipollone. In 2024, she joined Torridon Law as a partner as part of a group that included former White House Counsel Pat Cipollone and former Deputy White House Counsel Pat Philbin.

== Trump administration and Supreme Court shortlist ==
On February 2, 2019, the White House announced that Todd would serve as Deputy Assistant to the President and Deputy Counsel to the President. In that role, she advised President Trump on judicial selection.

On September 9, 2020, Trump announced 20 additions to his list of prospective Supreme Court nominees and stated that any further Supreme Court nominee during his presidency would come from the names he had publicly shared. SCOTUSblog listed Todd, then deputy White House counsel, among the 20 additions.

After Justice Ruth Bader Ginsburg died later that month, the Associated Press described Todd as one of the contenders on Trump's short list to replace Ginsburg. The AP reported that Todd was the only lawyer mentioned on Trump's shortlist who had not previously served as a judge, while noting her Supreme Court clerkship for Justice Thomas and her prior service in both the Bush and Trump White House Counsel's Offices. Trump ultimately nominated Amy Coney Barrett to the seat.

== Teaching and public service ==
Todd taught federal courts at George Washington University Law School and constitutional law in Cornell University's Washington program. In 2020, The Cornell Daily Sun reported that Cornell had confirmed Todd taught in the Cornell in Washington program in spring 2003, spring 2004, spring 2005, and fall 2005.

Todd serves as a public member of the Administrative Conference of the United States and as a member of the board of visitors of the Virginia Military Institute. She also serves on the board of directors of the Catholic Information Center in Washington, D.C.
