= Elbert Lin =

American lawyer

1st Solicitor General of West Virginia
- In office January 14, 2013 – September 1, 2017
- Appointed by: Patrick Morrisey
- Preceded by: Office established
- Succeeded by: Lindsay See

Personal details
- Born: New York City, New York, U.S.
- Spouse: Laurie Barber
- Education: Yale University (BA, JD)

Elbert Lin is an American lawyer who served as the first Solicitor General of West Virginia from 2013 to 2017. He is currently a partner and chair of the Issues and Appeals practice group at Hunton Andrews Kurth as well as a member of the Administrative Conference of the United States.

== Early life and education ==
Lin was born in New York City to Taiwanese immigrant parents. He grew up in the suburbs of Chicago. He graduated from Yale University with a Bachelor of Arts, magna cum laude, in engineering in 1999. He then earned his Juris Doctor from Yale Law School in 2003. As a law student at Yale, he was the managing editor of The Yale Law Journal.

== Career ==
After graduating from law school, he clerked for Senior Judge Robert Keeton of the U.S. District Court for the District of Massachusetts before becoming a trial attorney in the Federal Programs Branch of the U.S. Department of Justice's Civil Division during the presidency of George W. Bush. He left the department to clerk for Judge William H. Pryor Jr. of the U.S. Court of Appeals for the Eleventh Circuit and worked at Wiley Rein in Washington, D.C. from 2007 to 2013, excepting a year-long leave of absence he took to clerk for U.S. Supreme Court Justice Clarence Thomas during the Court's 2010 term.

In 2013, he was appointed by Patrick Morrisey, the newly elected Attorney General of West Virginia to serve as West Virginia's first solicitor general. The state's appeals were previously handled by the Criminal Appellate Division of the Office of the Attorney General, now under the purview of the Solicitor General. In the early stages of the case West Virginia v. EPA, he was the lead counsel for the petitioners, and he succeeded in convincing the U.S. Supreme Court to grant a stay on enforcement of the Obama administration's Clean Power Plan. Lin joined Hunton & Williams (now Hunton Andrews Kurth) in 2017. He was appointed as a Public Member of the Administrative Conference of the United States in 2020.
