= Rachel Moran =

American lawyer and academic

- Born: 1956 (age 69–70); Kansas City, Missouri, U.S.
- Education: Stanford University (BA); Yale University (JD)
- Occupations: Author; professor; lawyer
- Years active: 1981–present

Rachel F. Moran (born 1956) is an American lawyer who is currently a distinguished professor at UC Irvine School of Law. She was previously the Michael J. Connell Distinguished Professor of Law at UCLA School of Law. She served as Dean of the UCLA School of Law from 2010 to 2015, and was a faculty member at UC Irvine School of Law from 2008 to 2010, and at UC Berkeley School of Law from 1983 to 2008.

== Biography ==
Moran was born in Kansas City, Missouri, and grew up in Yuma, Arizona. Her father, Thomas Moran, was an Irish criminal defense attorney, and her mother, Josephine Moran, was a Mexican teacher and court interpreter.

She attended Stanford University, earning a Bachelor's in psychology in 1978. She then earned a J.D. from Yale Law School in 1981, and clerked for Chief Judge Wilfred Feinberg of the Second Circuit. Following a brief stint in private practice at Heller Ehrman White & McAuliffe, Moran joined the faculty at UC Berkeley School of Law (then "Boalt Hall") as its first Latina law professor, and taught there for 25 years. After two years at UC Irvine School of Law as a founding faculty member, Moran was selected to become UCLA School of Law's eighth dean in 2010, and the first Latina dean of a top-ranked US law school.

Moran's scholarship has focused on torts, education law (particularly bilingual education), civil rights, race and the law, and critical race theory.

== Publications ==
- Educational Policy and the Law Mark Yudof, Betsy Levin, Rachel Moran, James M Ryan, Kristi L Bowman (2011)
- "Let Freedom Ring: Making Grutter Matter in School Desegregation Cases," 63 University of Miami Law Rev. 475 (2009)
- Race Law Stories (with Devon Carbado, Foundation Press, 2008)
- "Rethinking Race, Equality and Liberty: The Unfulfilled Promise of Parents Involved," 69 Ohio State University Law Review 1321 (2008)
- "Fear Unbound: A Reply to Professor Sunstein," in 42 Washburn Law Journal 1 (2003).
- Interracial Intimacy: The Regulation of Race and Romance (University of Chicago Press, 2001)
- "The Politics of Discretion: Federal Intervention in Bilingual Education", 76 California Law Review 6 (Dec. 1988), pp. 1249–1352
- "Bilingual Education as a Status Conflict", 75 California Law Review 321 (1987)

== Awards and honors ==
- 1995, UC Berkeley Distinguished Teaching Award
- 2009, President of the Association of American Law Schools (AALS)
- 2011, Appointment by President Obama to the Permanent Committee for the Oliver Wendell Holmes Devise (maintenance of official history of the US Supreme Court)
- 2011, Tomás Rivera Lecture, Keynote address at the American Association of Hispanics in Higher Education (AAHHE) Annual Conference
- 2012, Jerome Hall Lecture, Indiana University Maurer School of Law ("Clark Kerr and Me: The Future of the Public Law School", March 21, 2012)
