= Frank Sander =

American law professor (1927–2018)

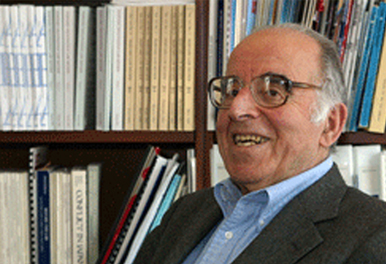

Frank E. A. Sander (July 22, 1927 – February 25, 2018) was an American professor emeritus and associate dean of Harvard Law School. He pioneered the field of alternative dispute resolution and is widely credited with being a father of the field in the United States as a result of his paper, The Varieties of Dispute Processing, presented at the Pound Conference in 1976 in Minneapolis, Minnesota. Sander's book, Dispute Resolution: Negotiation, Mediation, and Other Processes, which he coauthored with Stephen B. Goldberg, Nancy H. Rogers, and Sarah Rudolph Cole, is used in law schools throughout the United States.

== Early life ==
Sander was born on July 22, 1927, in Stuttgart, Germany. He moved to the United States in 1940, and attended Brookline High School in Brookline, Massachusetts, before matriculating at Harvard College in 1944. He graduated magna cum laude with an A.B. degree in mathematics in 1949, having served a year in the U.S. Army. He planned to work as a math professor but he was encouraged by his older sister to enroll at Harvard Law School, where he graduated magna cum laude with an L.L.B. degree in 1952. While a student, he was treasurer of the Harvard Law Review, president of the Pierian Sodality and a member of Phi Beta Kappa.

== Career ==
After graduating, Sander served as law clerk to Chief Judge Calvert Magruder of the United States Court of Appeals for the First Circuit (1952–53) and as law clerk to Justice Felix Frankfurter, U.S. Supreme Court (1953–54). Following this Sander was an attorney in the tax division of the Department of Justice in Washington, D.C. (1954–56) and was associated with the Boston firm of Hill and Barlow (1956–59). He joined the Harvard faculty in 1959.

Sander, an expert on taxation, family law, welfare law, and dispute settlement, became professor of law at Harvard Law School in 1962, Bussey Professor in 1981, and served as Associate Dean at Harvard Law School from 1987 to 2000. He became Bussey Professor Emeritus in June 2006.

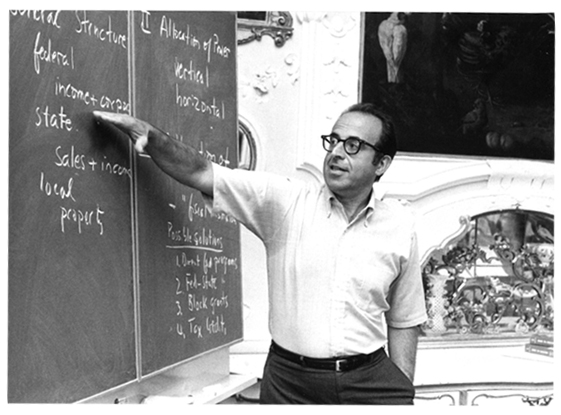
Frank E.A. Sander teaching at Harvard Law School

Sander is the co‑author of Cases and Materials on Family Law (3rd edition initially published by Little Brown in 1966), of Tax Aspects of Divorce and Separation (4th edition initially published by BNA in 1985), and of Readings in Federal Taxation (2nd edition initially published by Foundation Press in 1983). Sander has also written a number of articles in the taxation and family law fields, has lectured to numerous bar associations and served as consultant to the United States Treasury Department and the Ontario Law Reform Commission.

In 1966 Sander was the director of a special summer program at Harvard Law School which brought 40 African American college students to Cambridge for the purpose of interesting them in pursuing a legal career. From 1968 to 1970 Sander served as the chairman of the Council on Legal Education Opportunity, a national organization devoted to the recruitment and training of disadvantaged persons for the law.

From 1961 to 1963 Sander served as a member of the Committee on Civil and Political Rights of President Kennedy's Commission on the Status of Women. In 1970 Sander was appointed by Governor Sargent to the Massachusetts Commission on Adoption and Foster Care. In 1975, Sander was appointed by Governor Dukakis as chairman of the Massachusetts State Welfare Advisory Board. Sander also served as a trustee of the Buckingham, Browne & Nichols School in Cambridge from 1969 to 1975.

In 1975 Sander became active in the subject of alternative methods of dispute resolution (ADR). In 1976, at the invitation of the Chief Justice of the United States, Sander delivered a paper entitled "Varieties of Dispute Processing" at the Pound Conference which put forth the notion of the multidoor courthouse. This was the notion that disputes could be solved by a range of different approaches—adjudication through the courts, as well as mediation, arbitration, neighborhood justice centers among other approaches. This idea of having "the forum fit the fuss" caught on in a time when many courthouses were over-crowded and litigation had become quite expensive. ADR approaches are presently being utilized in Houston, Texas and Cambridge, Massachusetts as well as several other cities in the US and abroad.

Following the Pound Conference, the American Bar Association set up a special committee on dispute resolution (which later became the Standing Committee on Dispute Resolution and ultimately the Section on Dispute Resolution). Sander served as a member of this committee from its inception in 1976 until 1989, and served as its chairman from 1986 to 1989. For a number of years, Sander was chair of the editorial board of the Dispute Resolution Section's Dispute Resolution Magazine.

Sander taught several dispute resolution courses at Harvard Law School, including an introductory overview course, as well as more specialized courses in negotiation and mediation. He also taught a one‑week workshop on mediation for practicing lawyers under the auspices of the Harvard Law School's Program on Negotiation.

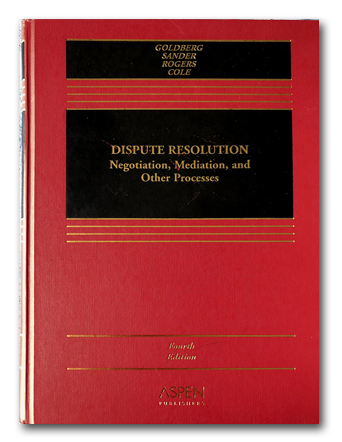
Frank E.A. Sander, Co-author of Dispute Resolution, Negotiation, Mediation and other Processes

In 1977 Frank Sander acted as a special consultant to the ABA to assist it in putting on the Conference on the Resolution of Minor Disputes, at Columbia Law School, and in 1979 he prepared together with Frederick Snyder, an extensive bibliography on dispute resolution that was published by the ABA. In 1980, Sander became chairman of the Council on the Role of Courts, a group of 26 scholars, lawyers and judges seeking to delineate the proper function of courts in the United States. Their report ‑- The Role of Courts in American Society -‑ was published in 1984. In 1990, Sander was appointed by the Chief Justice of the Supreme Judicial Court of Massachusetts to the Commission on the Future of the Courts, and served as co‑chair of the commission's Task Force on Alternative Paths to Justice. Until 2002, Sander served as vice‑chair of the Standing Committee on Dispute Resolution appointed by the Massachusetts Supreme Judicial Court as well as a member of the drafting committee of the Conference of Commissioners on Uniform State Law's project to develop a Uniform Mediation Act. In 1985 Sander, together with Professor Eric Green and Stephen Goldberg, authored a comprehensive book entitle Dispute Resolution published by Little Brown. The book won an award from the Center for Public Resources for outstanding book on dispute resolution published in that year and is widely used in law schools throughout the United States. The fifth edition, by Goldberg, Sander, Rogers and Cole, was published in 2007.

Sander helped to develop the ADR field not only through textbooks and publications, he also developed cutting edge courses and trained others to teach those. In 1982, Sander ran a workshop at Harvard Law School for law teachers interested in dispute settlement; the results of that workshop were published in the June 1984 Journal of Legal Education. Sander also helped to put on a major conference on "The Lawyer's Changing Role in Dispute Settlement." In 1991, he helped to put on a conference at Harvard Law School on "Emerging ADR Issues in State and Federal Courts", and edited a volume growing out of that conference that was subsequently published by the American Bar Association Section of Litigation. Sander also served for many years as Director of the Harvard Law School Program on Dispute Resolution.

Sander received many awards reflecting his leading role in developing the ADR field. In May 1988 Sander was awarded the Whitney North Seymour Medal by the American Arbitration Association for distinguished service to arbitration and other forms of dispute resolution. In 1989 the American Bar Association, with funds contributed by the National Institute for Dispute Resolution, established the Frank E.A. Sander Lecture Series on dispute resolution to make possible an annual presentation by a leading scholar or practitioner. In 1990, the Center for Public Resources gave Sander a special award "for distinguished contributions to the field of alternative dispute resolution." In 1993, the American Bar Association awarded Sander its Robert J. Kutak medal given annually to a person "who meets the highest standards of professional responsibility and demonstrates substantial achievement towards increased understanding between legal education and the active practice of law." And in 1999 Sander was awarded the D'Alemberte‑Raven medal for outstanding contributions to the field of dispute resolution. In 2006, he was awarded the Lifelong Achievement Award by the International Academy of Mediators.

In June 1982 Sander served as faculty chairman to present the first session on dispute resolution at the Salzburg Seminar in Austria. In the summer of 1989 he was invited by the Law Council of Australia to give a talk on US dispute resolution at the 26th Australian Legal Convention in Sydney. And in May 1990 Sander was invited to be a resident scholar at the Rockefeller Study Center In Bellagio, Italy. Sander has also lectured in Germany, South Africa, and Japan, and given one‑week workshops on mediation in Sydney, Australia, Auckland, New Zealand, Toronto and Vancouver, Canada, and Norway.

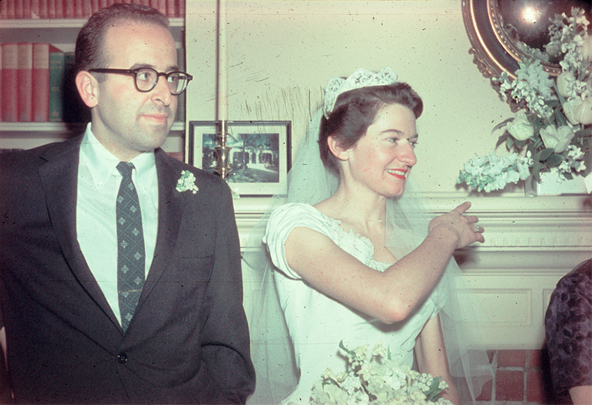
Frank and Emily on their wedding day, 1958

Sander served as a labor arbitrator for over 45 years and is on the roster of the American Arbitration Association, the Federal Mediation and Conciliation Service, and the Massachusetts State Board of Conciliation and Arbitration, as well as being a contractually designated arbitrator for General Electric and the International Union of Electrical Workers. Frank Sander mediated a variety of cases and is one of the court‑approved mediators in the Suffolk (Boston) Superior Court Mediation Program, and in the Middlesex (Cambridge) Multidoor Courthouse Project. In addition, he has served as a grievance mediator for AT&T and the Communications Workers of America, and as a mediator of franchise disputes for the CPR Institute of Dispute Resolution.

He was a member of the American, Massachusetts and Boston Bar Associations, and lived in Concord, Massachusetts.

== Personal life ==
Frank Sander married Emily Jones Sander on April 22, 1958, and has three children, Alison Sander, Tom Sander and Ernest Sander. Sander died on February 25, 2018, at the age of 90. He was a pioneer in the law field.

== See also ==
- List of law clerks for the second seat of the Supreme Court of the United States
