= Yale Kamisar =

American legal scholar and writer (1929–2022)

- Born: August 29, 1929; New York City, U.S.
- Died: January 30, 2022 (aged 92); Ann Arbor, Michigan, U.S.
- Education: New York University (BA); Columbia University (JD)
- Occupation: Law professor
- Employer: University of Michigan Law School
- Known for: Miranda warning

Yale Kamisar (August 29, 1929 – January 30, 2022) was an American legal scholar and writer who was the Clarence Darrow Distinguished University Professor of Law Emeritus and professor emeritus of law at the University of Michigan Law School. A "nationally recognized authority on constitutional law and criminal procedure", Kamisar is known as the "father of Miranda" for his influential role in the landmark U.S. Supreme Court decision in Miranda v. Arizona (1966).

== Early life and education ==
Kamisar was born in New York City on August 29, 1929. His parents were Jewish immigrants from Eastern Europe. His father, Samuel (1903–1976), worked as a bakery salesman; his mother, Mollie (Levine) (1909–1985), was a housewife. His twin sister was Bernice Adler née Kamisar (1929–2017). Kamisar was awarded a scholarship to study at New York University, where he was a member of the Army Reserve Officers' Training Corps. After graduating with a Bachelor of Arts in 1950, he was accepted into Columbia Law School, but was forced to put his studies on hiatus to serve in the Korean War from 1951 to 1953. He commanded an assault platoon during the war and fought at the famous T-bone Hill, where he was injured and was consequently conferred the Purple Heart. He also received the Combat Infantryman Badge. Kamisar went back to Columbia and graduated in 1954, ranking second in his graduating class.

== Career ==
Kamisar initially practiced law at Covington & Burling in Washington, D.C. He specialized in antitrust law and was mentored by Dean Acheson, who had been Secretary of State under Harry S. Truman. However, he became disenchanted with private practice, and decided to become a law professor.

Kamisar taught at the University of Minnesota Law School from 1957 to 1964 and joined the University of Michigan Law School faculty in 1965. He was the author of many books. He wrote Police Interrogation and Confessions: Essays in Law and Policy (1980), which is the "leading commentary on the procedures of criminal justice" and was described by Francis A. Allen as "one of the great achievements of legal scholarship since the end of the Second World War." Kamisar also co-wrote Criminal Justice in Our Time. He wrote extensively on the U.S. Supreme Court, authoring five annual volumes of The Supreme Court: Trends and Developments, as well as the chapters on criminal procedure for The Burger Court: The Counter-Revolution That Wasn't, The Burger Years, and The Warren Court: A Retrospective. He was also the co-author of all ten editions of the casebook Modern Criminal Procedure: Cases, Comments & Questions (with Wayne R. LaFave, Jerold Israel, Orin S. Kerr, and Eve L. Brensike), and all nine editions of the casebook Constitutional Law: Cases, Comments & Questions.

Over thirty Supreme Court opinions have cited Kamisar's works; and "citations to his writings by other federal courts, as well as state courts, number far into the hundreds." The first Supreme Court case to do so was Gideon v. Wainwright (1963), which found that the right to counsel enshrined in the Sixth Amendment encompassed criminal proceedings in state courts. His writings were arguably the most influential in Miranda v. Arizona (1966). He authored a long essay one year earlier in which he likened the country's legal system to a gatehouse and a mansion, which symbolized the interrogation room of a police station and the courtroom, respectively. While there were comprehensive safeguards offered in the latter venue stemming from the Fifth Amendment, there were no such safeguards in the former. He asserted that no system of justice could be sustained if it was grounded on compelled statements from the defendant. The court cited his essay in holding that a defendant had to be advised of their right to silence and right to counsel before police could question them. He was consequently dubbed the "father of Miranda".

After Kamisar retired from full-time teaching at Michigan after 40 years, the Michigan Law Review published tributes to him written by Justice Ruth Bader Ginsburg, Judge Harry T. Edwards of the U.S. Court of Appeals for the District of Columbia Circuit, Wayne R. LaFave, Marc Spindelman, Jerold H. Israel, Eve L. Brensike, Welsh S. White, and Jeffrey S. Lehman, among others.

Kamisar joined the faculty at the University of San Diego School of Law in 2000 and became a full-time, tenured professor there in 2002. He retired from the faculty in 2011, and was a guest lecturer at the University of Washington School of Law.

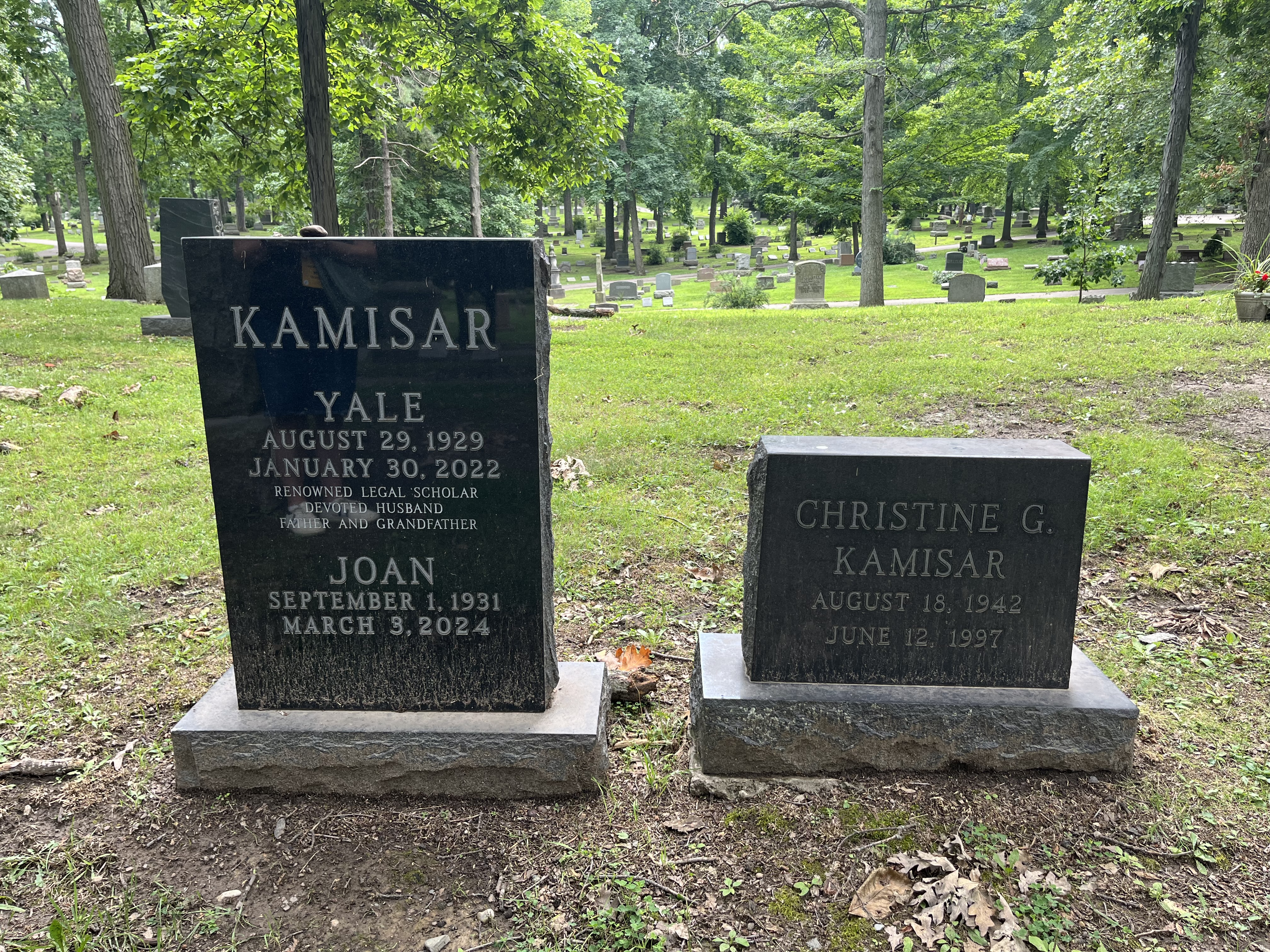
Gravestones of Yale Kamisar, second wife Christine, and third wife Joan in Forest Hill Cemetery

== Personal life ==
Kamisar was married three times: to Dr. Esther Englander until their divorce, to Christine Keller until her death in 1997, and finally to Joan Russell until his death. He had three sons David, Gordon and Jonathan with his first wife.

Kamisar died on January 30, 2022, at his home in Ann Arbor, Michigan. He was 92 years old, and was buried at Forest Hill Cemetery.
