= Michigan Law Review =

- Discipline: Law
- Language: English
- Edited by: Raisha A. Waller (2026-2027)

Publication details
- History: 1902–present
- Publisher: University of Michigan Law School (United States)
- Frequency: Monthly
- Impact factor: 1.89 (2022)

Standard abbreviations
- Bluebook: Mich. L. Rev.
- ISO 4: Mich. Law Rev.

Indexing
- ISSN: 0026-2234
- JSTOR: 00262234
- OCLC no.: 1757366

Links
- Journal homepage; Online access; Online archive

The Michigan Law Review is an American law review and the flagship law journal of the University of Michigan Law School.

== History ==
The Michigan Law Review was established in 1902, after Gustavus Ohlinger, a student in the Law Department (now the Law School) of the University of Michigan, approached the dean with a proposal for a law journal. The Michigan Law Review was originally intended as a forum in which the faculty of the Law Department could publish its legal scholarship. The faculty resolution creating the Michigan Law Review required every faculty member to submit two articles per year to the new journal.

From its inception until 1940, the Michigan Law Review's student members worked under the direction of faculty members who served as editor-in-chief. The first of these was Floyd Mechem, the last Paul Kauper. In 1940, the first student editor-in-chief was selected. During the years that followed, student editors were given increasing responsibility and autonomy; today, the Michigan Law Review is run with no faculty supervision. The current Editor-in-Chief is Raisha Waller. Day-to-day production operations are overseen by the current Managing Editor for Publication, Emi Owens, Managing Editor for Production, Kirby Goodman, and Managing Editor for Development, Nadia Cianca.

Seven of each volume's eight issues ordinarily are composed of two major parts: "Articles" by legal scholars and practitioners and "Notes" written by the student editors. One issue in each volume is devoted to book reviews. Occasionally special issues are devoted to symposia or colloquia.

== Rankings ==
In 2016, PrawfsBlawg ranked the Michigan Law Review as the sixth best law journal by weighing its Google Scholar Metrics law journal ranking, US News Peer Reputation Ranking, US News Overall Ranking, and the W&L Combined Ranking. Based on data from 2009 through 2016, Washington and Lee University School of Law ranked the Michigan Law Review as the seventh best law journal. According to Google Scholar Metrics, the Michigan Law Review was the seventh best law journal in 2015 and the sixth best law journal in 2014.

According to Washington and Lee University School of Law's Law Library, the Michigan Law Review is the seventh most cited law journal in academic works, being cited in journals 3888 times between 2009 and 2016, and the sixth most cited law journal by courts, being cited in 128 cases between 2009 and 2016. As of 2012, the Michigan Law Review has published 4 of the 100 most cited law journal articles of all time—the fifth highest of any law journal. Of the 95 articles that constitute the 5 most cited law journal articles from each year between 1991 and 2009, 9 of them were published by the Michigan Law Review—the 5th most of any law journal.

== Significant articles ==
- Charles Noble Gregory, Jurisdiction over Foreign Ships in Territorial Waters, 2 Mich. L. Rev. 333 (1904).
- John A. Fairlie, Administrative Legislation, 18 Mich. L. Rev. 181 (1920).
- William L. Prosser, Intentional Infliction of Mental Suffering: A New Tort, 37 Mich. L. Rev. 874 (1939).
- John P. Dawson, Economic Duress—An Essay in Perspective, 45 Mich. L. Rev. 253 (1947).
- Samuel D. Estep, Radiation Injuries and Statistics: The Need for a New Approach to Injury Litigation, 59 Mich. L. Rev. 259 (1960).
- Joseph L. Sax, The Public Trust Doctrine in Natural Resource Law: Effective Judicial Intervention, 68 Mich. L. Rev. 471 (1970).
- Richard O. Lempert, Modeling Relevance, 75 Mich. L. Rev. 1021 (1977).
- John Braithwaite, Enforced Self-Regulation: A New Strategy for Corporate Crime Control, 80 Mich. L. Rev. 1466 (1982).
- Thomas S. Ulen, The Efficiency of Specific Performance: Toward a Unified Theory of Contract Remedies, 83 Mich. L. Rev. 341 (1984).
- Mari J. Matsuda, Public Response to Racist Speech: Considering the Victim's Story, 87 Mich. L. Rev. 2320 (1989).
- Richard Delgado, Storytelling for Oppositionists and Others: A Plea for Narrative, 87 Mich. L. Rev. 2411 (1989).
- Cass R. Sunstein, What's Standing After Lujan? Of Citizen Suits, "Injuries," and Article III, 91 Mich. L. Rev. 163 (1992).
- Daniel C. Esty, Revitalizing Environmental Federalism, 95 Mich. L. Rev. 570 (1996).
- Richard H. McAdams, The Origin, Development, and Regulation of Norms, 96 Mich. L. Rev. 338 (1997).
- William J. Stuntz, The Pathological Politics of Criminal Law, 100 Mich. L. Rev. 505 (2001).

== Notable alumni ==
- Steven G. Bradbury, former head of the Office of Legal Counsel
- David W. Belin, assistant counsel to the Warren Commission
- Francis X. Beytagh, former dean, Ohio State University Moritz College of Law
- Charles Blakey Blackmar, former Chief Justice, Supreme Court of Missouri
- Michael T. Cahill, Dean of Brooklyn Law School
- Ann Coulter, conservative commentator, author, and syndicated columnist
- George E. Cryer, former mayor of Los Angeles
- David M. Ebel, judge, United States Court of Appeals for the Tenth Circuit
- Harry T. Edwards, former Chief Judge, United States Court of Appeals for the District of Columbia Circuit
- Heidi Li Feldman, law professor
- Jeffrey L. Fisher, Supreme Court litigator
- Heather K. Gerken, dean, Yale Law School
- Ronald Gould, judge, United States Court of Appeals for the Ninth Circuit
- Robert Jerry, dean of the University of Florida Levin College of Law
- Alex Joel, first Civil Liberties Protection Officer for the Office of the Director of National Intelligence
- Sally Katzen, former administrator of OIRA
- W. Wallace Kent, former judge, United States Court of Appeals for the Sixth Circuit
- Dave Kopel, conservative pundit and blogger
- Leah Litman, University of Michigan Law School law professor and co-host of the podcast Strict Scrutiny
- Jeffrey P. Minear, counselor to Supreme Court Chief Justice John Roberts.
- Ronald L. Olson, "name partner" in the Los Angeles office of the law firm of Munger, Tolles & Olson LLP
- Doug Pappas, baseball writer and researcher who was considered the foremost expert on the business of baseball
- John Porter, former United States Representative from Illinois
- Eli Savit, Attorney General-elect of Michigan
- Daniel Tarullo, member of the Board of Governors of the Federal Reserve System
- David Westin, President of ABC News
- James D. Zirin, lawyer, writer and cable TV talk show host

== Elected Boards (recent volumes) ==
| Volume (year) | Editor-in-Chief | Managing Editor (Publication) | Managing Editor (Development) | Managing Editor (Production) |
|---|---|---|---|---|
| Vol. 125 (2026–2027) | Raisha A. Waller | Emi Danielle Owens | Nadia Yeajin Cianca | Kirby D. Goodman |
| Vol. 124 (2025–2026) | Heather Jane Foster | Nathaniel B. Magrath | Delpha Carpenter | Avery E. Coombe |
| Vol. 123 (2024–2025) | Sunita Ganesh | Emily Yuri Lovell | Kamryn L. Sannicks | Savannah M. Miracle |
| Vol. 122 (2023–2024) | Carter E. Brace | Robert N. Brewer | James "Tre" W. Fitts III | Margaret R. Larin |
| Vol. 121 (2022–2023) | Dashaya J. Foreman | Nia C. Vogel | Matthew D. Feng | Michaela Olson |
| Vol. 120 (2021–2022) | Ahmed Rizk | Julianna B. St. Onge | Shana Toor | Emily M. Statham |
| Vol. 119 (2020–2021) | Sophia W. Montgomery | Alexander J. Bau | Deborah Won | Loren M. Lee |

== Parody ==
The Michigan Raw Review, a parody of the Michigan Law Review, was published annually by the Barristers Society, a self-styled honorary at the University of Michigan Law School. The Raw Review used the same cover, layout, and typeface, but contained content totally dissimilar, leaning to the "insulting and semi-pornographic".
