= César Cuauhtémoc García Hernández =

American scholar of migration studies

- Occupations: Attorney, Scholar
- Awards: Fulbright Scholar

Academic background
- Education: Brown University (BA); Boston College (JD)

César Cuauhtémoc García Hernández is an American scholar of migration studies and Gregory Williams Chair in Civil Rights and Civil Liberties at The Ohio State University Moritz College of Law. He supports abolishing immigration detention in the United States. García Hernández is one of the ten most-cited immigration law scholars in the United States.

In 2020, García Hernández delivered the Buck Colbert Franklin Memorial Civil Rights Lecture at the University of Tulsa, named for the African-American lawyer who devoted countless hours to assisting victims of the Tulsa race massacre. In 2019, the Civil Rights Education and Enforcement Center honored him with its Challenging Discrimination Award. García Hernández is a past Fulbright Scholar, where he conducted a comparative study of immigration imprisonment in Slovenia and the United States and has been a scholar-in-residence at the University of California, Berkeley and Texas Southern University. García Hernández is also a past recipient of the Derrick A. Bell, Jr. Award by the Association of American Law Schools Section on Minority Groups, an honor issued to a “junior faculty member who, through activism, mentoring, colleagueship, teaching and scholarship, has made an extraordinary contribution to legal education, the legal system or social justice.” García Hernández has served two terms on the American Bar Association Commission on Immigration.

García Hernández graduated from Brown University with a Bachelors of Arts with Honors in American Civilization and English in 2002 and Boston College Law School with a Juris Doctor in 2007. As a law student García Hernández was a law review editor for the Third World Law Journal.

== Books ==
- García Hernández, César Cuauhtémoc (2015). Crimmigration Law. American Bar Association. ISBN 978-1-62722-387-4.
- García Hernández, César Cuauhtémoc (2019). Migrating to Prison: America's Obsession with Locking Up Immigrants. The New Press. ISBN 978-1-62097-421-6.
- García Hernández, César Cuauhtémoc (2024). Welcome the Wretched "In Defense of the "Criminal Alien". The New Press. ISBN 978-1-62097-779-8.

== Select Academic Works ==
- García Hernández, César Cuauhtémoc (2012). "The Perverse Logic of Immigration Detention: Unraveling the Rationality of Imprisoning Immigrants Based on Markers of Race and Class Otherness". Columbia Journal of Race and Law. 1: 353. SSRN 2133300.
- García Hernández, César Cuauhtémoc (2012). "Criminal Defense after Padilla v. Kentucky". Georgetown Immigration Law Review. 26: 475. SSRN 2281612.
- García Hernández, César Cuauhtémoc (2013). "Creating Crimmigration". Brigham Young University Law Review. 2013: 1457. SSRN 2393662.
- García Hernández, César Cuauhtémoc (2014). "Immigration Detention as Punishment". UCLA Law Review. 61 (5). SSRN 2321219.
- García Hernández, César Cuauhtémoc (2017). "Abolishing Immigration Prisons". Boston University Law Review. 97 (245). SSRN 2929668.
