= John Jay Adams =

American lawyer and judge

5th Dean of Moritz College of Law
- In office 1909–1926
- Preceded by: George W. Rightmire
- Succeeded by: Alonzo H. Tuttle

Personal details
- Education: Kenyon College
- Occupation: Professor; Lawyer; Administrator

John J. Adams (1860–1926) was an American lawyer and judge. He served as the 5th Dean of the Ohio State University Moritz College of Law from 1909 to 1926.

== Early life ==
Adams was a practitioner at the Muskingum County bar and for six years judge of the Judicial Circuit of Ohio, he was born on 18 November 1860, on his father's farm (Prospect Place) near Dresden, Ohio, his parents being the late George Willison and Mary J. R. Adams. His primary education was obtained in the district schools and was continued in the High School at Dresden and Zanesville, Ohio, being graduated from the latter institution with the class of June 1875. His more specifically literary education was acquired in Kenyon College, at Gambier, Ohio, which he entered in the fall of 1875, completing the course there by graduation with the class of 1879. Through the succeeding three years he engaged in teaching in Harcourt Place Academy, at Gambier, Ohio, a private boarding school for boys, and in September 1880, he entered upon the study of law under the direction of the Honorable Moses M. Granger, of Zanesville. Following his careful preliminary reading he was admitted to the Ohio bar, January 2, 1883, entering upon the practice of his chosen profession in partnership with Colonel Gilbert D. Munson, under the firm name of Munson and Adams, which relation was maintained from the spring of 1883 until November 1893, when Colonel Munson was elected to the Common pleas bench.

== Judicial career ==
The following year Adams received the Republican nomination for judge of the Fifth Circuit Court of Ohio, and was elected in November by a plurality of 8,894 votes. The fifth circuit is composed of the counties of Ashland, Richland, Wayne, Stark, Morrow, Delaware, Licking, Knox, Holmes, Tuscarawas, Coshocton, Muskingum, Morgan, Fairfield and Perry. Judge Adams was the first Republican judge elected to the circuit bench in this circuit, large Democratic Party majorities having previously been given. He served on the bench for the full term of six years, from 9 February 1895, until 9 February 1901.

On 26 October 1892, Judge Adams was married to Dora May Black, who died 27 October 1904.

== Academic administrator ==
Adams became the fifth Dean of the Ohio State University Moritz College of Law in 1909. He served in that capacity until six months before his death in 1926. Mr. Adams was also twice "acting President" of the entire University during the period of the First World War when the University President was called away for military service.

== Sources ==
- The Ohio State University Archives.
- History Past & Present of the City of Zanesville and Muskingum County Ohio published in 1909 written by J Hope Sutor.
