= Lincoln Davies =

American legal scholar

Lincoln L. Davies

20th Dean of Moritz College of Law
- In office July 1, 2019 – June 30, 2025
- Preceded by: Alan C. Michaels
- Succeeded by: Kent Barnett

Personal details
- Education: University of Michigan(BS); Stanford University(JD)
- Occupation: Professor; Administrator
- Website: https://profiles.faculty.utah.edu/u0586383/about

Lincoln L. Davies is an American legal academic. Recognized for his expertise in energy law and policy, Davies served as the 20th Dean of The Ohio State University Mortiz College of Law, where he held the Frank R. Strong Chair in Law.

== Scholarly Career ==
From 2019-2024, he served as Dean of The Ohio State University Michael E. Moritz College of Law. Under Davies’ leadership, Ohio State reached its highest-ever ranking, #22 nationally and #8 among all public schools. Ohio State Law also added four endowed professorships under Davies’ tenure, including its first-ever for a clinical professor, and it established expanded student service programs as well as creating a new Immigration Clinic.

== Research ==
Davies’ research focuses on energy law and policy. He has written about laws that promote energy technology, including renewables, clean energy, and carbon capture and storage. He has experience in the electricity sector and has written a variety of articles about management and governance of electricity markets and the grid. He also has written about the intersection of energy and water, and the interface between energy law and environmental law.

== Awards ==
Davies has received awards for both his teaching and research. In 2012, he received the McCloy Fellowship in Environmental Policy. In 2014, the University of Utah named him a Presidential Scholar. In 2024, he was named the inaugural Distinguished Elizabeth Evatt Fellow at the University of Sydney.

== Publications ==
Lincoln Davies is the author of two books, Energy Law and Policy, now in its fourth edition, coauthored with Alexandra Klass, Hari Osofsky, Uma Outka, Joe Tomain, and Elizabeth Wilson, and Energy Law in the United States, coauthored with Joe Tomain.

== Legal Career ==
Davies began his legal career as clerk to Associate Chief Justice Leonard H. Russon of the Utah Supreme Court from 2001 to 2002. After his clerkship, Davies was an associate of the Energy & Natural Resources, Technology, and Litigation Groups at Steptoe LLP until 2007. He was then appointed as a professor of law at the S.J. Quinney College of Law where he was later appointed associate dean for academic affairs and Hugh B. Brown Presidential Endowed Chair in Law. In 2019, Davies succeeded Alan C. Michaels as dean of Ohio State University's Moritz College of Law. During his deanship, Davies additionally held the Frank R. Strong Chair in Law. Davies stepped down at the end of his first term as dean, and was replaced by L. Camille Hébert on an acting basis. Currently, Davies is a professor of law at the University of Utah S.J. Quinney College of Law, where he serves as the Executive Director for Energy, Resource, and Environment Programs and Co-Director of the Wallace Stegner Center for Land, Resources, and the Environment.

== Education ==
Davies graduated from the University of Michigan with honors and distinction and a bachelor's of science in natural resources and environment in 1997. He then received his J.D. Degree from the Stanford Law School in 2000, where he was Editor-in-Chief of the Stanford Environmental Law Journal and a member of the Stanford Law Review.
