= Kwoka =

Kwoka is a surname. Notable people with the surname include:

- Czesława Kwoka (1928–1943), Polish Catholic child persecuted by Nazis
- Rebecca Perkins Kwoka (born 1982), American politician in New Hampshire
- Margaret Kwoka, American legal scholar
