= Huefner =

Huefner is a surname. Notable people with the surname include:

- Benjamin Huefner (born 1991), German ice hockey player
- Steven F. Huefner, American legal scholar
