= L. Orin Slagle =

L. Orin Slagle, Jr.

3rd Dean of FSU College of Law
- In office 1980–1984
- Preceded by: Joshua Morse
- Succeeded by: Sandy D'Alemberte

14th Dean of Moritz College of Law
- In office 1974–1978
- Preceded by: James C. Kirby
- Succeeded by: James E. Meeks

Personal details
- Born: South Charleston, Ohio
- Died: December 26, 2006 Sedgwick, Maine
- Education: Ohio State (B.A.); Ohio State (J.D.)
- Occupation: Professor; Lawyer; Administrator

L. Orin Slagle, Jr. was the third Dean of the Florida State University College of Law, President of the Law School Admission Council, and the fourteenth Dean of the Ohio State University Moritz College of Law.

== Education ==
Slagle earned his bachelor's degree from the Ohio State University in 1954. He then received his Juris Doctor degree from the Ohio State University Moritz College of Law in 1957.

== Legal career ==
Slagle begin his legal career at Mudge, Stern, Baldwin and Todd in New York, New York before moving to England to serve in the U.S. Air Force Judge Advocate General Corps, where he attained the rank of captain. Slagle entered academia in 1961 when he returned to the Ohio State University Moritz College of Law, where he served as assistant professor, professor and then as associate dean. In 1968, Slagle become a partner at the Dargusch and Day law firm in Columbus, Ohio. He then returned to Ohio State to serve as the fourteenth Dean of the Moritz College of Law from 1974 to 1980. Slagle then served as the President of the Law School Admission Council from 1978 to 1980 while continuing his full-time teaching at Moritz. In 1980 Slagle was appointed the third Dean of the Florida State University College of Law and served in that role until 1984 when he returned to full-time teaching.

Academic offices
Preceded by Joshua Morse	Dean of FSU College of Law; 1980-1984	Succeeded by Sandy D'Alemberte
Academic offices
Preceded by James C. Kirby	Dean of Moritz College of Law; 1974-1978	Succeeded by James E. Meeks
