= Alan Michaels =

Alan Michaels may refer to:

- Alan C. Michaels, law professor
- Al Michaels (Alan Richard Michaels, born 1944), American television sportscaster
- Alan Michaels, DJ at WMXJ
