= Black Feminist Anthropology =

2001 book edited by Irma McClaurin

Black Feminist Anthropology: Theory, Politics, Praxis, and Poetics
- Editor: Irma McClaurin
- Language: English
- Subject: Black feminism
- Publisher: Rutgers University Press
- Publication date: 2001
- Publication place: United States
- Pages: 296 pages
- ISBN: 0813529263
- OCLC: 52870535

Black Feminist Anthropology: Theory, Politics, Praxis, and Poetics, published on 1 August 2001 through Rutgers University Press, is a collection of essays from nine Black feminist anthropologists. The book was edited by Irma McClaurin, who also wrote the collection's foreword and one of the essays. Each essay focuses on a specific topic that correlates to the general subject of Black Feminist Anthropology, including the intersectionality between race and gender. With each chapter written through the perspective of a different anthropologist, the book highlights how both the issues of race and gender work in conjunction to shape Black women’s experiences and ideas, particularly in the anthropological field.

== Content ==
- Introduction: Forging a Theory, Politics, Prazis, and Poetics of Black Feminist Anthropology by Irma McClaurin
1. Seeking the Ancestors: Forging A Black Feminist Tradition in Anthropology by Lynn Bolles
2. Theorizing a Black Feminist Self in Anthropology: Toward an Autoethnographic Approach by Irma McClaurin
3. A Passion for Sameness: Encountering A Black Feminist Self in Fieldwork in the Dominican Republic by Kimberly Eison Simmons
4. Disciplining the Black Female Body: Learning Feminism in Africa and the United States by Carolyn Martin Shaw
  - In this chapter, Carolyn Martin Shaw focuses on the connection between mind and body, and how it pertains to gender. In particular, she talks about her past experiences when trying to separate the two and fit into the gender role that was expected of her. One issue Shaw spent time looking at was the expectation of being both smart and shy, while at the same time, wanting to be "sexy and alluring". She attempted to be a good woman and make her family and the Black community proud, but she also believed that you could be a good woman while enjoying sexual things. On top of that, she also knew that if she didn’t follow the gender, as well as racial, constructions that were placed on her she would also be attacked by the White community and be labeled as a whore, which is representative of the conflicts between being a Black person and being a woman. Preconceived distinctions between race and gender followed Shaw to her marriage, where despite doing everything right, her husband did not treat her as his equal. He expected her to take care of their child because, according to him, men had no business doing that. Shaw's experience clearly illustrates the complexity between race and gender, which often involve discrepancies in what one wants, what one thinks is right, what is expected of oneself, and what one ultimately chooses to do.
5. Negotiating Identity and Black Feminist Politics in Caribbean Research by Karla Slocum
6. A Black Feminist Perspective on the Sexual Commodification of Women in the New Global Culture by Angela M. Gilliam
  - In this chapter, Angela M. Gilliam shares her experience as a Black woman living in Brazil and the similarities it shares with her experiences in the United States. According to Gilliam, there is much Western influence in Brazil, such as Black women being seen only for domestic house work, as well as being viewed as seductive in their youth but later defeminized as they become mature to fix the role of a nurturer-nanny-maid. Women in Brazil are also objectified as easily accessible and advertised in tourist pamphlets for Westerners, including the first Playboy magazine in 1975, published in Portuguese. In discussing these topics, Gilliam illustrates that racism and sexism are not exclusive to the US, but rather ubiquitous issues that are found across the world.
7. Biomedical Ethics, Gender, and Ethnicity: Implications for Black Feminist Anthropology by Cheryl Mwaria
8. Contingent Stories of Anthropology, Race, and Feminism by Paulla A. Ebron
  - In this chapter, Paulla A. Ebron details her curiosity from her own memories of events regarding anthropology, race, and feminism. Ebron recalls feeling very intrigued with cultural differences that could be observed within the current events around her. Reflecting back on the events that occurred throughout her life, she grasps a new perception of the way society plays a role. Her memories correlate to her experiences with this revelation, representing both the knowledge she gained, and also her ability to teach others using her stories. In this regard, Ebron highlights the power of using curiosity to obtain and spread knowledge about important aspects in society.
9. A Homegirl Goes Home: Black Feminism and the Lure of Native Anthropology by Cheryl Rodriguez
  - In this chapter, Cheryl Rodriguez discusses the intersectionality between Black and feminist identities, and the complexity of these identities within the field of native anthropology. The chapter has three main focuses: the societal challenges Black feminists as intellectuals historically face, the importance of empowering Black feminist voices, and the political implications of studying Black feminism at the native level. Rodriguez argues that the social and economic obstacles faced particularly by Black women equip them with unique knowledge that is vital to the discussion of Black feminism. Additionally, she highlights the need for these voices to advance in anthropological spaces in order to promote better understanding of what exactly it means to be a Black feminist. Finally, she points out the value of diversity in native Black feminist anthropological research, encouraging a fair representation between the participant's perspective as well as that of the researcher.

== Reception ==
Critical reception for Black Feminist Anthropology has largely been positive, for example:

- Marla Fredrick's review in Contemporary Sociology.
- Choice Reviews Online praised the work, stating it was a "refreshing and inspiring collection of nine articles and a superb introduction seeks to come to terms with, if not resolve, the triple contradictions found in the title."
- Yolanda T. Moses of Anthropological Quarterly also praised Black Feminist Anthropology, stating that it was "a very important and provocative book".

Another reviewer, for American Anthropologist, was somewhat critical of the work, commenting that he would have liked to have seen more information and discussion in the book, using Karla Slocum's conversational interview style as an example and stated that she did not:

explain whether it mattered that she was not, in fact, a market woman who had to compete with her informants in the marketplace, nor did she have to survive on the proceeds of her labor there. Like her professional colleagues, she chose to be a participant-observer and could choose to terminate the experiment at will.
