= Bernard Wolfman =

American lawyer

Dean Bernard Wolfman
- Born: July 8, 1924; Philadelphia, Pennsylvania, US
- Died: August 20, 2011 (aged 87); West Orange, New Jersey, US
- Education: University of Pennsylvania (A.B., political science 1946); University of Pennsylvania Law School (J.D. 1948)
- Known for: Dean of the University of Pennsylvania Law School; Gemmill Professor of Tax Law and Tax Policy (University of Pennsylvania Law School); Fessenden Professor of Law (Harvard Law School)
- Notable work: Dissent Without Opinion: The Behavior of Justice William O. Douglas in Tax Cases (1975)

Bernard Wolfman (July 8, 1924 – August 20, 2011) was the dean of the University of Pennsylvania Law School, as well as its Gemmill Professor of Tax Law and Tax Policy, and the Fessenden Professor of Law at Harvard Law School.

== Biography ==
Wolfman was born in Philadelphia, Pennsylvania, to Nathan and Elizabeth (Coff) Wolfman, and was Jewish.

He fought in Germany in December 1944, in World War II.

He earned an A.B. in political science from the University of Pennsylvania in 1946, and a J.D. from the University of Pennsylvania Law School in 1948.

After graduation, he was a lawyer for 15 years at the firm of Wolf, Block, Schorr and Solis-Cohen in Philadelphia, from 1948 to 1963, and was the firm's managing partner from 1961 to 1963.

In 1963, Wolfman started teaching at the University of Pennsylvania Law School. He was the law school's Gemmill Professor of Tax Law and Tax Policy, and was Dean of the University of Pennsylvania Law School from 1970 to 1975. In 1976, he became the Fessenden Professor of Law at Harvard Law School in 1976, holding that position until 2007. Wolfman was an expert in tax, ethics, and lawyers' professional responsibility.

Wolfman wrote a great number of articles and essays. He also authored four books, including Dissent Without Opinion: The Behavior of Justice William O. Douglas in Tax Cases (1975).

He received an honorary Doctor of Laws degree from the Jewish Theological Seminary of America in 1971, and an honorary Doctor of Laws degree from Capital University in 1990.

He was married first to Zelda Bernstein Wolfman, and after her death to Toni Wolfman, and had five children. Wolfman resided in Elkins Park, Pennsylvania, where he and his family attended Beth Sholom Congregation, and Cambridge, Massachusetts.

He died from heart failure at 87 years of age in West Orange, New Jersey.

Preceded by Jefferson B. Fordham	Dean of the University of Pennsylvania Law School; 1970–1977	Succeeded by Louis H. Pollak
