= Alexander Joel =

Alexander Joel is the name of:

- Alexander Joel (conductor) (born 1971), British classical pianist and conductor
- Alexander Joel (official), first American Civil Liberties Protection Officer for the U.S. Office of the Director of National Intelligence
