= James E. Meeks =

James Edwin Meeks

15th dean of Moritz College of Law
- In office 1978–1985
- Preceded by: L. Orin Slagle
- Succeeded by: Francis X. Beytagh

Personal details
- Born: November 8, 1938 Morgantown, West Virginia
- Died: October 26, 2017 (aged 78) Columbus, Ohio
- Education: Oberlin (B.A.); Columbia (J.D.)
- Occupation: Professor; Lawyer; Administrator
- Website: James E. Meeks

James E. Meeks was the fifteenth dean and professor emeritus of law at the Ohio State University Moritz College of Law.

== Education ==
Meeks earned his bachelor's degree from the Oberlin College. He then received his Juris Doctor degree from the Columbia Law School, where he was served as an editor of the Columbia Law Review.

== Legal career ==
Meeks began his legal career as a clerk for Judge Carl McGowan of the U.S. Court of Appeals for the District of Columbia Circuit. He then taught law at the University of Iowa College of Law from 1964 to 1978, and also served as associate dean. In 1978, the Ohio State University Board of Trustees named Meeks the fifteenth dean of the Moritz College of Law. During his tenure between 1978 and 1985, Meeks also served as special assistant to the president of the university – Legal Affairs.

== Scholarly work ==
Meeks scholarly work focused on torts and antitrust. He authored Antitrust Concerns in the Modern Public Utility Environment (National Regulatory Research Institute 1996) and co-authored with George C. Christie, Cases and Materials on the Law of Torts (West 1990).

Academic offices
Preceded by L. Orin Slagle	Dean of Moritz College of Law; 1978-1985	Succeeded by Francis X. Beytagh
