= Kent Barnett =

American legal scholar

Kent Harris Barnett is an American jurist and legal scholar. Since 2024, he has been Dean of the Moritz College of Law.

== Early life ==
Barnett was born in Kentucky and earned a Bachelor's of Arts degree in art history at Centre College (2002) before obtaining his Juris Doctor at the University of Kentucky College of Law (2005).

== Career ==
After completing his legal education, Barnett clerked for John M. Rogers, then practiced commercial litigation at Weil, Gotshal & Manges, followed by product liability law at Heygood, Orr & Pearson. Barnett began his teaching career as the first visiting assistant professor at the University of Kentucky College of Law, then joined the University of Georgia School of Law in 2012, where he became J. Alton Hosch Professor of Law and served as associate dean for academic affairs. In 2024, Barnett was appointed dean of Ohio State University's Moritz College of Law, succeeding full-time dean Lincoln L. Davies and acting dean L. Camille Hébert. His tenure began on August 15, 2024.
