= Robert Beezer =

American judge (1928–2012)

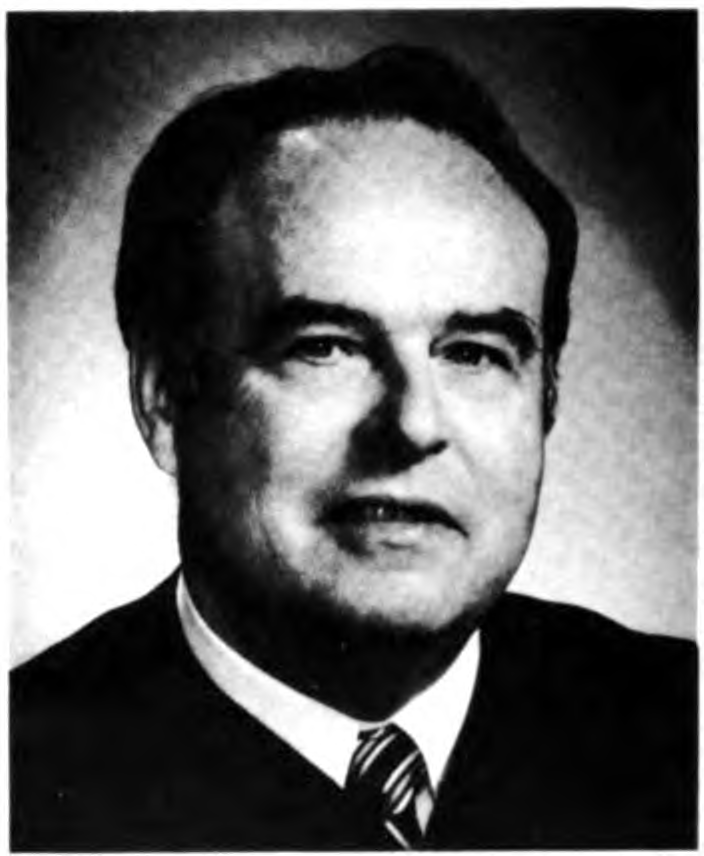

Senior Judge of the United States Court of Appeals for the Ninth Circuit
- In office July 31, 1996 – March 30, 2012

Judge of the United States Court of Appeals for the Ninth Circuit
- In office March 28, 1984 – July 31, 1996
- Appointed by: Ronald Reagan
- Preceded by: Eugene Allen Wright
- Succeeded by: Ronald M. Gould

Personal details
- Born: Robert Renaut Beezer; July 21, 1928 Seattle, Washington
- Died: March 30, 2012 (aged 83) Seattle, Washington
- Education: University of Virginia (BA, LLB)

Robert Renaut Beezer (July 21, 1928 – March 30, 2012) was a United States circuit judge of the United States Court of Appeals for the Ninth Circuit.

== Education and career ==
Born in Seattle, Washington, Beezer received a Bachelor of Arts degree from the University of Virginia in 1951 and a Bachelor of Laws from the University of Virginia School of Law in 1956. He was a United States Marine Corps Reserve Lieutenant from 1951 to 1953. He was in private practice in Seattle from 1956 to 1984, serving as a Judge pro tem on the Seattle Municipal Court from 1962 to 1976.

== Federal judicial service ==
On March 2, 1984, Beezer was nominated by President Ronald Reagan to a seat on the United States Court of Appeals for the Ninth Circuit vacated by Judge Eugene Allen Wright. Beezer was confirmed by the United States Senate on March 27, 1984, and received his commission on March 28, 1984. He assumed senior status on July 31, 1996.

== Death ==
Beezer died from lung cancer in Seattle on March 30, 2012, at age 83.

Legal offices
Preceded by Eugene Allen Wright	Judge of the United States Court of Appeals for the Ninth Circuit; 1984–1996	Succeeded by Ronald M. Gould
