= Francis X. Beytagh =

American law professor (1935–2016)

16th Dean of Moritz College of Law
- In office 1985–1993
- Preceded by: James E. Meeks
- Succeeded by: Gregory H. Williams

Dean of University of Toledo College of Law
- In office 1976–1983

Personal details
- Born: July 11, 1935 Savannah, Georgia
- Died: February 21, 2016 (aged 80) Dublin, Ohio
- Education: Notre Dame (B.A.); Michigan (J.D.)
- Occupation: Professor; Lawyer; Administrator
- Website: Francis X. Beytagh

Francis Xavier Beytagh (July 11, 1935 – February 21, 2016) was the thirteenth Dean and Professor Emeritus of Law at the Ohio State University Moritz College of Law. Beytagh was a senior law clerk to chief justice Earl Warren of the United States Supreme Court from 1963 to 1964.

== Education ==
Beytagh earned his bachelor's degree magna cum laude from the University of Notre Dame in 1956. He then received his J.D. degree from the University of Michigan School of Law in 1959, where he ranked first in his class and served as Editor-in-Chief of the Michigan Law Review.

== Military service ==
After graduating from Notre Dame, Beytagh was commissioned as an officer in the United States Navy and served onboard the USS Borie (DD-704) and USS Picuda (SS-382). He served another 20 years in the United States Navy Reserve and retired with the rank of Captain.

== Legal career ==
Beytagh began his legal career as a Senior Law Clerk for Chief Justice Earl Warren of the United States Supreme Court from 1963 to 1964. He then spent two years working for Jones Day in Cleveland, Ohio. From 1966 to 1970, Beytagh was an Assistant to the Solicitor General of the United States Thurgood Marshall, where he argued before the United States Supreme Court representing the United States in Avery v. Midland County, 390 U.S. 474, which applied the Equal Protection Clause of the U.S. Constitution to the appointment of state legislatures.

Beytagh entered academia in 1970 when he returned to his alma mater to teach at the Notre Dame Law School. Beytagh next served as the Dean of the University of Toledo College of Law from 1976 to 1983. In 1984, he served as the Cullen Professor of Law at the University of Houston Law Center and was a Fulbright Fellow at Trinity College in Dublin, Ireland. In 1985, the Ohio State University Board of Trustees named Beytagh the sixteenth Dean of the Moritz College of Law. During his tenure between 1985 and 1993, Beytagh oversaw the Moritz College of Law’s $15 million Centennial Campaign, development of the College’s program in alternative dispute resolution, its partnership with Oxford University, and a $19 million addition to Drinko Hall.

== Scholarly work ==
Beytagh scholarly work focused on constitutional law. He was the co-author of Constitutional Law: Cases and Materials (5th edition), and its supplements, and the author of Constitutionalism in Contemporary Ireland (1996).

== See also ==
- List of law clerks for the chief justice of the United States

Academic offices
Preceded by James E. Meeks	Dean of Moritz College of Law; 1985–1993	Succeeded by Gregory H. Williams
