= Ivan C. Rutledge =

College dean

Ivan Cate Rutledge

12th Dean of Moritz College of Law
- In office 1965–1970
- Preceded by: Frank R. Strong
- Succeeded by: James C. Kirby

Personal details
- Born: December 24, 1915 White Pine, Tennessee, US
- Died: January 30, 2000 West Hartford, Connecticut, US
- Spouse: Carroll B. Rutledge
- Education: Carson-Newman College, A.B, Duke, A.M, LL.B, Columbia University, LL.M
- Occupation: Professor; Lawyer; Academic Administrator; Labor Arbitrator

Ivan C. Rutledge (1915–2000) was the twelfth Dean of the Ohio State University Moritz College of Law.

== Education ==
Rutledge received an LL.B from the Duke University School of Law and an LL.M from Columbia Law School.

Academic offices
| Preceded by Frank R. Strong | Dean of Moritz College of Law; 1965-1970 | Succeeded by James C. Kirby |
