= Doug Pappas =

American baseball writer and researcher

Doug Pappas (1961–2004) was an American baseball writer and researcher who was considered a foremost expert on the business of baseball.

Pappas was a graduate of the University of Chicago (1982) and the University of Michigan Law School (1985), where he had been Executive Note Editor of the Michigan Law Review. He attended and graduated from Hackley School in 1978.

== Contributions to baseball research ==
Pappas wrote prolifically about baseball economics, analyzing and debunking what he perceived as false information spread by Major League Baseball and sympathetic media outlets. He railed against claims by Commissioner Bud Selig that the league's teams were in dire financial straits, using the league's own data to refute the claims.

Pappas conducted exhaustive research on player salaries, compiling a database from a variety of sources. His analytical work focused on measuring the performance of a team's front office with a metric called Marginal Wins/Marginal Payroll. This work inspired and informed major league general managers like Billy Beane, and formed the foundation of what would later come to be known as "Moneyball."

He was a regular contributor to Baseball Prospectus from 2001 to 2004 and a listed contributor to the 4th and 5th editions of Total Baseball. Pappas was also very active within the Society for American Baseball Research, in 1994 founding and then chairing the SABR Business of Baseball committee and serving as the organization's parliamentarian. After his death, SABR renamed its USA Today award for the best paper at its annual convention in honor of Pappas:

The Doug Pappas Research Award recognizes the best oral research presentation at the Annual Convention. Before 2004 it was known as The USA Today Sports Weekly Award; the name was changed to honor the late Doug Pappas. USA Today Sports Weekly continues to sponsor both it and the companion award for the best poster presentation.

In eulogizing Pappas, Neal Traven of SABR wrote:

He was a brilliant researcher, blessed with the capacity to digest and describe great volumes of material. Most SABR research stops there, but Doug continued on, to analyze and make sense of what he observed, and to synthesize his insights into recommendations for resolving the problems he addressed...His abiding enthusiasm for baseball and for the American roadside were amply illustrated in the public persona of his writings and his web presence.

== Other interests and contributions ==
In addition to his baseball fandom, Pappas was a lawyer in BigLaw and a photography enthusiast. After graduating from law school, Pappas was an associate at two now-defunct Wall Street firms, Finley, Kumble, Wagner, Underberg, Manley, Myerson & Casey, and then its successor, Myerson & Kuhn. While at Finley Kumble, Pappas represented the former United States Football League in its antitrust suit against the National Football League. He later moved to another New York firm, Mintz & Gold, where his practice concentrated on general civil and commercial litigation.

His unexpected death came on a photographic excursion. After his death, his mother donated more than 500 of his books along with 34 of his photograph albums, and approximately 3,700 of his postcards related to transportation to the University of Michigan's Transportation History Collection of the Special Collections Library.

== Doug Pappas Award winners ==
2025

- Jason A. Schwartz, “The ‘Savior’ Does Not Answer Letters: Dave Hoskins and the Uneven, Unheralded, and Unfinished Integration of the Texas League”

2024

- David W. Smith, “Where Did the 24 Minutes Go?”

2023

- David Firstman, “Dan Uggla: History’s Most Unlikely Hitting Streak?”

2022

- John Asel, “Meta Pitch Tracking: How The Changes In Pitch Tracking Technologies Should Change How We Look At The Data They Collect”

2019

- Mark Pankin, “Baseball’s Most Confounding Rule”

2018

- Callie Batts Maddox, ” ‘Ty Cobb has Nothing on Her’: Early Twentieth Century Women’s Collegiate Baseball in Ohio”

2017

- Chuck Hildebrandt, “Does Changing Leagues Affect Player Performance, and How?”

2016

- David W. Smith, “The Myth of the Closer”

2015

- Chuck Hildebrandt, “‘Little League Home Runs’ in MLB History”

2014

- Michael Haupert, “William Hulbert and the Birth of the Business of Professional Baseball”

2013

- Vince Gennaro, “Analyzing Batter Performance Against Pitcher Clusters”

2012

- Rob Fitts, “Murderers, Spies, and Ballplayers: The Untold Story of the 1934 All American Tour of Asia”

2011

- Ross Davies, “Toolson’s Secrets: A Close Call for the Baseball Antitrust Exemption”

2010

- Ross Davies, “Chinese-US Baseball Diplomacy before the Great War”

2009

- Tim Herlich, “21”

2008

- Vince Gennaro, “What Factors Influence Free Agent Salaries?”

2007

- Cait Murphy, “Cover-up: Gambling, Corruption, and the Wild Finish of the 1908 Season”

2006

- Sean Forman, “Blocking Pitches: Assessing a Catcher’s Ability to Save Runs with Bruises”

2005

- Peter Morris, “Origin of the Pitching Rotation”

2004

- Andy McCue, “Rickey v. O’Malley and the Mysterious Buyout Clause”

2003

- Peter Morris, “The Origin of the Word ‘Fan’ “

2002

- Tom Tippett, “Using Lineup-dependent Expected Runs Analysis to Evaluate Strategies”

2001

- David W. Smith, “Play by Play Analysis of the 1951 National League Pennant Race”

2000

- Doug Pappas, “111 Years of Major League Ejections”

1999

- Jean Ardell, “Left-hander Ila Borders: Crossing Baseball’s Gender Line from Little League to the Northern League”

1998

- Stew Thornley, “The Polo Grounds — A Tale of Four Stadiums”

1997

- Norman Macht, “Baseball’s Traditional Values: What Are They?”

1996

- John Pastier, “A Dozen New Ballparks, 1989-2000”

1995

- Dennis & Jeanne DeValeria, “Honus Wagner’s Tricks of the Trade: At the Plate in the Field, On the Bases”

1994

- Tom Shieber, “The Evolution of the Pitcher’s Mound”

1993

- Barry Mednick, “The Giants Stay Put: For Now”

1992

- Jack Carlson, “Baseball Patents”

1991

- William Chambers, “Larry Doyle”

1990

- Bob Buege, “The Milwaukee Braves: A Baseball Eulogy”
