= Amy J. Schmitz =

American legal scholar

Amy J. Schmitz is an American legal scholar.

Schmitz graduated from Drake University and the University of Minnesota Law School. She taught at the University of Colorado Law School for sixteen years, then accepted an appointment as Elwood L. Thomas Missouri Endowed Professor of Law at the University of Missouri School of Law in 2016, before joining the Ohio State University Moritz College of Law as John Deaver Drinko-Baker & Hostetler Endowed Chair in Law. She is an elected member of the American Law Institute.
