= Irma McClaurin =

American poet, anthropologist, academic and leadership consultant

Irma P. McClaurin is an American poet, anthropologist, academic, and leadership consultant. She was the first female president of Shaw University, and is the author or editor of several books on topics including the culture of Belize, black feminism, African-American history, and her own poetry.

== Background ==
At a young age, McClaurin stored and saved some of her most personal stories and poems that she once wrote as a child. She was the first from her family to obtain a college degree. As an African American woman she has faced discrimination, and other forms of social injustice. Her study in anthropology research expanded as she started to gain a deeper understanding of her own African American culture, and the tribulations and social injustice they went through on a daily basis.

== Education and career ==
McClaurin is African-American, and grew up in Chicago. She majored in American Studies at Grinnell College, graduating in 1973, and earned a Master of Fine Arts in English in 1976 from the University of Massachusetts Amherst, as part of the first generation in her family to earn college degrees. As a full-time mother, she returned to the University of Massachusetts Amherst for additional graduate study, earning a Ph.D. in anthropology in 1993. She became a faculty member at the University of Florida, and also served as the editor of the journal Transforming Anthropology from 1996 to 2002.

After working as an administrator at Fisk University, she was named the Mott Distinguished Chair in Women's Studies at Bennett College in 2004, where she founded the Africana Women's Studies Program. She was a program officer at the Ford Foundation from 2005 to 2007. She founded the Urban Research and Outreach-Engagement Center at the University of Minnesota in 2007, and became its executive director. From 2010 to 2011 she was president of Shaw University, serving as its first female president and guiding the university through a year in which it suffered major damage from a tornado.

After stepping down from Shaw, she became a senior faculty member at the Federal Executive Institute and then the chief diversity officer of Teach For America.

In 2016, McClaurin created the Black Feminist Archive. The goal of these archives were to collect Black women's personal stories that made an impact, big or small accomplishments, and personal thoughts on the African American community. McClaurin wanted the Black Feminist Archive to make an impact across society, but most importantly to make a powerful statement that black women matter too. She came across many women stories that served a purpose, a purpose to view black women through a different lens.

== Work ==
In Women of Belize: Gender and Change in Central America (1996), McClaurin's ethnography research highlights important aspects of Belizean culture. The gender socialization, gender inequality, traditional practices, and the enculturation seen among women. The book includes some of the most personal, intimate stories of women's upbringing within the culture.

In Black Women: Visible and Heard, McClaurin establishes her goals toward the Black Feminist Archive. Her vision was to lead future students to reflect on some of the most historical, and impactful events that Black African women went through, following racial injustice, diversity, and how they were seen to society.

== Recognition ==
McClaurin won the Gwendolyn Brooks Literary Award for Poetry in 1975. In 2015, the Black Press of America named a column by McClaurin, "A Black mother weeps for America: Stop killing our Black sons!", as the best in the country for that year. In 2016, the University of Massachusetts Amherst recognized McClaurin as a distinguished alumna. In 2017, the National Women's Studies Association gave her a special award for "her contributions to the growth and vitality of NWSA" in her work at the Ford Foundation, where she oversaw grants that led to dramatic changes in the association.

In 2021, McClaurin explained her inspiration for creating the Black Feminist Archive with Eshe Lewis. Throughout the interview, she discussed the importance of making Black women be known for their contributions and hard work within the anthropology field. The stories of the African American community needed to be seen and heard, and not be overlooked.

== Books ==
McClaurin is the author or editor of:

- Black Chicago (Amuru Rannick Press, 1971)
- Song in the Night (Pearl Press, 1974)
- Pearl's Song: Poems (Lotus Press, 1988) ISBN 9780916418731
- Women of Belize: Gender and Change in Central America (Rutgers University Press, 1996) ISBN 9780813523088
- Black Feminist Anthropology: Theory, Politics, Praxis, and Poetics (edited, Rutgers University Press, 2001) ISBN 9780813529257
- The Civil Rights Movement (with Virginia Schomp, Drama of African-American History, Marshall Cavendish Benchmark, 2008) ISBN 9780761426424
- Facing the Future (with Virginia Schomp, Drama of African-American History, Marshall Cavendish Benchmark, 2008) ISBN 9780761426448
