= Jefferson B. Fordham =

Dean of University of Pennsylvania Law School

9th Dean of University of Pennsylvania Law School
- In office 1952–1970

10th Dean of Moritz College of Law
- In office 1947–1952
- Preceded by: Harry W. Vanneman
- Succeeded by: Frank R. Strong

Personal details
- Born: 1906 Greensboro, North Carolina, U.S.
- Died: June 28, 1994 (aged 88) Salt Lake City, Utah, U.S.
- Education: University of North Carolina (BA, MA); Yale Law School (JD)
- Occupation: Professor; Lawyer; Administrator

Jefferson B. Fordham (1906 – June 28, 1994) was the ninth Dean of the University of Pennsylvania Law School, and the tenth Dean of the Ohio State University Moritz College of Law.

== Education ==
Fordham was a Phi Beta Kappa graduate of the University of North Carolina, where he also earned his master's degree. He received a Juris Doctor degree from the Yale Law School in 1930, where he was a member of the Order of the Coif.

== Legal career ==
Fordham began his legal career working in Government service in Washington, DC and private practice in New York, New York in the 1930s. He then served in the Pacific as a lieutenant commander in the Navy in World War II. After returning from the war theater, Fordham entered academic working as a professor of law at the Louisiana State University Paul M. Hebert Law Center and Vanderbilt University Law School. In 1947, Fordham became the tenth Dean of the Ohio State University Moritz College of Law. He was elected Chair of the American Bar Association's Section of State and Local Government Law in 1949. He then served as ninth Dean of the University of Pennsylvania Law School from 1952 until he reached emeritus status in 1970. Roberts Hall, Pepper Hall and the law school dormitories were built during his tenure as Dean. From 1972 to 1993, Fordham was a professor of law at the University of Utah S.J. Quinney College of Law.

In 1974, Martin Meyerson, president of the University and Bernard Wolfman, dean of the University of Pennsylvania Law School, announced that the Jefferson B. Fordham Professorship of Law had been created at the Law School in honor of Fordham.

== Scholarly work ==
Fordham was an expert on constitutional and municipal law.

Academic offices
Preceded by Arthur T. Martin	Dean of Moritz College of Law; 1947-1952	Succeeded by Frank R. Strong
Preceded by Owen J. Roberts	Dean of the University of Pennsylvania Law School; 1952-1969	Succeeded by Bernard Wolfman
