= Nancy H. Rogers =

American lawyer and politician (born 1948)

Nancy Hardin Rogers
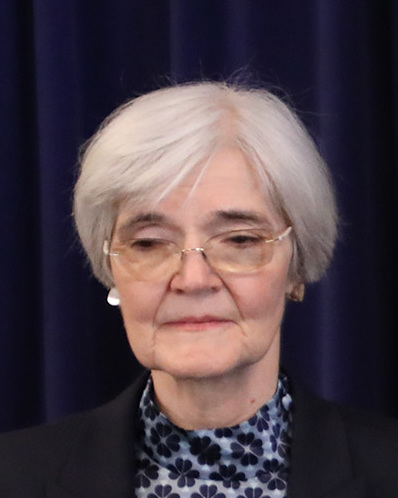
- Rogers in 2019

48th Attorney General of Ohio
- In office May 28, 2008 – January 8, 2009
- Governor: Ted Strickland
- Preceded by: Marc Dann
- Succeeded by: Richard Cordray

18th Dean of Moritz College of Law
- In office 2001–2008
- Preceded by: Gregory H. Williams
- Succeeded by: Alan C. Michaels

Personal details
- Born: September 18, 1948 (age 78)
- Spouse: Douglas Rogers
- Parent: Clifford M. Hardin (father)
- Education: University of Kansas (BA); Yale University (JD)
- Occupation: Professor; Lawyer; Administrator
- Website: Nancy H. Rogers

Nancy Hardin Rogers (born September 18, 1948) is an American lawyer, author, and former Attorney General of Ohio, a former Dean of the Ohio State University Moritz College of Law and the former holder of the Michael E. Moritz Chair in Alternative Dispute Resolution at the Moritz College of Law. She is currently a professor emeritus.

== Education ==
Rogers was the daughter of Clifford M. Hardin, Secretary of Agriculture in the Nixon Administration. She married Douglas Rogers, son of William P. Rogers, Nixon's Secretary of State in 1970.

Rogers received her B.A. with highest distinction from the University of Kansas in 1969 and her J.D. from Yale Law School in 1972.

== Career ==
Rogers clerked for U.S. District Judge Thomas D. Lambros in Cleveland and worked at the Cleveland Legal Aid Society.

Rogers joined the faculty of the Ohio State University College of Law in 1975. She focused her studies on alternative dispute resolution, publishing a large number of journal articles and books, and she helped found the Ohio State Journal on Dispute Resolution, which is an official publication of the American Bar Association.

On January 6, 2007, Rogers became the President of the Association of American Law Schools. Rogers was also a member of the Ohio Supreme Court Advisory Committee on Dispute Resolution since its inception in 1989, until 2005.

On May 28, 2008, Governor Ted Strickland named Rogers as Attorney General, replacing Marc Dann. Rogers did not seek the position when it was up for reelection in November 2008 and returned to the Moritz faculty following the election.

== Books ==
- Rogers, Nancy H.; Goldberg, Stephen B.; Sander, Frank E.A.; Cole, Sarah R. (2003). Dispute Resolution: Negotiation, Mediation, and Other Processes (4th ed.). New York City: Aspen Publishing. ISBN 0-7355-2910-8.

== See also ==
- List of female state attorneys general in the United States

Legal offices
| Preceded by Marc Dann | Attorney General of Ohio; 2008-2009 | Succeeded by Richard Cordray |
Academic offices
| Preceded by Gregory H. Williams | Dean of Moritz College of Law; 2001-2007 | Succeeded by Alan C. Michaels |
