= Bernard W. Harleston =

Dr. Bernard Warren Harleston

13th President of Lincoln University (acting)
- In office 1968–1970
- Preceded by: Marvin Wachman
- Succeeded by: Herman Russell Branson

Dean of Tufts University
- In office 1970–1981

9th President of City College of New York
- In office 1981–1992
- Preceded by: Robert Marshak
- Succeeded by: Yolanda T. Moses

Bernard Warren Harleston (born January 22, 1930) is a former college administrator who was selected in 1981 as the first African-American president of City College of New York. Harleston was born in New York City and raised in Hempstead. He received his bachelor's degree at Howard University in 1951 and his psychology doctorate at University of Rochester in 1955. A year after receiving his doctorate, he was appointed as an assistant professor of psychology at Tufts University, working there for the next 35 years and rising to the position of dean in 1970. From 1968 to 1970, he briefly served as provost and acting president of Lincoln University.

In 1981, Harleston was selected as president of City College of New York, beating out finalists Shirley Chisholm and Homer Neal. During his administration of the college, the policy of open admissions resulted in its status as having an engineering school with the largest number of black and Hispanic students. At the same time, the reputation of the college declined in this period. The school was also disrupted by student takeovers of facilities in 1989 and 1991, an incident where nine students were crushed to death in the gymnasium stairwell outside a celebrity basketball game, and racially divisive statements issued by professors Leonard Jeffries against white people and Michael Levin against black people, homosexuals and feminists. Amid the uproar of such controversies, Harleston resigned, seeking a more tranquil campus scene.
