= L. Camille Hébert =

American legal scholar (born 1959)

L. Camille Hébert (born 1959) is an American legal academic.

Hébert earned a Bachelor of Arts in philosophy and political science at Kansas State University in 1979, then attended the University of Kansas School of Law, graduating in 1982 with her Juris Doctor. She clerked for James Kenneth Logan before practicing labor and employment law with Spencer, Fane, Britt, and Browne, a law firm in Kansas City, Missouri, as an advocate for management.

Hébert joined the Ohio State University faculty in 1988, and held the Carter C. Kissell Professorship of Law at the Moritz College of Law. She served as acting dean of Moritz in 2024, between the tenures of Lincoln Davies and Kent Barnett. At the time of her appointment as acting dean, she held the Robert J. Lynn Chair in Law.
