= Joshua Dressler =

American law professor

- Citizenship: American
- Education: UCLA (B.A.); UCLA School of Law (J.D.)
- Occupation: Author; Legal scholar, professor of law

Joshua Dressler is an American retired law professor. He is a Distinguished University Professor Emeritus at the Ohio State University. He has held academic positions at several U.S. law schools and is widely recognized for his scholarship, teaching, and contributions to legal education. His work has focused on areas such as criminal responsibility, sentencing, and moral theory, with particular attention to issues involving battered women and self-defense law.

== Early life and education ==
Dressler attended UCLA, earning his B.A. in 1968, and then earned his J.D. from the UCLA School of Law in 1973.

== Career ==
Dressler began his academic career at Hamline University School of Law. where he served as an associate professor and later as professor of law. He subsequently joined Wayne State University Law School, where he served as professor of law and held the Career Development Chair. While at Wayne State, he was awarded the Donald H. Gordon Teaching Excellence Award (1990).

Dressler then taught at the Ohio State University Moritz College of Law, beginning his tenure at OSU in 2001. He was also a visiting professor at various institutions across the United States, as well as internationally at the University of British Columbia and University of Auckland in New Zealand. In 2005, he was named a Distinguished University Lecturer. In a 2014 article about his nomination for Distinguished University Professor Emeritus, the university wrote that Dressler "is, without exaggeration and by nearly any accepted standard, the country's leading academic authority in the field of criminal law — and among the leaders in criminal procedure".

Dressler is the editor-in-chief of the Encyclopedia of Crime and Justice and is credited for helping create the Ohio State Journal of Criminal Law; he serves as the co-editor of the latter. His research included the topic of battered women who kill their abusers. On articles regarding legal matters, Dressler's expertise in criminal law has been cited by various media outlets including Vox, Mother Jones, the Boston Review, and the New York Times.

In 1993, Dressler joined the McGeorge School of Law, where he later held the institution’s first Distinguished Professor and Scholar Chair. During this period, he continued to develop his national reputation as a scholar in criminal law and criminal procedure and received the Eberhardt Teacher and Scholar Award (1995). His teaching and scholarship at McGeorge contributed to his growing recognition as a leading academic in his field. Dressler is known for his extensive contributions to legal scholarship. He has authored or co-authored casebooks and treatises widely used in legal education, particularly in criminal law and criminal procedure.

== Awards and Recognition ==
Dressler has received numerous teaching and scholarly awards, including:

- University Distinguished Scholar (2007) – Ohio State University
- University Distinguished Lecturer (2005) – Ohio State University
- Eberhardt Teacher and Scholar Award (1995) – McGeorge School of Law
- Donald H. Gordon Teaching Excellence Award (1990) – Wayne State University
- “Best Professor” Award (1981) – Hamline University
- Adjunct/Visiting Faculty Professor of the Year (2018) – University of Nevada, Las Vegas

== Published works ==
Books

- Understanding Criminal Law (1987)
- Criminal Procedure: Principles, Policies, and Perspectives
- Cases and Materials on Criminal Law (1994)
- The Law of Criminal Investigations: A College Casebook (2019)
- Criminal Procedure: Investigating Crime (multiple editions)
- Criminal Procedure: Prosecuting Crime (multiple editions)
- Cases and Materials on Criminal Law (1994–2025; with Steven Garvey from 6th ed.)
- Understanding Criminal Procedure (1991–2021)
- Encyclopedia of Crime and Justice (Editor-in-Chief, 2002 revised edition)

Articles

- "Professor Delgado's 'Brainwashing' Defense: Courting a Determinist Legal System" (1979). in Minnesota Law Review. 1711.
- "Battered Women, Self-Defense, and the Law" (2011). in Fordham Law Review (with Holly Maguigan)
- “Kahler v. Kansas: Ask the Wrong Question, Get the Wrong Answer” (Ohio State Journal of Criminal Law, 2020)
- “Reflections on the Warren Court’s Criminal Justice Legacy” (University of the Pacific Law Review, 2020)
- “Miranda v. Arizona: Be Grateful for Small Favors” (Texas Tech Law Review, 2017)
- “Rethinking Criminal Homicide Statutes” (Texas Tech Law Review, 2014)
- “Duress” in Handbook on the Philosophy of Criminal Law (2011)
- “Feminist Reform of Self-Defense Law” (Marquette Law Review, 2010)
- “Reforming Complicity Law” (Ohio State Journal of Criminal Law, 2008)
- “The Model Penal Code: Like a Classic Movie in Need of a Remake?” (Ohio State Journal of Criminal Law, 2003)
- “Why Keep the Provocation Defense?” (Minnesota Law Review, 2002)
- “Hating Criminals: How Can Something that Feels So Good Be Wrong?” (Michigan Law Review, 1990)
