= Alan C. Michaels =

American lawyer

19th Dean of Moritz College of Law
- In office November 1, 2008 – June 30, 2019
- Preceded by: Nancy H. Rogers
- Succeeded by: Lincoln L. Davies

Personal details
- Education: Harvard University (BA); Columbia University (JD)
- Occupation: Professor; Lawyer; Administrator
- Website: Alan C. Michaels

Alan C. Michaels was the nineteenth Dean and Edwin M. Cooperman Chair in Law at the Ohio State University Moritz College of Law. Michaels was a law clerk to Associate Justice Harry A. Blackmun of the United States Supreme Court in 1987.

== Education ==
Michaels graduated from Harvard College magna cum laude with a bachelor's degree in social sciences in 1983. He then received his J.D. degree from the Columbia Law School in 1986, where he was the notes and comments editor for the Columbia Law Review.

== Legal career ==
Michaels began his legal career as a clerk for Chief Judge Wilfred Feinberg of the United States Court of Appeals for the Second Circuit in 1986, and then Associate Justice Harry A. Blackmun of the United States Supreme Court in 1987. Between 1988 and 1991, Michaels worked at McGuire & Tiernan in New York City, where he was outside counsel to the Major League Baseball Players Association. Michaels then served as an assistant district attorney in the New York County District Attorney’s Office as a member of the Career Criminal Bureau from 1991 to 1995.

Michaels entered academia in 1995 when he joined the faculty of the Moritz College of Law. Since joining Moritz, Michaels was twice presented the College’s Outstanding Professor Award as voted by the graduating classes of 2000 and 1999. In 2007, Michaels was given the university’s Alumni Award for Distinguished Teaching. In November 2008, the Ohio State University Board of Trustees named Michaels the nineteenth Dean of the Moritz College of Law. He remained in this position for 11 years, ably steering Moritz through a period of upheaval in the national legal job market and hence declining admissions to law school. At the time he stepped down as dean, Moritz had risen to a national ranking of #34 by U.S. News & World Report.

== Scholarly work ==
Michaels scholarly work focuses on criminal law and sports law. He is coauthor with Professor Joshua Dressler of Understanding Criminal Procedure (4th edition) and serves as co-managing editor of the Ohio State Journal of Criminal Law. He also was the recipient of the 1998-99 Outstanding Scholarly Paper Award from the Association of American Law Schools.

== See also ==
- List of law clerks for the second seat of the Supreme Court of the United States

Academic offices
Preceded by Nancy H. Rogers	Dean of Moritz College of Law; 2008–present	Incumbent
