= James C. Kirby =

13th Dean of Moritz College of Law
- In office 1970–1974
- Preceded by: Ivan C. Rutledge
- Succeeded by: L. Orin Slagle

Personal details
- Born: Lafayette, Tennessee
- Died: 1989
- Education: Vanderbilt University (B.A.); New York University (J.D.)
- Occupation: Professor; Lawyer; Administrator

James C. Kirby was the thirteenth dean of the Ohio State University Moritz College of Law.

== Education ==
Kirby earned his bachelor's degree in political science with honors from Vanderbilt University in 1950. He then received his J.D. degree from the New York University School of Law in 1954, where he was a Root-Tilden Scholar.

== Legal career ==
Kirby begin his legal career working in private practice from 1954 to 1961. He then became chief counsel to the United States Senate Judiciary Subcommittee on the Constitution, serving from 1961 to 1963. Kirby entered academia in 1962, and worked as a professor of law at the Vanderbilt University Law School from 1962 to 1965, Northwestern University Pritzker School of Law from 1965 to 1968, and the New York University School of Law from 1968 to 1970. Kirby was next appointed the thirteenth dean of the Ohio State University Moritz College of Law, serving from 1970 to 1974. He then served as vice president, general counsel and secretary of New York University from 1974 to 1979. Finally, Kirby was a member of the faculty at the University of Tennessee College of Law, where he served as acting dean in 1980 and 1981, and retired in 1988.

== Scholarly work ==
Kirby scholarly work focused on legal ethics. He helped write the Twenty-fifth Amendment to the United States Constitution on presidential and vice presidential vacancies, disability, and succession.

Academic offices
Preceded by Ivan C. Rutledge	Dean of Moritz College of Law; 1970-1974	Succeeded by L. Orin Slagle
