= Larry Garvin =

Larry T. Garvin (born 1962) is an American legal scholar.

== Education ==
Garvin earned a Bachelor of Arts in history, as well as a Bachelor of Science in physiology and biochemistry, both from Michigan State University in 1983. He completed a Master of Science in neuroscience at the University of Michigan in 1986, and obtained his Juris Doctor in 1989, at Yale Law School. Garvin holds the Lawrence D. Stanley Professorship at the Ohio State University Moritz College of Law.

== Legal career ==
He served on the Uniform Law Commission, and in 2024, was appointed vice chairman of its Study Committee on Mental Privacy, Cognitive Biometrics, and Neural Data.

Garvin is an elected member of the American Law Institute.
