= Sarah Rudolph Cole =

Sarah Rudolph Cole is an American legal scholar.

While Cole attended college, she won five NCAA Division II swimming championships. She graduated from the University of Puget Sound in 1986 with a Bachelor of Arts in American history, then earned her J.D. from the University of Chicago Law School in 1990. Cole then clerked for Eugene Allen Wright. She holds the Michael E. Moritz Chair in Alternative Dispute Resolution at the Ohio State University Moritz College of Law.

Cole is an elected member of the American Law Institute.
