= Ronald M. Gould =

American judge (born 1946)

Ronald Gould
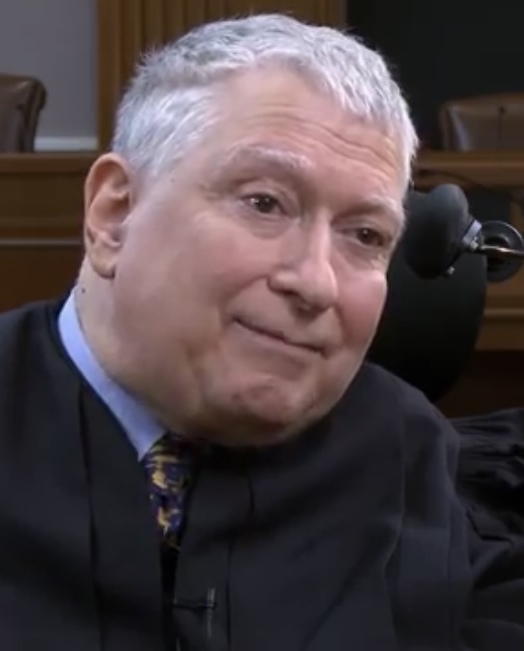
- Gould in 2013

Judge of the United States Court of Appeals for the Ninth Circuit
- Incumbent
- Assumed office November 22, 1999
- Appointed by: Bill Clinton
- Preceded by: Robert Beezer

Personal details
- Born: Ronald Murray Gould; 1946 (age 79–80) St. Louis, Missouri, U.S.
- Party: Democratic
- Education: University of Pennsylvania (BS); University of Michigan (JD)

Ronald Murray Gould (born in 1946) is an American lawyer and jurist serving as a U.S. circuit judge of the U.S. Court of Appeals for the Ninth Circuit since 1999.

== Education ==
Gould was born in 1946 in St. Louis, Missouri. He graduated from the University of Pennsylvania with a Bachelor of Science. He attended the University of Michigan Law School, graduating in 1973 with a Juris Doctor.

== Legal career ==
After graduating from law school, Gould clerked for Judge Wade H. McCree of the United States Court of Appeals for the Sixth Circuit from 1973 to 1974 and for Justice Potter Stewart of the U.S. Supreme Court from 1974 to 1975. Gould was in private practice for Perkins Coie in Seattle, Washington from 1975 to 1999 and served as an adjunct professor at the University of Washington Law School from 1986 to 1989. He was a partner at Perkins Coie at the time of his appeals court nomination. He also was president of the Washington State Bar Association.

== Federal judicial service ==
Gould was nominated by President Bill Clinton for a seat vacated by Judge Robert Beezer of the United States Court of Appeals for the Ninth Circuit on January 26, 1999. He was confirmed by the United States Senate on November 17, 1999, in a voice vote and received his commission on November 22, 1999.

== Notable cases ==
On July 13, 2013, Gould dissented from a denial of en banc rehearing when the Ninth Circuit upheld a ban on Greenpeace's protest against shell drilling. Gould, who was joined by Pregerson, Reinhardt, Wardlaw, Fletcher, and Milan Smith, saw this as a violation of First Amendment rights, writing "The panel majority's contrary conclusion will undermine the freedom of an organization to "stimulate [its] audience with spontaneous and emotional appeals for unity and action in a common cause.""

On August 23, 2019, Gould was one of three judges to rule that a prisoner with gender dysphoria had a right to sex reassignment surgery under the Eighth Amendment. Judge Margaret McKeown and district judge Robert Lasnik, sitting by designation, joined the opinion. The full Ninth Circuit refused to rehear the case en banc, although eight judges, all Republican appointees, dissented from the denial of rehearing.

On September 18, 2019, Gould dissented from a 9th circuit ruling holding that the government could not exert its state secrets privilege over a pair of subpoenas. The Supreme Court reversed the 9th circuit in United States v. Zubaydah, affirming Gould's position.

On September 6, 2022, Gould wrote the 9th Circuit decision upholding Washington's ban on conversion therapy for minors. The Supreme Court denied certiorari on December 11, 2023.

On October 30, 2023, Gould revived a lawsuit over an Arizona abortion law banning abortions of fetuses with "fetal abnormalities". Although Roe v. Wade has been overturned, the healthcare providers' lawsuit focused on both the vagueness of the law (forcing them to err on the side of not providing abortions) and economic loss from not being able to perform abortions.

On November 13, 2023, Gould was in a 7-4 majority that temporarily blocked Idaho's abortion ban due to its lack of exceptions for medical emergencies. On January 5, 2024, the Supreme Court said it would take up the case and dissolved the 9th circuit's temporary injunction. Then, in June 2024, the Supreme Court reinstated the 9th circuit's injunction in Moyle v. United States.

On February 25, 2025, Gould (joined by Wardlaw) struck down two proof-of-citizenship laws in Arizona. One would have prohibited voters who don't prove citizenship from voting for president, and the other would have prohibited them from voting by mail.

On July 23, 2025, Gould issued a nationwide injunction blocking Trump's executive order that sought to end birthright citizenship for various people.

On August 1, 2025, Gould ruled that ICE cannot detain people based on their race, language, accent, occupation, or location.

== Personal life ==
While still in private practice, Gould was diagnosed with multiple sclerosis. During his time on the bench, he lost the use of his arms and legs; he now relies on a wheelchair for mobility, and with the aid of other technologies and of assistants and clerks is able to "get a good result in the work I'm doing." Gould is Jewish.

== See also ==
- List of Jewish American jurists
- List of law clerks for the eighth seat of the Supreme Court of the United States
- Profile on CBS Sunday Morning July 19, 2026

Legal offices
Preceded by Robert Beezer	Judge of the United States Court of Appeals for the Ninth Circuit; 1999–present	Incumbent
