= Alexander Joel (official) =

Alex Joel
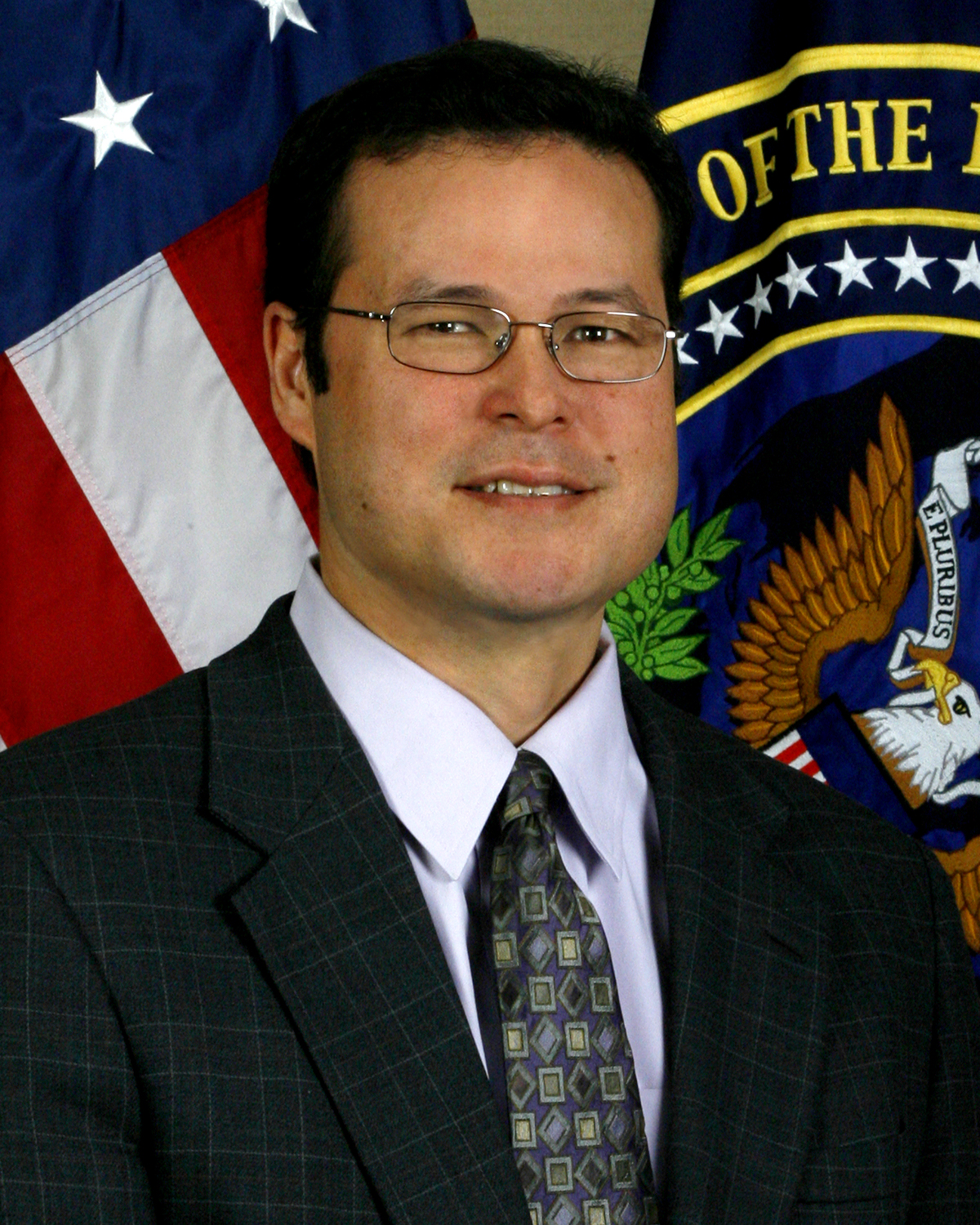

Civil Liberties Protection Officer for the U.S. Office of the Director of National Intelligence
- Incumbent
- Assumed office December 7, 2005

Alexander W. Joel is the first Civil Liberties Protection Officer for the U.S. Office of the Director of National Intelligence. He was appointed to the position by Director John Negroponte on December 7, 2005.

== Biography ==
Joel entered public service following the events of September 11. He joined the Central Intelligence Agency's Office of General Counsel in October 2002, where he provided legal advice relating to intelligence activities. Prior to his employment by the CIA, Mr. Joel served as the privacy, technology, and e-commerce attorney for Marriott International, Inc., where he helped engineer and deploy Marriott's global privacy compliance program, including the creation of their first privacy officer position. Before that, he worked as a technology attorney at the law firm of Shaw, Pittman, Potts & Trowbridge in Washington, D.C. (now Pillsbury Winthrop Shaw Pittman), and for four years as a U.S. Army Judge Advocate General Corps officer, as both prosecutor and defense attorney.

== Education ==
Mr. Joel received his B.A. degree from Princeton University in 1984, magna cum laude. He received his law degree from the University of Michigan in 1987, magna cum laude, where he was a member of the Michigan Law Review.
