= Eugene Allen Wright =

American judge (1913–2002)

Senior Judge of the United States Court of Appeals for the Ninth Circuit
- In office September 15, 1983 – September 3, 2002

Judge of the United States Court of Appeals for the Ninth Circuit
- In office September 15, 1969 – September 15, 1983
- Appointed by: Richard Nixon
- Preceded by: Seat established by 82 Stat. 184
- Succeeded by: Robert Beezer

Personal details
- Born: Eugene Allen Wright; February 23, 1913 Seattle, Washington
- Died: September 3, 2002 (aged 89) Seattle, Washington
- Education: University of Washington (AB); University of Washington School of Law (JD)

Eugene Allen Wright (February 23, 1913 – September 3, 2002) was a United States circuit judge of the United States Court of Appeals for the Ninth Circuit.

== Education and career ==
Born in Seattle, Washington, Wright received an Artium Baccalaureus degree from the University of Washington in 1934 and a Juris Doctor from the University of Washington School of Law in 1937. He was in the United States Army Reserve as a colonel from 1934 to 1965. He was in active service from 1941 to 1946. He was in private practice in Seattle from 1937 to 1941 and from 1946 to 1954. He was a judge pro tem of the Municipal Court in Seattle from 1948 to 1952. He was a lecturer at the University of Washington School of Law from 1952 to 1974. He was a judge of the King County Superior Court in King County from 1954 to 1966. He was a lecturer at the University of Washington School of Communications from 1965 to 1966. He was a vice president and senior trust officer for the Pacific National Bank of Seattle from 1966 to 1969.

== Federal judicial service ==
Wright was nominated by President Richard Nixon on June 23, 1969, to the United States Court of Appeals for the Ninth Circuit, to a new seat created by 82 Stat. 184. He was confirmed by the United States Senate on September 12, 1969, and received his commission on September 15, 1969. He assumed senior status on September 15, 1983. Wright served in that capacity until his death on September 3, 2002, in Seattle.

== Sources ==
Legal offices
Preceded by Seat established by 82 Stat. 184	Judge of the United States Court of Appeals for the Ninth Circuit; 1969–1983	Succeeded by Robert Beezer
