= Joshua Morse =

American legal scholar

Joshua Morse was an American Professor Emeritus at Florida State University in Tallahassee, Florida. Professor Morse's formal name is Joshua M. Morse, III. He was the Dean of Florida State University College of Law from 1969 to 1980. He also served as a professor in the College of Law, 1969 to 1998.

Professor Morse earned his JD in 1948 at the University of Mississippi. In 1964, he earned distinction as a "Sterling Fellow" from Yale Law School.

Professor Morse also was Dean of the University of Mississippi School of Law, 1962–1969. In 1969, while Dean at Ole Miss, Time Magazine reported Morse was "eased out" for showing the same "liberal" traits as his predecessor. Joshua Morse departed Ole Miss to serve as Dean at FSU's law school.

== Sources ==
- Exploring FSU's Past: A Public History Project, Fall 2006
- Joshua Morse III, Law School Dean Who Defied Segregation, Dies at 89
