= Gregory H. Williams =

American scholar (1943–2025)

28th President of University of Cincinnati
- In office 2009–2012
- Preceded by: Nancy L. Zimpher
- Succeeded by: Santa Ono

11th President of the City College of the City University of New York
- In office 2001–2009
- Preceded by: Stanford A. Roman Jr., interim; Yolanda T. Moses, President
- Succeeded by: Robert "Buzz" Paaswell, interim; Lisa Staiano-Coico, President

17th Dean of Moritz College of Law
- In office 1993–2001
- Preceded by: Francis X. Beytagh
- Succeeded by: Nancy H. Rogers

Personal details
- Born: Gregory Howard Williams; November 12, 1943 Muncie, Indiana, U.S.
- Died: August 12, 2025 (aged 81) Valhalla, New York, U.S.
- Education: George Washington University

Gregory Howard Williams (November 12, 1943 – August 12, 2025) was an American scholar, attorney, law school academic and author who was the 27th President of the University of Cincinnati (2009 to 2012) and the 11th President of the City College of New York (2001–2009).

== Early life and education ==
Gregory Howard Williams was born on November 12, 1943, in Muncie, Indiana. He was the son of James Anthony, a businessman, and Mary, a homemaker. He grew up in Gum Springs, Virginia, until his parents separated, and his father lost his business. At the age of 10, Williams and his brother moved to Muncie, Indiana, where his father had family, and he first became aware of his father's African American heritage. Despite a period of confusion about his own identity, Williams embraced his father's passion for education.

Williams earned a Bachelor of Arts degree from Ball State University in 1966, where he paid tuition by earning money as a deputy sheriff in the Delaware County Sheriff's Department in Muncie, Indiana, from 1963 to 1966. Between 1966 and 1970, Williams taught classes in Virginia state government and history at George Mason Junior-Senior High School in Falls Church, Virginia. In 1969, he earned a master's degree in government and politics from the University of Maryland. Williams earned a J.D. from George Washington University in 1971. From 1971 to 1973, he was a legislative assistant to Senator Vance Hartke (D-Indiana) of the United States Senate, Washington, D.C. In 1977, he earned a master's degree in political science, and in 1982, a doctorate in political science, both from George Washington University with a thesis "Legal and political problems of police discretion". He also earned an MBA from Mercy College (New York).

== Career ==
In 1977, Williams joined the University of Iowa Law faculty, where he taught criminal law, criminal procedure, and legislation. Williams was faculty scholar from 1990 to 1993. At Iowa, Williams served as associate dean of the Law School, from 1977 to 1993, where he oversaw admissions, financial aid, student and faculty recruitment, and student support, and he served as associate vice president of academic affairs from 1991 to 1993.

From 1975 to 1977, he consulted to the Foreign Lawyer Training Program in Washington, DC. He was a member of the Iowa State Advisory Commission to the United States Civil Rights Commission from 1978 to 1988, and a member of the Iowa Law Enforcement Academy Council from 1979 to 1985.

Williams was appointed visiting professor on faculty of law at Durham University, Durham, England, from 1984 to 1986, and visiting scholar at Selwyn College at Cambridge University, Cambridge, England, from 1986 to 1987.

From 1991 to 1993, he held the position of associate vice-president for Academic Affairs at the University of Iowa in Iowa City, Iowa. From 1993 to 2001, Williams held the positions of Carter Kissell Professor of Law and dean of the Michael E. Moritz College of Law at Ohio State University. While dean, the size of the faculty increased by 40 percent, the number of named chairs and professorships doubled, and $25 million was raised from alumni of approximately 7,000 graduates.

=== College presidencies ===
In 2001, Williams was appointed the 11th president of the City College of New York – the flagship campus of the City University of New York system. His appointment followed his tenure as a law school dean at Ohio State since 1993, where Williams taught courses in criminal law, he raised $25 million and oversaw the increase of the school's endowment by about 50 percent. During his tenure at Ohio State, Williams also served as the president of the Association of American Law Schools and his autobiographical book, Life on the Color Line: The True Story of a White Boy Who Discovered He Was Black, (Dutton, 1995) won the 1995 Los Angeles Times Book Award.

Under Williams' presidency of the City College of New York, enrollment increased by 60 percent and academic standards improved significantly; nearly 90 percent of the student body continue to represent racial minority groups. Williams successfully oversaw the first capital campaign at City College, raising more than $230 million and effectively establishing a culture of philanthropy, and more than doubled City College's research funding.

During his tenure as president of the City College of New York, Williams served as chair of the Commission on Access, Diversity, and Excellence (CADE) of the Association of Public and Land-grant Universities. Williams moderated and presented at the 2001 Association of American Law Schools annual meeting. Upon his departure in September 2009, Williams left behind a City University of New York campus in Harlem, New York, where more than one-third of the students are Hispanic, and nearly 30-percent are African or African American, and half are born outside of the United States of America. In total, ninety languages are spoken on campus.

Williams began his tenure as president of the University of Cincinnati on November 1, 2009. During Williams' first year in the office of president, he launched a strategic plan, UC2019 – Accelerating Our Transformation, which took its name from the university's upcoming bicentennial year. During his presidency at the University of Cincinnati, enrollment reached a historic level; the university established a new health system. In 2012, Williams resigned from the position of president, citing personal reasons. That same year, Williams chaired the search for a new commissioner of the Big East Conference.

=== Professional recognition ===
Williams has been recognized for his contributions in scholarship, academic leadership, and fundraising. In 1998, President Bill Clinton invited Williams to join the United States President's Call to Action to promote diversity and pro bono legal services. The following year, Williams was selected by the National Association of Public Interest Law (NAPIL) as Dean of the Year. That same year, the National Bar Association awarded Williams the A. Leon Higginbotham Jr. Award for Contributions to the Preservation of Human and Civil Rights.

Notably, he received the National Bar Association's A. Leon Higginbotham Jr. Award for Outstanding Contributions to the Preservation of Human and Civil Rights (1999); Governor's Tribute to African-American Leaders of Excellence in State Service (2004) from New York Governor George Pataki; Austrian Decoration for Science and Art in the Division of for Science and Art, Vienna, Austria (2006); Proclamation of Dr. Gregory Howard Williams Day and Honorary Mayor-President by Mayor Kip Holden of Baton Rouge, Louisiana (2006); Key to the City from Mayor Daniel Canan of Muncie, Indiana (2006); Langston Hughes Award from The City College of New York for contributions to the Arts and Letters (2009); Bridges for a Just Community Distinguished Service Citation (2012); and George Washington University Law School Distinguished Alumni Achievement Award (2015). Williams is also honored by the Gregory H. Williams Chair in Civil Rights & Civil Liberties of the Moritz College of Law at Ohio State University.

Williams also received honorary doctorate degrees from the California Western School of Law (1997), Ball State University (1999), College of Wooster (2000), New York Law School (2009), Skidmore College (2010), and Columbia University (2016).

== Personal life and death ==
Williams married Sara Catherine Whitney on August 29, 1969. Their children are Natalia Dora, Zachary Benjamin, Anthony Bîadîmir, Carlos Gregory. He died on August 12, 2025, at the age of 81.

== Corporate and public boards ==
- Independent Trustee, Franklin Templeton, Franklin Managed Trust and Value Investors Trust, San Mateo, California, 2008-
- Finance Committee, Nominations Committee, Independent Director, Urban America Fund II, 2005 -
- Chair, Iowa Law Enforcement Academy Council, 1982–83, 1985, Vice-chairperson, 1981–82,1984–85; Member, 1980–85, appointed by the Governor of Iowa for two terms, and confirmed by Iowa State Senate
- Chair, Iowa Advisory Committee to the United States Commission on Civil Rights, 1983–1985; Member 1978-1988

== Publications ==
Williams published autobiography, Life on the Color Line: The True Story of a White Boy Who Discovered He Was Black, was awarded the 1995 Los Angeles Times Book of the Year. The term the color line, a reference to racial segregation, was famously used in an article "The Color Line" by Frederick Douglass, published in the North American Review (NAR) in 1881, and repeated by W. E. B. Du Bois, in his book The Souls of Black Folk, in 1903.

Williams' book is a reflection on his life growing up as the son of a white mother and a father who passed for white and identified himself as Italian American. At 10-years-old, Williams moved from his home in Virginia to Indiana, where he learned his father was African-American.

Williams' book Life on the Color Line was awarded the Outstanding Book on the Subject of Human Rights in North America by the Gustavus Myers Center for Human Rights. Williams has been a featured author on Dateline NBC, Larry King Live, The Oprah Winfrey Show, Nightline, NPR, and public lectures. His book has been cited in academic journals and syllabus.

=== Books ===
- Williams, G. H. (1995, 1999, 2014). Life On The color line: The true story of a white boy who discovered he was black. New York, N.Y: Dutton.
- Williams, G. H. (1986). The Iowa guide to search and seizure. Iowa City: University of Iowa.
- Williams, G. H. (1984). The law and politics of police discretion. Westport, Connecticut: Greenwood Press.

=== Articles and other contributory publications ===
- Williams, Gregory H. (1998) "Transforming the Powerless to the Powerful: the public responsibility of law school." 1, New Mexico Law Review Journal, 28, 17 pages.
- Williams, Gregory H. (1993) "Controlling the Use of Non-Deadly Force: Policy and Practice," 10 Harvard Black Letter Journal 79, 25 pages.
- Williams, Gregory H. (1992) "Teaching Criminal Law: 'Objectivity' in Black and White," 9 Harvard Blackletter Journal 27, 16 pages.
- Williams, Gregory H. (1991) "The Supreme Court and Broken Promises: The Gradual but Continual Erosion of Terry v. Ohio," Criminal Justice Symposium, 34 Howard Law Journal 567, 22 pages.
- Williams, Gregory H. (1990) "America's Drug Policy: Who are the Addicts?" 75 Iowa Law Review 1119, 15 pages.
- Williams, Gregory H. (1990) "Good Government by Prosecutorial Decree: The Use and Abuse of Mail Fraud," 32 Arizona Law Review. 1, 35 pages.
- Williams, Gregory H. (1989) "Police Discretion: A Comparative Perspective." 64 Indiana Law Journal 873, 33 pages.
- Williams, Gregory H. (1987) "Where is Freedom: Federal or State Constitutions?" 30 Howard Law Journal 799, 7 pages.
- Williams, Gregory H. (1989) "Police in the Dock: Law or Fact?" Criminal Law Review 719, 7 pages.
- Williams, Gregory H., et al. (1986). Discrecin̤, justicia y democracia: Una perspectiva de la polt̕ica pb︢lica. Mex̌ico: Noema.
- Williams, Gregory H. (1984) "Police Rulemaking Revisited: Some New Thoughts on an Old Problem." 47 Law and Contemporary Problems 123, 61 pages.
- Williams, Gregory H. (1984) "Use of Citations in Lieu of Custodial Arrest." Report of the Iowa Law Enforcement Academy Council to the Iowa General Assembly.
- Williams, Gregory H. (1983) "Police Discretion: The Institutional Dilemma--Who Is In Charge?" 68 Iowa Law Review 431, 63 pages.

=== Video ===
- Williams, G. H., Brown, T., Smith, K., & Ashby, W. (2006). The man who is black and white—not half white. New York: Tony Brown Productions Inc.

Academic offices
Preceded by Nancy Zimpher	President of University of Cincinnati; 2009–2012	Succeeded by Santa J. Ono
Preceded by Yolanda T. Moses	President of City College of New York; 2001–2009	Succeeded by Robert "Buzz" Paaswell, (interim)
Preceded by Francis X. Beytagh	Dean of Moritz College of Law; 1993–2001	Succeeded by Nancy H. Rogers
