= Margaret Kwoka =

Margaret Kwoka is an American legal scholar.

Kwoka obtained her Bachelor of Arts at Brown University, and her Juris Doctor at the Northeastern University School of Law. Kwoka clerked for Michael R. Murphy and Phillip Rapoza before working for the Public Citizen Litigation Group. Kwoka began her teaching career at the University of Denver's Sturm College of Law, before joining the Ohio State University Moritz College of Law, where she was later appointed to the Lawrence Herman Professorship in Law.

Kwoka is an elected member of the American Law Institute.
