= Steven F. Huefner =

Steven F. Huefner is an American legal scholar.

Huefner graduated from Harvard College in 1986 with a Bachelor of Arts degree in philosophy and government, then earned his Juris Doctor at Columbia Law School in 1991. He clerked for David S. Tatel and Christine M. Durham, then worked for the United States Senate's Office of Senate Legal Counsel for five years and practiced at Covington & Burling for two years.

Huefner holds the C. William O’Neill Professorship in Law and Judicial Administration at the Ohio State University Moritz College of Law. He is an elected member of the American Law Institute.
