= Yolanda T. Moses =

American anthropologist and college administrator (born 1946)

10th President of City College of New York
- In office 1993–1999
- Preceded by: Bernard W. Harleston
- Succeeded by: Stanford A. Roman, Jr., interim; Gregory Howard Williams, president

Personal details
- Born: September 27, 1946 (age 79) Los Angeles, California, U.S.
- Spouse: James F. Bawek

Yolanda Theresa Moses (born 1946) is an anthropologist and college administrator who served as the 10th president of City College of New York (1993–1999) and president of the American Association for Higher Education (2000–2003).

== Early life ==
Moses was born to a family originating from northern Louisiana that relocated to Washington during the Second World War to work in wartime industries. After the war, Moses and her family moved to southern California. Moses received her associate degree in 1966, and bachelor's degree in sociology in 1968, both from San Bernardino Valley College. Inspired by a meeting with Margaret Mead, Moses chose to pursue anthropology for a doctorate degree, which she received in 1976, from the University of California, Riverside. As a student, Moses participated actively in the Civil Rights Movement through the Student Nonviolent Coordinating Committee (SNCC).

== Academic career ==
From 1976 to 1993, Moses taught at the collegiate level and conducted research at California State Polytechnic University, Pomona College, and California State University Dominguez Hills. At California State Polytechnic University, Pomona, Moses combined the Women's studies and Ethnic studies programs into a single interdisciplinary Department of Ethnic and Women's Studies. From 1982 to 1989, Moses served as the dean of the Cal State Polytec's College of Letters, Arts, and Social Sciences (CLASS). In 1988, Moses was appointed to the position of vice president of academic affairs at California State University, Dominguez Hills.

In 1993, Moses relocated to New York City where she was appointed to the position of the 10th president of City College of New York of the City University of New York (CUNY). She was the first woman to lead City College, CUNY's flagship campus. She has served as president of the American Anthropological Association (AAA) (1995–97).

Moses has held a senior visiting research appointment at George Washington University in Washington D.C. (2000 to 2004). She co-authored with Carol Mukhopadhyay and Rosemary Henze, the book How Real is Race: a sourcebook on race, culture and biology.(2007, 2014). Since 2007, Moses had held the position of professor in the department of anthropology at the University of California, Riverside and Special Assistant to the Chancellor for Excellence and Diversity. In 2014, she was also a visiting professor at the University of Melbourne's Intercultural and Indigenous Studies Program.

Moses' academic research is supported grants from the Ford Foundation, the National Science Foundation, and the National Endowment for the Humanities, for original research, including the Race: are we so different project (2007–2015).

=== Professional recognition ===
Moses has received The National Donna Shavlik Award for Leadership and Mentoring Women (2007) (ACE). She is a member of the college of fellows of the American Association for the Advancement of Science (2009), and a recipient of the Distinguished Research Lecturer Award from UC, Riverside (2015). Moses also received The Franz Boas Award for Distinguished Service to the Field of Anthropology (AAA) as Public Intellectual (2015), and The Dyason Fellowship to Support Collaborative Research and Innovation from the University of Melbourne (2016).

== City College of New York presidency ==
On May 24, 1993, Moses was selected as the 9th president of City College of New York. At the time, comparisons were made between City College of New York and Dominguez Hills; both were considered inner-city public colleges with large minority and older student bodies. The only CUNY trustee to oppose her appointment was Herman Badillo, who later became the Chair of the CUNY trustees. During Moses tenure, City College continued to report high number of students failing placement tests and teacher certification exams. At the same time, Moses oversaw the renovation of six historic campus buildings, raised admissions standards, and introduced a doctoral program in biomedical engineering.

Moses resigned as president of CCNY under pressure from the City University of New York trustees on July 2, 1999. An article in the New York Amsterdam News reported allegations of Moses' negative job ratings, including a failure to establish rapport with College deans, and the reported involvement of New York City Mayor Rudolph Giuliani in her departure.

== Post-presidency ==
Following her resignation, Moses served as President of the American Association for Higher Education from 2000 through 2003. She currently serves as Professor of Anthropology and the Associate Vice Chancellor for Diversity, Equity and Excellence at the University of California, Riverside.
