= Frank R. Strong =

American academic

11th Dean of Moritz College of Law
- In office 1952–1965
- Preceded by: Jefferson B. Fordham
- Succeeded by: Ivan C. Rutledge

Personal details
- Died: 2001
- Education: Yale (B.A.); Yale (J.D.)
- Occupation: Dean; Professor; Lawyer

Frank R. Strong was the eleventh Dean of the Ohio State University Moritz College of Law.

== Education ==
Strong earned his bachelor's degree from Yale University in 1929. He then received his J.D. degree from the Yale Law School in 1934.

== Legal career ==
Strong entered academia as a professor of law at the University of Iowa College of Law from 1934 to 1937. He then moved to the Ohio State University Moritz College of Law from 1937 to 1965, where he served as the eleventh Dean of the Moritz College of Law from 1952 to 1965. The Moritz College of Law's annual Judges' Day is named the Frank R. Strong Forum in honor of Strong. In 1965, he moved to University of North Carolina School of Law, where he spent the rest of his career.

== Scholarly work ==
Strong focused his scholarly work on constitutional law.

Academic offices
Preceded by Jefferson B. Fordham	Dean of Moritz College of Law; 1952-1965	Succeeded by Ivan C. Rutledge
