= Marc Spindelman =

Marc Spindelman is an American legal scholar.

Spindelman graduated from Johns Hopkins University and the University of Michigan Law School. He holds the Isadore and Ida Topper Professorship of Law at the Ohio State University Moritz College of Law.

Spindelman is an elected member of the American Law Institute.
