= Alonzo H. Tuttle =

American legal scholar and politician (1872–1940)

Alonzo Hubert Tuttle (August 30, 1872 – November 23, 1940) was an American legal scholar and politician.

Alonzo Tuttle was born in Decatur, Illinois, on August 30, 1872, to parents Charles A. and Henrietta. He graduated from Decatur High School in his hometown, then earned a bachelor's and master's degree from the University of Michigan. He then taught within Ohio State University's department of political science while pursuing a doctorate in law at the Moritz College of Law. In 1908, Tuttle formally joined the Moritz faculty. In the 1910s, he served a single term on the Ohio Senate. During World War I, Tuttle served in the United States Army Quartermaster Corps. As a legal academic, Tuttle specialized in constitutional law, and was secretary of Moritz Law before serving as acting dean from 1926 to 1928. Illness forced him to step down as dean, and later reduced his course load, but Tuttle did not formally retire from his professorship until the summer of 1940. He died on November 23, 1940, in Columbus, Ohio. Tuttle's former students commissioned a portrait of him, and donated the work to Moritz's Law Library.
