= List of professorial positions at Harvard Law School =

The following is a list of named professorial positions at Harvard Law School:

- James Barr Ames Professor of Law – named for James Barr Ames, who served as the dean of Harvard Law from 1895 to 1910
- Bemis Professor of International Law – the first of the professorial positions at Harvard Law, it was endowed in the will of George Bemis
- Louis D. Brandeis Professor of Law
- Bruce Bromley Professor of Law
- Bussey Professor of Law – named for Benjamin Bussey, American politician
- Byrne Professor of Administrative Law
- Carter Professor of General Jurisprudence
- Jesse Climenko Professor of Law
- John F. Cogan, Jr. Professor of Law
- The Custodian of the Two Holy Mosques Assistant Professor of Islamic Legal Studies
- Felix Frankfurter Professor of Law
- Paul A. Freund Professor of Law
- Henry J. Friendly Professor of Law
- Fessenden Professor of Law
- William J. Friedman & Alicia Townsend Friedman Professor of Law, Economics and Finance
- Eli Goldston Professor of Law
- Leo Gottlieb Professor of Law
- John L. Gray Professor of Law
- Hieken Professor of Patent Law
- Louis A. Horvitz Professor of Law
- Manley Hudson Professor of Law
- Kirkland & Ellis Professor of Law
- Langdell Professor of Law
- Learned Hand Professor of Law
- Carl M. Loeb University Professor
- Mitsubishi Professor of Japanese Legal Studies
- Nomura Professor of International Financial Systems
- William Nelson Cromwell Professor of Law
- Roscoe Pound Professor of Law
- Ezra Ripley Thayer Professor of Law
- Ropes & Gray Professor of Law.
- Samuel R. Rosenthal Professor of Law
- Royall Professor of Law
- Henry Shattuck Professor of Law
- J. Sinclair Armstrong Professor of International, Foreign and Comparative Law
- Jeremiah Smith, Jr., Professor of Law
- Charles Stebbins Fairchild Professor of Law.
- Henry L. Stimson Professor of Law
- Story Professor of Law
- Stanley S. Surrey Professor of Law
- Touroff-Glueck Professor in Criminal Justice
- Ralph S. Tyler, Jr. Professor of Constitutional Law
- Robert Walmsley University Professor
- Austin Wakeman Scott Professor of Law
- Charles Warren Professor of American Legal History
- Morris Wasserstein Public Interest Professor of Law
- John H. Watson, Jr. Professor of Law
- Weld Professor of Law
- Paul W. Williams Professor of Criminal Justice
- Samuel Williston Professor of Law
