= Ohio State University Moritz College of Law =

Public law school in Columbus, Ohio, US

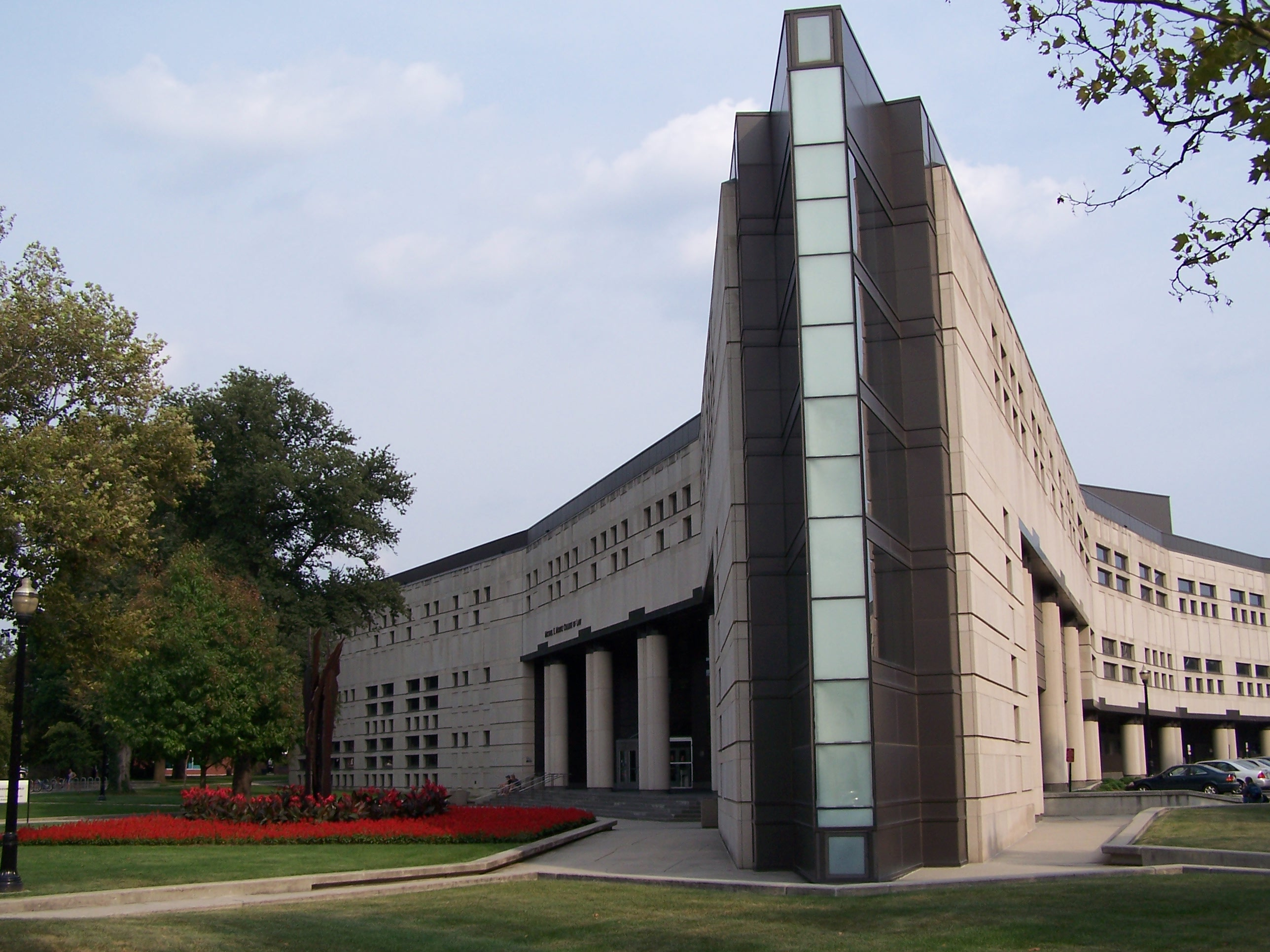
- Parent school: Ohio State University
- Established: 1891; 135 years ago
- School type: Public law school
- Parent endowment: $7.4 billion
- Dean: Kent Barnett
- Location: Columbus, Ohio, United States; 39°59′46″N 83°00′29″W
- Enrollment: 561
- Faculty: 80
- USNWR ranking: 28th (tie) (2025)
- Bar pass rate: 91.95% (2024 first-time takers)
- Website: moritzlaw.osu.edu
- ABA profile: officialguide.lsac.org

The Ohio State Michael E. Moritz College of Law is the law school of Ohio State University, a public land-grant research university in Columbus, Ohio. Founded in 1891, the school is located in Drinko Hall on Ohio State's main campus in Columbus. The school is accredited by the American Bar Association (ABA) and is a charter member of the Association of American Law Schools.

According to the college's official 2024 ABA-required disclosures, 93.8% of the Class of 2024 obtained full-time, long-term, and bar passage-required employment 10 months after graduation.

== History ==
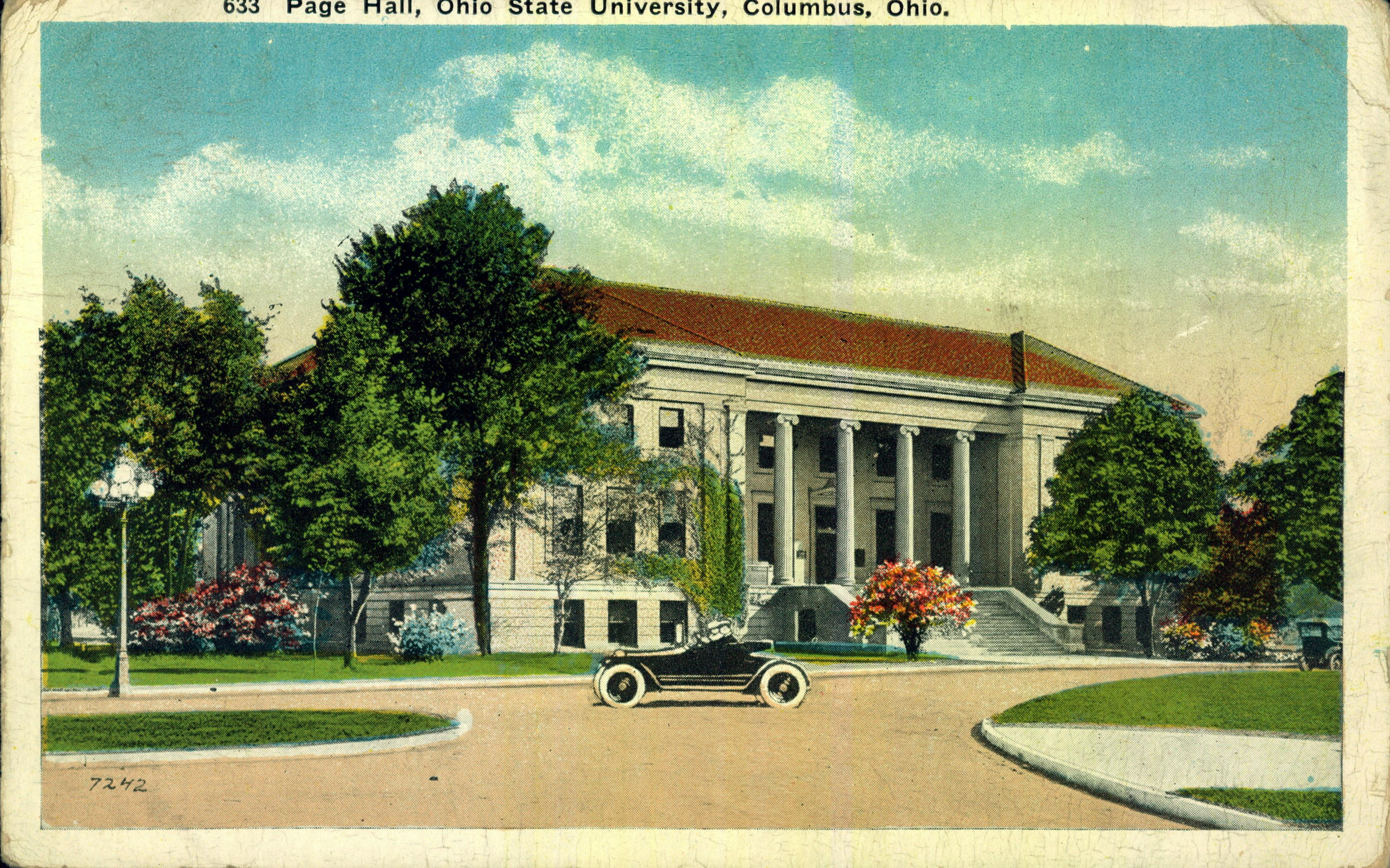
Page Hall

The board of trustees of the Ohio State University officially sanctioned a law school in June 1885 after approving a resolution introduced by trustee Peter H. Clark, an early African-American civil rights activist. However, it was not until October 1891 that the law school was formally opened to 33 students, including 1 woman, in the basement of the second Franklin County Courthouse. Marshall Jay Williams, a Justice of the Ohio Supreme Court served as the first dean of the law school and lectured for two years before resigning in 1893. In 1896, the University elevated the law school to its present-day College of Law status.

In 1903, the College of Law moved to Page Hall, its first permanent building on the main campus of the University (now home to the John Glenn College of Public Affairs), named in honor of Henry F. Page, a prominent Ohio attorney who had left his estate to the University. Over the next four decades, the College of Law experienced rapid growth under the successive leadership of deans William F. Hunter, Joseph H. Outhwaite, John Jay Adams and Herschel W. Arant. The College of Law continued under the successive leadership of deans Gregory H. Williams, Nancy H. Rogers, Alan C. Michaels, Lincoln L. Davies and now Kent Barnett.

The modern-day building that now houses the Moritz College of Law since 1958, Drinko Hall, is named after attorney and College of Law benefactor John Deaver Drinko, former Managing Partner of BakerHostetler in Cleveland, Ohio. Drinko graduated from the College of Law in 1944 and received a Distinguished Alumnus Award in 1991. In 2001, the College of Law received a $30 million donation from benefactor Michael E. Moritz, former partner of BakerHostetler in Columbus, Ohio. Moritz received his undergraduate degree from the Ohio State University Fisher College of Business in 1954 and law degree from the College of Law in 1961, where he graduated at the top of his class. At the time, it was the largest single gift to Ohio State University. The donation provided full-tuition grants with stipends to 30 law students, 4 endowed faculty chairs, 3 service awards for students, and a fund for use by the dean. The College of Law completed a supplemental campaign to raise an additional $30 million to match Moritz's gift and make further improvements.

== Admissions ==
For the class entering in 2025, Moritz College of Law accepted 24.62% of applicants, with 28.01% of those accepted enrolling. The average enrollee had a 168 LSAT score and 3.91 undergraduate GPA.

== Rankings and reputation ==
In 2025, U.S. News & World Report ranked the Moritz College of Law's tied for 28th out of 197 for Best Law Schools. The College's Program on Dispute Resolution was named #1 in the nation with nine other programs in the top 50. Above the Law ranked the Moritz College of Law as the 41st best law school in America in 2024.

According to professor Brian Leiter's "Scholarly Impact Score" that is based on about 500 participants and nearly 70,000 votes on paired comparisons, the Moritz College of Law faculty ranked tied for 34th in scholarly impact in 2024.

== Journals ==
The Ohio State Moritz College of Law publishes five legal journals:

- The Ohio State Law Journal was founded in 1935 as the "Law Journal of the Student Bar Association" and was originally a "section" of the Student Bar Association and funded by student contributions. Robert E. Leach '35, former Chief Justice of the Ohio Supreme Court, was the first editor of the Law Journal. Today, the journal is edited by students and publishes six issues each year. In April 2012, OSLJ launched Furthermore, an online supplement to the print version, which in 2019 became Ohio State Law Journal Online. According to Bepress and its ExpressO Top 100 Law Review Rankings, the Ohio State Law Journal is the most popular law review accessed by authors on its online submission delivery service for legal scholars.
- The Ohio State Technology Law Journal (published semiannually; interdisciplinary journal focused on the intersection of technology and the law; faculty-edited in collaboration with student editors).
- The Ohio State Journal on Dispute Resolution (sponsored quarterly journal of the American Bar Association focusing on alternative dispute resolution; student-edited; founded in 1985).
- The Ohio State Journal of Criminal Law (published semiannually; peer-evaluated, faculty-student cooperative venture).
- The Ohio State Business Law Journal (published semiannually; student run; focuses on legal issues facing entrepreneurs, small business owners, and venture capitalists).

== Moot Court & Lawyering Skills Program ==
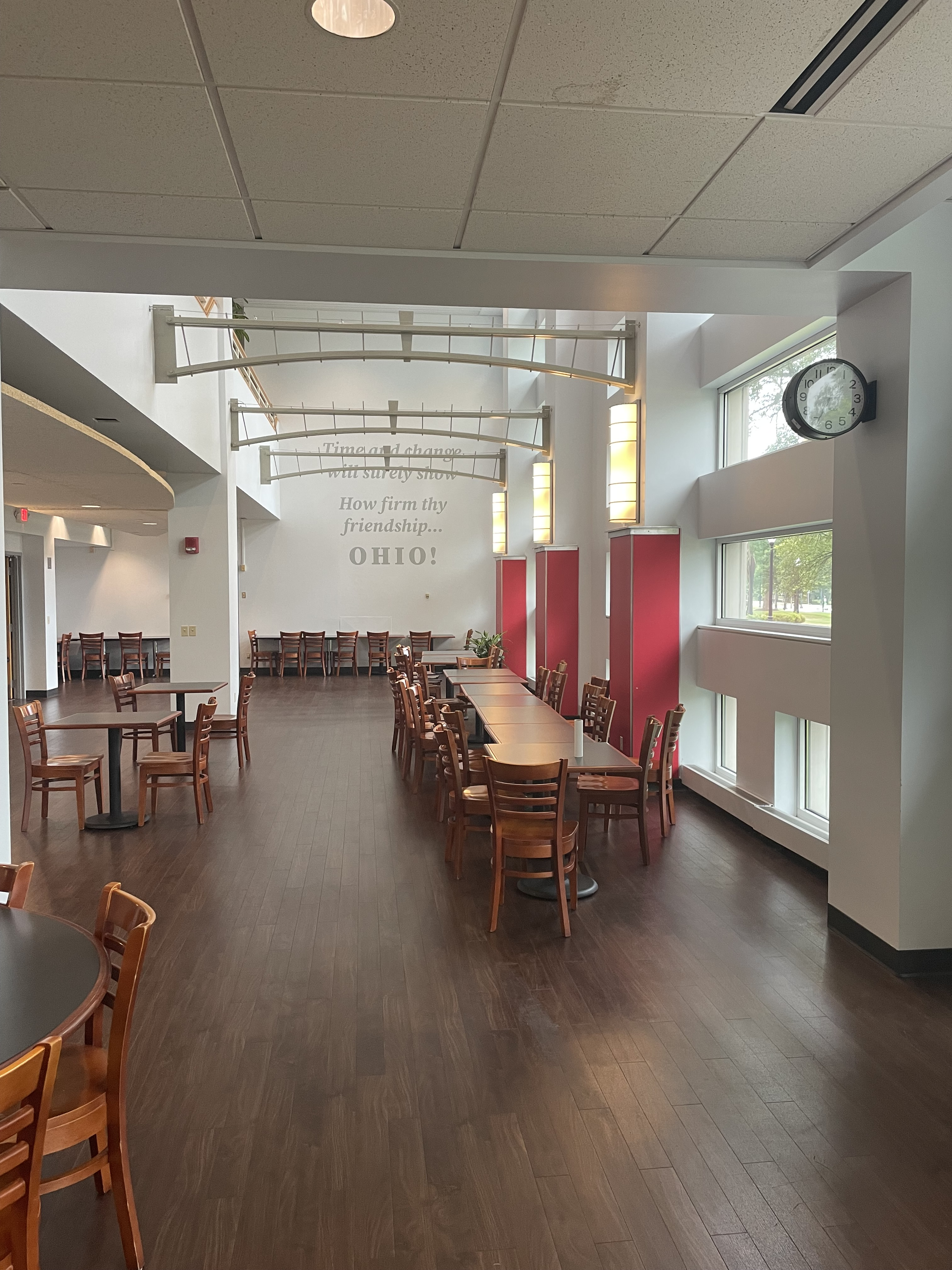
Lou's Cafe at Drinko Hall

The Moot Court & Lawyering Skills Program includes intramural competitions and inter-scholastic teams covering various areas of the law. The Moot Court and Lawyering Skills Governing Board is responsible for organizing and administering four intramural competitions: the Herman Moot Court Competition, Colley Trial Practice Competition, the Representation in Mediation Competition, and the Lawrence Negotiations Competition. The Moot Court Board is a student-run organization that oversees and assists various Moot Court teams that compete nationally against other schools. During the 2024-25 academic year, Moritz lawyering skills teams won two national championships.

== Drug Enforcement and Policy Center ==
The Drug Enforcement and Policy Center (DEPC) examines the impact of modern drug laws, policies and enforcement on personal freedoms and human well-being, giving sustained attention to analyzing the rapid evolution of marijuana laws and the impacts of reform efforts. The center focuses on conducting and supporting interdisciplinary, evidence-based research, scholarship, education, community outreach and public engagement on the myriad issues and societal impacts surrounding the reform of criminal and civil laws prohibiting or regulating the use and distribution of traditionally illicit drugs.

The center was founded in 2017 following a $4.5 million gift from the Charles Koch Foundation. The center also received a $5 million gift from the Menard Family and Menard Inc. In addition to these gifts, DEPC receives funding from a number of research and project grants.

== Bar examination passage ==
The overall bar examination passage rate for Moritz College of Law first-time examination takers in the class of 2024 was 91.95%. The Ultimate Bar Pass Rate, which the ABA defines as the passage rate for graduates who sat for bar examinations within two years of graduating, was 95.08% for the class of 2022.

== Post-graduation employment ==
According to the college's official 2024 ABA-required disclosures, 93.8% of the Class of 2024 obtained full-time, long-term, and bar passage-required employment 10 months after graduation

Ohio was the main employment destination for 2024 Moritz College of Law graduates, with 70% of employed 2024 graduates working in the state.

== Scholarships ==
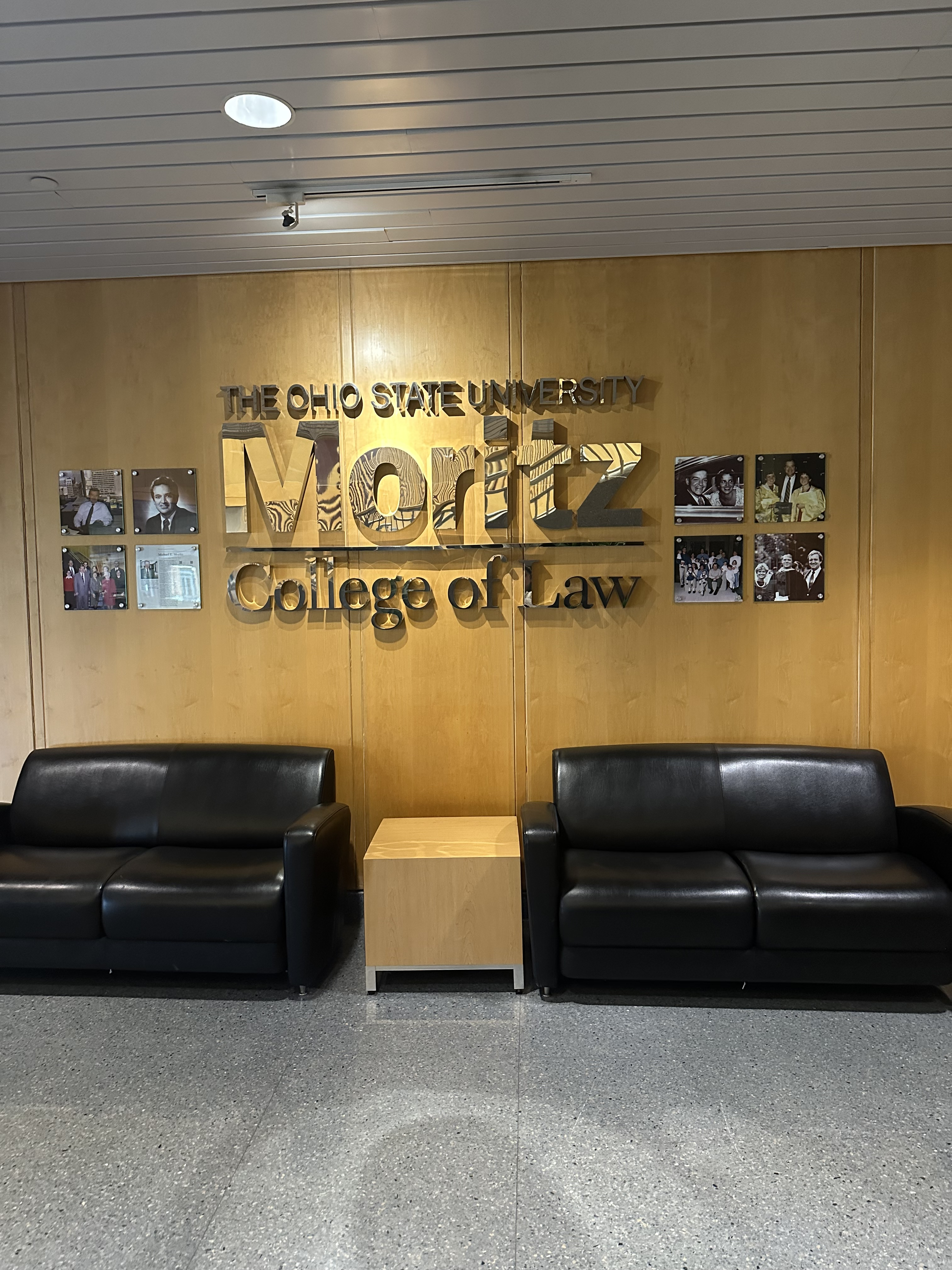
Moritz College of Law Dedication Wall

=== Moritz Scholars ===
The Moritz Merit Scholarship Fund was established in 2001 by Michael E. Moritz '61. The Fund provides for 30 annual full tuition plus stipend scholarships. The scholarships are designed to attract and train a select group of students with outstanding academic and personal histories in a variety of areas including academia, business, law, government, and public interest. In recent years, the Moritz family has criticized Ohio State for not providing the full 30 scholarships (many years less than 15 scholarships were given), mismanaging the investments (the value of the endowment had fallen to $20 million) and using the scholarship fund to pay for university operating expenses in violation of the endowment agreement.

=== Barton Scholars ===
The Robert K. Barton Memorial Scholarship Fund was established in 1968 by golf legend and Ohio State University alumnus Jack Nicklaus. The Scholarship was established in memory of his good friend and Moritz College of Law alumnus Robert K. Barton '62, one of central Ohio's top amateur golfers and law partner of former Ohio Governor and fellow Moritz alumnus John W. Bricker. Barton, his wife Linda, and another couple were killed when their private plane crashed en route to watch Nicklaus play in the 1966 Masters Tournament.

== Notable faculty ==
Deans of Moritz College of Law
Name	Tenure
Kent Barnett	2024–present
L. Camille Hébert (acting)	2024
Lincoln L. Davies	2019–2024
Alan C. Michaels	2008–2019
Nancy H. Rogers	2001–2008
Gregory H. Williams	1993–2001
Francis X. Beytagh	1985–1991
James E. Meeks	1978–1985
L. Orin Slagle	1974–1978
James C. Kirby	1970–1974
Ivan C. Rutledge	1965–1970
Frank R. Strong	1952–1965
Jefferson B. Fordham	1947–1952
Harry W. Vannemen (acting)	1946–1947
Arthur T. Martin	1940–1946
Herschel W. Arant	1928–1939
Alonzo H. Tuttle (acting)	1926–1928
John Jay Adams	1909–1926
George W. Rightmore (acting)	1908–1909
Joseph H. Outhwaite	1905–1907
William F. Hunter	1893–1905
Marshall Jay Williams	1891–1893

The Moritz College of Law has 80 faculty members. Notable current faculty members include:

- Kent Barnett, dean and J. Gilbert Reese Chair in Contract Law
- Daniel C. K. Chow, Frank E. & Virginia H. Bazler Chair in Business Law
- Sarah Rudolph Cole, Michael E. Moritz Chair in Alternative Dispute Resolution
- Edward Foley, theorist of the blue shift and former Ohio solicitor general
- César Cuauhtémoc García Hernández, Gregory H. Williams Chair in Civil Rights and Civil Liberties
- Larry Garvin, Lawrence D. Stanley Professor of Law
- Steven F. Huefner, C. William O’Neill Professor in Law and Judicial Administration
- Margaret Kwoka, Lawrence "Larry" Herman Professor in Law
- Alan C. Michaels, Edwin M. Cooperman Chair in Law and former dean
- Amy J. Schmitz, John Deaver Drinko-Baker & Hostetler Chair in Law
- Marc Spindelman, Isadore and Ida Topper Professor of Law

== Notable alumni ==
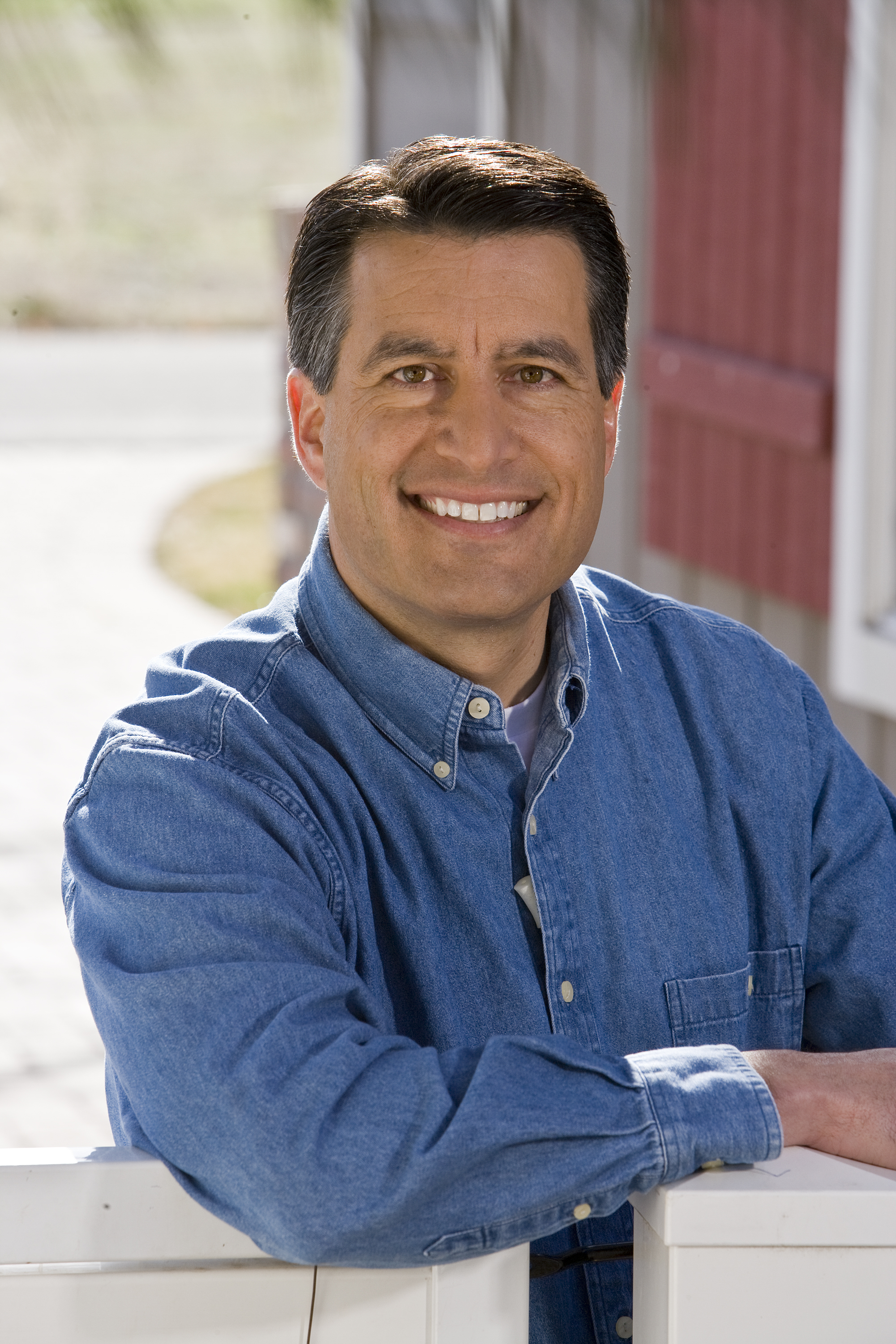
Brian Sandoval

The Ohio State University Moritz College of Law has approximately 11,000 alumni across the United States. Selected notable alumni include:

- RonNell Andersen Jones (2000), American legal scholar and professor of law
- Evelyn Lundberg Stratton (1979), former justice of the Ohio Supreme Court
- Yvette McGee Brown (1985), first African-American female justice of the Ohio Supreme Court
- Erin Moriarty (1977), Emmy Award-winning journalist for CBS News and 48 Hours
- Vinay Reddy (2006), first Asian American to serve as White House Director of Speechwriting
- Brian Sandoval (1989), 29th Governor of Nevada and United States District Judge for the District of Nevada
- Henry Schuck (2009), founder and CEO of ZoomInfo
- Jeffrey Sutton (1990), United States Court of Appeals Judge for the Sixth Circuit
- Gregory J. Vincent (1987), President of Hobart and William Smith Colleges
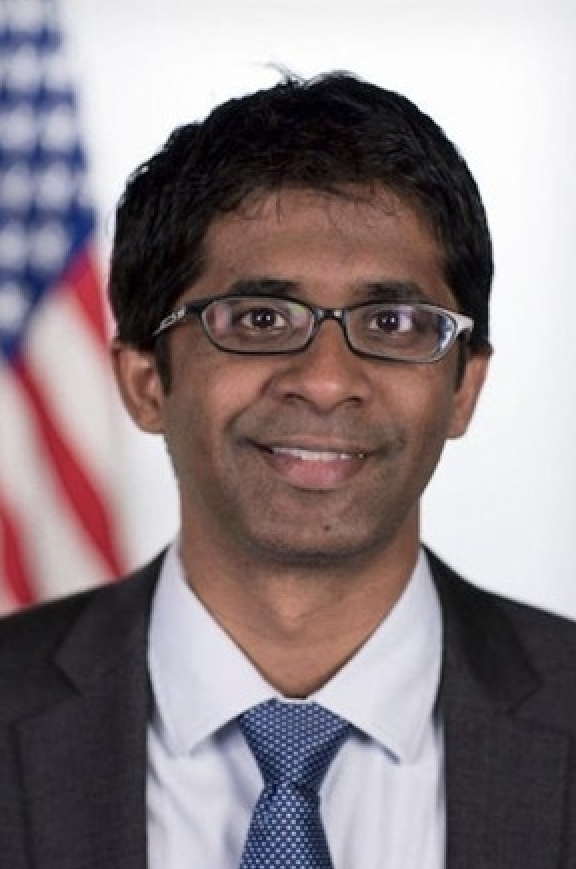
  Vinay Reddy
