= Barbara Robinson =

Barbara Robinson may refer to:

- Barbara Robinson (author) (1927–2013), American children's writer
- Barbara A. Robinson (born 1938), member of the Maryland House of Delegates
- Barbara Cayley Robinson (1901–1986), English painter
- Barbara Paul Robinson, New York City lawyer
- Barbara Robinson (producer) (born 1960), American film producer and studio executive
