= Barbara Paul Robinson =

American lawyer

Barbara Paul Robinson is a New York City lawyer who works with the firm Debevoise & Plimpton. The firm specializes in Trusts and Estates law. She was also the president of the New York City Bar Association.

== Education ==
Robinson received her Bachelor of Arts (magna cum laude with honors) degree from Bryn Mawr College and her Juris Doctor from Yale Law School. At Yale she was an editor of the Yale Law Journal and a member of the Order of the Coif.

== Career ==
Robinson joined the firm Debevoise & Plimpton in 1966. She became the firm's first woman partner in 1976 and later, head of the firm's Trusts and Estates division. In 1967, she established Debevoise's flextime program for child-rearing attorneys, the first of its kind in New York. Among her clients, she has advised a number of wealthy individuals and organizations on trust law, including Yale University, Princeton University and the Ford Foundation.

In addition to her private practice work from 1994 to 1996, Robinson served as the first female president of the New York City Bar Association. She contributed to the publication of a study entitled “Glass Ceilings and Open Doors” which shows the difficulties large law firms encounter in retaining female lawyers.

While on sabbatical from Debevoise & Plimpton, Robinson worked as a gardener for Rosemary Verey at Barnsley House in Gloucestershire, England and then for Penelope Hobhouse at the National Trust Garden, Tintinhull in Somerset. Robinson found these experiences to be life-transforming. She wrote a biography of Rosemary Verey, published by David R. Godine, Rosemary Verey: The Life and Lessons of a Legendary Gardener. The book was widely and favorably reviewed. Michael Dirda of The Washington Post called it an “irresistible biography”. In addition, she has published articles in The New York Times, Horticulture, Fine Gardening and Hortus, as well as a chapter in Rosemary Verey's The Secret Garden.

A frequent speaker for many organizations, Robinson serves on the boards of Wave Hill, Stonecrop and is Director Emeritus and former Vice President of The Garden Conservancy. Her own extensive gardens called Brush Hill in northwestern Connecticut were developed with her artist-husband, Charles Raskob Robinson, over the past 40 years. Brush Hill is open to the public as part of the Garden Conservancy's Open Days Program and by appointment to numerous groups. It has been featured on HGTV's “A Gardener’s Diary”.

Robinson has served on the board of a number of institutions, including the Trust Advisory Board of Fiduciary Trust International, the Foundation for Childhood Development, Teagle Foundation, The William Nelson Cromwell Foundation, Panaphil and Uphill Foundations. She serves on the board as secretary of The John A. Hartford Foundation. Robinson is a member of the Council on Foreign Relations.

Robinson is a Trustee Emeritus of Bryn Mawr College and served as President of the Board of Trustees of Trinity School.

== Sources ==
- Biography of Barbara Paul Robinson at Debevoise & Plimpton
- American Lawyer Lifetime Achievers Award, 2008
- American Bar Association Women Trailblazers Project
- More information and a tour of her own gardens in northwestern Connecticut.
- Washington Post article
- David R. Godine
- NPR Interview
