= Debevoise & Plimpton =

US-based international law firm

Debevoise & Plimpton LLP
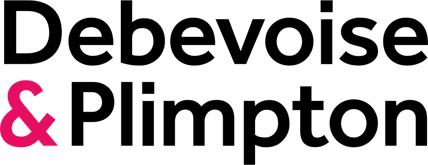
- Headquarters: 66 Hudson Boulevard; New York City, U.S.
- No. of offices: 9
- No. of attorneys: 855 (2022)
- Major practice areas: Arbitration and international disputes, finance, funds, mergers and acquisitions, private equity
- Key people: Peter Furci (Presiding Partner), Mary Jo White (Senior Chair)
- Revenue: ▲$1.329 billion (2022)
- Date founded: 1931
- Company type: Limited liability partnership
- Website: debevoise.com

Debevoise (Note: Debevoise is pronounced DEH-bə-voyz.) & Plimpton LLP is an international white-shoe law firm headquartered in New York City, with offices in Washington D.C., San Francisco, London, Paris, Frankfurt, Hong Kong, Shanghai and Luxembourg. The firm specializes in intellectual property, white-collar crime and government investigations, international arbitration, mergers and acquisitions, private equity, insurance, and securities law.

== History ==
The firm was founded in 1931 by Eli Whitney Debevoise, a descendant of Eli Whitney, and William E. Stevenson, a gold medalist in the 1924 Summer Olympics. Both men previously worked together at Davis Polk & Wardwell. Francis T. P. Plimpton soon joined the firm's masthead in 1933. In 1936, Robert G. Page joined the firm, which was then known as Debevoise, Stevenson, Plimpton & Page. The firm later became Debevoise, Plimpton & McLean after the addition of Edward C. McLean. By the 1970s, the firm was named Debevoise, Plimpton, Lyons & Gates after partners Marvin Lyons and Samuel E. Gates. The firm's name was eventually shortened to Debevoise & Plimpton in the 1980s.

Debevoise rose to prominence as counsel in the bankruptcy proceedings of Ivar Kreuger's business empire in the 1930s. In the 1950s, the firm defended Alger Hiss, a U.S. government official controversially accused of espionage, in two highly publicized perjury trials. Soon after, the firm represented Ford Motor Co. in its transition to a public corporation.

Debevoise's reputation grew with the success of its partners outside of the firm. Page became president of Phelps Dodge in 1947. Eli Whitney Debevoise, who remained the firm's presiding partner until 1972, also served as the Allied Commission's Deputy United States High Commissioner for Germany from 1951 to 1953. Stevenson was president of Oberlin College from 1946 to 1960, and later President John F. Kennedy appointed him as the Ambassador to the Philippines in 1961. President Kennedy also appointed Plimpton as the deputy United States Representative to the United Nations, a role he held from 1961 to 1966. McLean served as a United States district judge of the United States District Court for the Southern District of New York from 1962 until his death in 1972.

In 2021, the firm assisted the Democratic Party in the second impeachment trial of Donald Trump.

In November 2023, amid a wave of antisemitic incidents at elite U.S. law schools, Debevoise & Plimpton was among a group of major law firms who sent a letter to top law school deans warning them that an escalation in incidents targeting Jewish students would have corporate hiring consequences.

In 2023, Debevoise & Plimpton established an internal AI policy committee to oversee the firm's adoption and governance of generative artificial intelligence technologies.

== Reputation and rankings ==
Debevoise & Plimpton is ranked No. 9 on The American Lawyer's 2022 A-List; and No. 18 on Vault's 2024 Rankings of the most prestigious law firms. It is consistently among the most profitable large law firms in the world on a per-partner and per-lawyer basis according to American Lawyer magazine's annual AmLaw 100 Survey. Debevoise was placed overall No. 1 in The American Lawyer's "10-Year A-List," a ranking of the law firms who have earned the highest cumulative score on the A-List since its inception in 2003. The annual A-List ranks firms according to their performance in four categories: revenue per lawyer, pro bono service, associate satisfaction, and diversity.

Debevoise is notable as one of the last major law firms known to use a lockstep seniority-based compensation system. In June 2025, Debevoise & Plimpton introduced a non-equity partner tier, ending its tradition as a single-tier partnership. The move aligned the firm with most of its U.S. peers, where non-equity partners now make up nearly half of all partners across the Am Law 200.

== Notable cases ==
=== Representation of the family that controls Purdue Pharma ===
Debevoise represented four members of the Sackler family, which controls Purdue Pharma, the company that developed and marketed the painkiller Oxycontin. Purdue, along with other opioid makers, faced over 2,000 suits in 2019 by state, city, and county officials who blame prescription opiates for the death of thousands of Americans in the opioid epidemic. For its legal work amid the opioid scandal, Purdue Pharma paid Debevoise the majority of its legal spend: more than $11.4 million out of a total of more than $17.5 million.

=== Assistance to Guantanamo prisoners ===
Attorneys from Debevoise & Plimpton worked on behalf of prisoners held in extrajudicial detention in the United States Guantanamo Bay detention camps, in Cuba. Jeff Lang, of Debevoise & Plimpton, was one of the first Guantanamo Bay attorneys to file an appeal in the Federal appeal court in Washington DC of prisoners' Combatant Status Review Tribunal proceedings. The Detainee Treatment Act of 2005 included provision for prisoners to challenge whether the Tribunals' decisions complied with the Tribunal's mandate. Charles "Cully" Stimson, then Deputy Assistant Secretary of Defense for Detainee Affairs, stirred controversy when he went on record criticizing the patriotism of law firms that allowed employees to assist Guantanamo prisoners: "corporate CEOs seeing this should ask firms to choose between lucrative retainers and representing terrorists." Stimson's views were widely criticized. The Pentagon disavowed them, and Stimson resigned shortly thereafter.

=== 2010s ===
The firm defended Take-Two Interactive Software, in defense of lawsuit filed by actress Lindsay Lohan, which claimed that Take-Two subsidiary Rockstar Games was in breach of her image rights when they based its similar Grand Theft Auto V "Lacey Jonas" character on Lohan without her consent. The case was dismissed on September 1, 2016, then dismissed on appeal, on March 29, 2018.

=== Investigating pro-Palestine student protests at Columbia University ===
In 2024, Columbia University hired Debevoise & Plimpton in response to the pro-Palestinian student protests during the Gaza war. The firm's attorneys were employed to investigate student misconduct complaints and serve as interim hearing officers at Columbia.

== Notable attorneys and alumni ==
=== Judiciary ===
- Terrence Berg, judge of the United States District Court for the Eastern District of Michigan
- Edward C. McLean, former judge of the United States District Court for the Southern District of New York
- John Gleeson, former judge of the United States District Court for the Eastern District of New York
- John S. Martin Jr., former judge of the United States District Court for the Southern District of New York
- Lorna G. Schofield, senior judge of the United States District Court for the Southern District of New York
- Gregory Howard Woods, judge of the United States District Court for the Southern District of New York
- Joseph F. Bianco, judge of the United States Court of Appeals for the Second Circuit
- Jed S. Rakoff, former senior judge of the United States District Court for the Southern District of New York
- Stephen F. Williams, former judge of the U.S. Court of Appeals for the District of Columbia Circuit
- Laura Taylor Swain, chief judge of the United States District Court for the Southern District of New York
- John G. Koeltl, judge of the United States District Court for the Southern District of New York
- J. Paul Oetken, judge of the United States District Court for the Southern District of New York

=== Government ===
- Michael Mukasey, former United States Attorney General
- Paul M. Bator, former Deputy Solicitor General of the United States
- Mary Jo White, former chair of the U.S. Securities and Exchange Commission
- Édouard Philippe, former Prime Minister of France
- Andrew Ceresney, former head of enforcement at the U.S. Securities and Exchange Commission
- Neil Eggleston, former White House Counsel
- Matthew Platkin, 62nd Attorney General of New Jersey
- Maurene Comey, former assistant United States attorney in the U.S. Attorney's Office for the Southern District of New York
- Jim Johnson (New Jersey politician), former Under Secretary of the Treasury for Enforcement and candidate for New Jersey Governor
- Michael E. Horowitz, Inspector General for the United States Department of Justice
- Tali Farhadian Weinstein, former federal prosecutor and candidate for New York County District Attorney
- Bevis Longstreth, author and former Commissioner of the U.S. Securities and Exchange Commission
- Stanley Rogers Resor, former United States Secretary of the Army and Under Secretary of Defense for Policy
- Lord (Peter) Goldsmith KC, PC, former Attorney General for England and Wales and Northern Ireland
- Charlotte Burrows, former chair of the Equal Employment Opportunity Commission
- Eric R. Dinallo, former Superintendent of the New York State Insurance Department and candidate for New York State Attorney General
- Paul Dans, former Chief of Staff of the United States Office of Personnel Management
- Noëlle Lenoir, former Minister for European Affairs and member of the Constitutional Council (France)

=== Business ===
- James Goodale, former vice chairman and general counsel for The New York Times
- Jennifer Chu, chief legal officer and general counsel of TPG Inc.
- Marc Stern, chairman and former president of the TCW Group
- Eric R. Dinallo, former chief legal officer at The Guardian Life Insurance Company of America
- Susan L. Solomon, former chief executive officer and founder of New York Stem Cell Foundation

=== Academia ===
- Anita Bernstein, law professor
- Troy A. McKenzie, dean of New York University School of Law
- Frederick T. Davis, law professor and former federal prosecutor
- Allison Christians, law professor
- Christine Bell, law professor
- Rebecca Tushnet, law professor
- Stephen J. Friedman, seventh president of Pace University and former dean of Pace University School of Law
- Spencer Overton, law professor
- Vicki Been, law professor
- Ethan Leib, law professor
- Gay McDougall, law professor and former United Nations special rapporteur
- Daniel C. K. Chow, law professor
- Alison LaCroix, law professor and Commissioner on the Presidential Commission on the Supreme Court of the United States
- Julian Ku, law professor
- Barry Mills, former president of Bowdoin College
- Thane Rosenbaum (born 1960), writer and law professor
- William E. Stevenson, former president of Oberlin College
- Joan Wexler, former dean and president of Brooklyn Law School

=== Legal practice ===
- David W. Rivkin, former president of the International Bar Association
- Barbara Paul Robinson, first female president of the New York City Bar Association
- Robert von Mehren, leading expert in international arbitration
- Harold H. Healy Jr., former president of the Union Internationale des Avocats and former chairman and treasurer of the Legal Aid Society
- Oscar M. Ruebhausen, former president of the New York City Bar Association and former adviser to Governor Nelson A. Rockefeller

=== Arts and entertainment ===
- Peter J. Kim, founding director of the Museum of Food and Drink
- Antonio Mora, Emmy Award-winning journalist and television news anchor
- Louis Begley, novelist
- Elie Mystal, political commentator and writer

== See also ==
- White-shoe firms
- List of largest law firms by profits per partner
