= Peter Kim =

Peter Kim may refer to:

- Kim-Jho Gwangsoo, better known as Peter Kim (born 1965), South Korean film director, screenwriter, film producer, and LGBT rights activist
- Peter J. Kim, American food museum director
- Peter S. Kim (born 1958), American scientist
