= David Rivkin =

David Rivkin is the name of:

- David B. Rivkin (born 1956), American attorney and conservative commentator
- David W. Rivkin (born 1955), Litigation Partner at Debevoise & Plimpton LLP
- David Z (David Rivkin) (1948–2026), American music producer
