= St Mary's Church, Barnsley, Gloucestershire =

Anglican church in Gloucestershire, England

Coordinates: 51°44′40″N 1°53′22″W

Church of St. Mary the Virgin
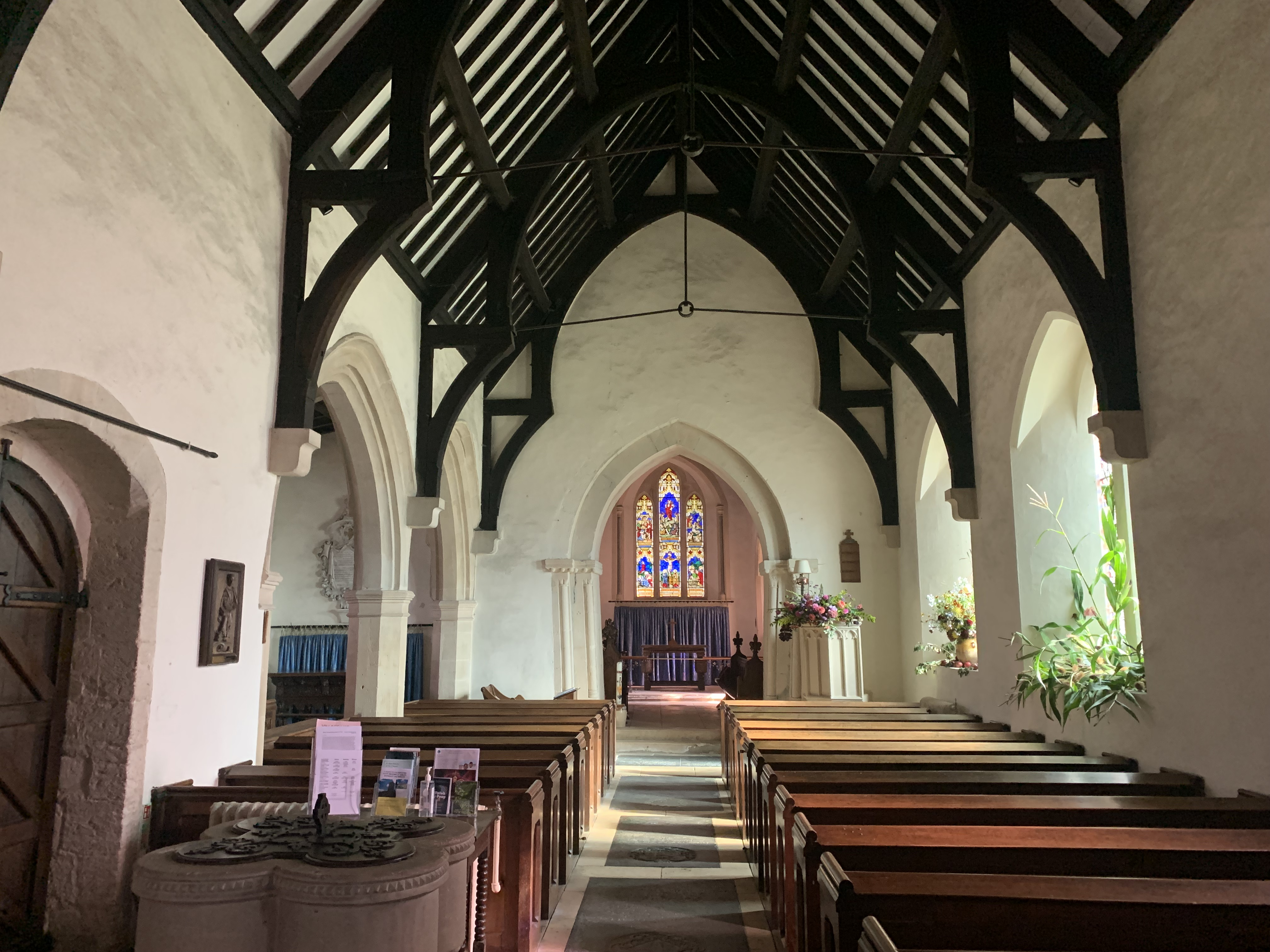
- Interior of The Church of St. Mary the Virgin, Barnsley
- Church of St. Mary the Virgin
- Location: Barnsley, Gloucestershire
- Country: England
- Denomination: Church of England
- Churchmanship: Broad Church

History
- Dedication: St. Mary the Virgin
- Consecrated: 12th century

Architecture
- Functional status: Active
- Heritage designation: Grade II* listed
- Designated: 26 November 1958
- Architectural type: Norman
- Style: Norman, Gothic
- Years built: 12th century, with later additions

Specifications
- Materials: Limestone

Administration
- Province: Canterbury
- Diocese: Gloucester
- Parish: Barnsley

Clergy
- Vicar: Revd Tim Hastie-Smith

The Church of St. Mary the Virgin is an Anglican parish church located in Barnsley, Gloucestershire. It is a Grade II* listed building, notable for its Norman origins and subsequent additions. The church continues to serve as a place of worship for the local community and forms a part of Barnsley's historical and architectural heritage. The church is situated a short walk from Barnsley House, now a hotel known as The Pig in The Cotswolds.

== History ==
=== Origins ===
The Church of St. Mary the Virgin was founded in the 12th century, during the Norman period. While the church has undergone several phases of restoration and renovation, it retains many of its original Norman features, particularly in the nave and chancel. The north door, the main entry, dates from the 13th century, and includes late Norman features.

The church was significantly altered during the 14th and 15th centuries. The north door is protected by a late 15th-century porch, and the nave arcade also dates to the 15th Century.

=== 19th Century ===
The church underwent further restoration in the 19th century. It was thoroughly restored by James Park Harrison in 1843-47 The north aisle features Victorian stained glass by the Wailes company of Newcastle.

== Architecture ==
The church’s architecture is a blend of Norman and Gothic styles, reflecting the changes it has undergone over the centuries. The roof is of stone slate with coped verges and cross finials. Inside, the church retains several important historical features, including a 12th-century baptismal font and medieval stonework in the nave and chancel.

== Today ==
The interior of the Church of St. Mary the Virgin is simple yet elegant, reflecting its Norman origins and later enhancements. Notable features include a 12th-century Norman font, made of stone and featuring carved decoration. The stone pulpit dates from the late medieval period and is elaborately carved. The oldest fragments of stained glass are the Perpendicular west window depicting St Laurence's gridiron, and 14th-century pieces in the south nave window. The chancel windows have Victorian glass by Thomas Willement. There are several 19th-century stained glass windows, which depict scenes from the life of the Virgin Mary and other biblical figures. The church boasts two finely carved Jacobean tables, one in the Musgrave Aisle and another serving as the altar table. The church interior has a number of memorials and plaques commemorating local figures who have played a significant role in the life of the village. There are a number of monuments on the walls and the floor of the Nave to the Bourchier family, builders of Barnsley House, dating from the late 17th Century. The four-bay hammer beam roof in the nave dates to the 19th Century.

== Churchyard ==
The churchyard of St. Mary the Virgin is well-maintained and contains a number of historic graves and memorials. Some of the gravestones date back to the 17th and 18th centuries.

== Current use ==
The Church of St. Mary the Virgin remains an active parish church within the Diocese of Gloucester. Regular services are held, including traditional Eucharist services and seasonal celebrations. The church also plays a central role in the life of the village, hosting weddings, baptisms, and funerals, as well as local events.

== Heritage status ==
The Church of St. Mary the Virgin was designated as a Grade II* listed building in 1958.

== See also ==
- Barnsley House, Gloucestershire
- Barnsley Park, Gloucestershire
- List of churches in Gloucestershire
- Norman architecture
- Gothic architecture
