= List of churches in Gloucestershire =

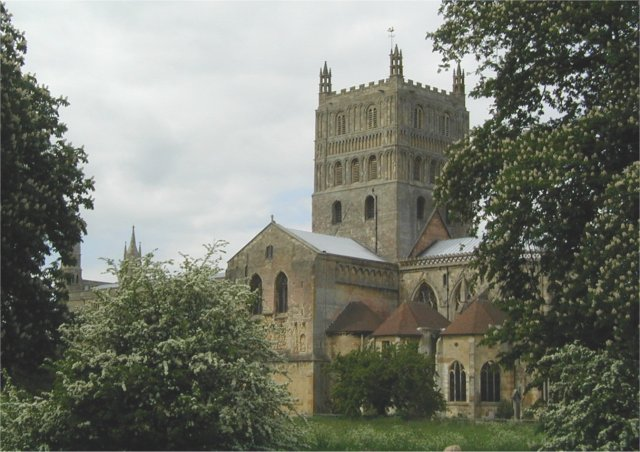
Tewkesbury Abbey

The following is a list of churches in Gloucestershire, England.

== Gloucester ==
=== Catholic ===
- St Peter's Church, Gloucester
- English Martyrs RC Church

=== Church of England ===
Image	Name	Listed building	Type	Diocese	Archdeaconry	Parish
	Christ Church	II	Church	Gloucester	Gloucester	Saint James and All Saints and Christ Church, Gloucester
	St Aldate chapel of ease	II*	Church	Gloucester	Gloucester	St. Oswald, Coney Hill
	St Barnabas Church, Gloucester	II*	Church	Gloucester	Gloucester	St. Barnabas, Tuffley
	St Catharine	II	Church	Gloucester	Gloucester	St. Catherine, Gloucester
	St George Church, Gloucester	N/A	Church	Gloucester	Gloucester	St. George, Gloucester
	St James & All Saints	N/A	Church	Gloucester	Gloucester	Saint James and All Saints and Christ Church, Gloucester
	St Mary de Lode & St Nicholas	I	Church	Gloucester	Gloucester	Saint Mary de Lode and Saint Mary de Crypt, Hempsted with Gloucester
	St Oswald	II	Church	Gloucester	Gloucester	St. Oswald, Coney Hill
	St Paul and St Stephen Church, Gloucester	N/A	Church	Gloucester	Gloucester	Saint Paul and Saint Stephen, Gloucester

- St George Church, Brockworth, Gloucester
- St James Church, Quedgeley
- St Nicholas Church, Hardwicke
- St Owen's Church, Gloucester
- Destiny Temple

==== Other ====
- One Church Gloucester, Banbury Road - Pentecostal
- Gloucester Pentecostal Church, Matson, GL46LA

== Cheltenham ==
=== Church of England parish churches ===
(Diocese of Gloucester) (not a complete list)

- Cheltenham Minster (previously St Mary's) — the original church of the town and the only surviving medieval building.
- St Philip and St James Church, Leckhampton (liberal) — part of the South Cheltenham mission area.
- Trinity Church (evangelical) — one of the largest Anglican congregations outside London.
- St Matthew's – Clarence St.
- Christ Church – Christchurch
- St Mark's – St. Marks
- All Saints – Pittville Circus
- St Luke's – Sanford
- St Peter's – The Moors
- St Paul's – St. Pauls
- St Andrew's – Montpellier
- St Christopher's - Warden Hill
- St Nicolas' – Wymans Brook
- St Stephen's – Tivoli
- St Mary's – Prestbury
- Holy Apostles – Charlton Park
- St Peter's – Leckhampton
- St Lawrence – Swindon Village
- St Mary's – Barnsley

=== Other denominations ===
- St. Gregory's Church, Cheltenham – RC
- Sacred Hearts – RC, Charlton Kings
- Thomas More's – Hesters Way
- St. Mark's – Methodist
- Bethesda – Montpelier
- Charlton Kings Baptist – Baptist
- Gloucester Pentecostal Church-Malayalam

== Tewkesbury ==
- Tewkesbury Abbey

== Cirencester ==
- Church of St. John the Baptist, Cirencester

== Stroud ==
- The Immaculate Conception Catholic Church – RC
