= Harold H. Healy Jr. =

American lawyer

Harold Harris Healy Jr. (27 August 1921 – 4 March 2007) was an American lawyer who had a distinguished career in international law. A graduate of Yale University (1943), where he was a member of Skull and Bones, and Yale Law School (1949), he worked for the United States Department of Justice and was a longtime partner of the firm of Debevoise & Plimpton. He was notably the first American President of the Union Internationale des Avocats, was Chairman and Treasurer of the Legal Aid Society, and was a recipient of the Légion d'honneur (Chevalier).

Healy was born in Denver, and died in New York City.
