= Ethan Leib =

American law professor

Ethan J. Leib (born September 15, 1975) is a law professor at Fordham Law School. He is the author of several books, including Deliberative Democracy in America: A Proposal for a Popular Branch of Government.

Leib was raised in Riverdale, Bronx. He received his B.A., M.A., and Ph.D. from Yale University, his J.D. from Yale Law School, and a M.Phil. from Cambridge University.

Leib clerked for Chief Judge John M. Walker, Jr., of the United States Court of Appeals for the Second Circuit. Before arriving at Fordham, Leib litigated at Debevoise & Plimpton LLP in New York City and taught at University of California, Hastings College of the Law.
