= Eric R. Dinallo =

American lawyer

Superintendent of Insurance of New York
- In office April 18, 2007 – May 28, 2009
- Governor: Eliot Spitzer; David Paterson
- Preceded by: Howard Mills III
- Succeeded by: James J. Wrynn

Personal details
- Born: August 7, 1963 (age 63)
- Party: Democratic
- Spouse: Priscilla Almodovar
- Children: 2
- Education: Vassar College (AB); Duke University (MA); New York University (JD)
- Profession: Attorney
- Website: Website

Eric R. Dinallo is a partner and chair of the insurance regulatory practice at Debevoise & Plimpton LLP and a member of the firm's Financial Institutions and White Collar & Regulatory Defense Groups. Formerly Executive Vice President, Chief Legal Counsel at The Guardian Life Insurance Company of America, Inc. Formerly Superintendent of Insurance for New York State, he was nominated by Governor Eliot Spitzer and confirmed by the New York State Senate on April 18, 2007, as the 39th Superintendent of the New York State Insurance Department. On May 28, 2009, he announced his resignation and subsequently left state government service to become a visiting professor at New York University's Stern School of Business. On August 24, 2009, Dinallo announced that he was preparing for a possible campaign for the elected office of New York State Attorney General. He was defeated in the primary on September 14, 2010, by Eric T. Schneiderman, who went on to win the office in the general election.

== Background and education ==
Dinallo graduated from Vassar College in 1985 with a major in philosophy, and earned a master's degree from Duke University's Sanford School of Public Policy in 1987. He then attended New York University Law School where he was an editor of the New York University Law Review and Essay Editor and a member of the Order of the Coif. He obtained his J.D. in 1990. He then clerked with the Honorable David M. Ebel of the United States Court of Appeals, Tenth Circuit in Denver.

Dinallo lives in Manhattan with his wife, Priscilla Almodovar, where they have two children, Robert and Amelia.

Dinallo's father, Greg, was a writer for TV shows like "Quincy M.E." and "Knight Rider" and wrote an episode for "The Six Million Dollar Man" involving Bigfoot. he also took part in representing the AIG bailout.

== Career ==
Eric R. Dinallo is a partner and chair of the insurance regulatory practice at Debevoise & Plimpton.

In his prior role at Debevoise & Plimpton, Dinallo represented clients throughout the financial services sector and provides counseling on a broad range of matters, including government and internal investigations, enforcement actions, litigation and compliance matters, and regulatory and strategic legal advice on mergers and acquisitions and other corporate transactions.

While Superintendent of Insurance for New York State, Dinallo's accomplishments included resolving a dispute over insurance settlements for the World Trade Center complex, a dispute that had lasted five and a half years. For his work in the New York Insurance Department, Dinallo was named one of the 25 "Dealmakers of the Year" in 2009 by The American Lawyer law magazine, which stated that although he "may have a less-than-inspiring job title...his impact has been impressive." Additionally, he received the 2008 “Esprit de Corps Award” by the National Association of Insurance Commissioners (NAIC), who said, "Under the leadership of Superintendent Eric Dinallo, New York was instrumental in working with Pennsylvania and other states in mobilizing the NAIC's pursuit of consumer protection during the AIG situation."

Dinallo also was named by Governor Eliot Spitzer to lead the state's efforts to reform workers' compensation insurance and medical malpractice insurance. He chaired the Blue Ribbon commission charged with reviewing and modernizing New York's financial services regulatory structure, an effort largely derailed by the Great Recession of 2008 to 2009.

Dinallo joined the Insurance Department from Willis Group Holdings. Since 2006, he had been General Counsel for the company, the world's third largest insurance broker. A member of the Partners Group, the company's global executive management committee, he was the primary legal advisor on value creation matters. His responsibilities included supervising General Counsels, Global Compliance and the Internal Audit Department, as well as implementing corporate strategies, policies and procedures to ensure the effective management of regulatory and litigation matters.

From 2003 to 2006, Dinallo was the managing director, Global Head of Regulatory Affairs for Morgan Stanley. He designed and led top-to-bottom reviews of conflicts and business practices, achieving a major shift in the firm-wide regulatory strategy. At Morgan Stanley, Dinallo chaired the Global Conflicts Committee and was the managing director on the Law Department Diversity Committee. He was also a member of the Franchise Committee and the Operational Risk Group.

Dinallo served at the Office of Attorney General Eliot Spitzer from 1999 to 2003. As Chief of the Securities Bureau, he was charged with combining that bureau with the Real Estate Finance Bureau. The resulting Bureau was named the Investment Protection Bureau to reflect its focus, and Dinallo was named its first Chief. In that capacity, he led the reinvigorated Bureau's investigations into the Wall Street Cases – conflicts of interest in the financial services industry, including research analyst cases and the spinning of hot initial public offerings. Notably, Dinallo won a court order requiring Merrill Lynch & Co. to overhaul its research practices. Among other requirements levied by the court, the firm was forced to disclose in analysts' reports when it was seeking investment-banking business from companies whose stocks were being rated. Overall, he produced more than 40 major civil and criminal matters, and led the Bureau through the beginning of the mutual fund industry investigations.

Before joining the Attorney General's office, Dinallo served as an Assistant District Attorney in the New York County District Attorney's office from 1995 to 1999. He was one of the ADAs with responsibility for certain securities fraud investigations and trial, including insider trading.

Before that he was a Litigation Associate with the Manhattan law firm of Paul, Weiss, Rifkin, Wharton & Garrison from 1991 to 1995.

In 2024, Dinallo was appointed by Governor Kathy Hochul to the New York State Insurance Fund Board of Commissioners.

== Campaign for New York State Attorney General ==
In August 2009, Dinallo announced his intention to pursue the Democratic nomination for New York State Attorney General. The position was held by Attorney General Andrew Cuomo, who was running for New York Governor instead of seeking reelection.

Dinallo's campaign pitch was that he is already familiar with the office, having served under then-Attorney General Eliot Spitzer, but announced his intention to remake the office so that it reallocates resources to "focus on consumer – and investor-based cases that go to people’s everyday financial lives – their phone bills, their credits cards, their mortgages."

In an opinion-editorial piece for the New York Daily News, Dinallo called for New York farmworkers to receive disability insurance, sick leave, days of rest to attend religious services, unemployment insurance, and overtime pay, benefits common to farmworkers in other states such as California and New Jersey. Dinallo championed a legal solution to the problem if a legislative one falls through, stating, "If Albany legislators don't fix the problem, the justice system will have to take this into its own hands."

During the campaign, Dinallo called on Congress to repeal two specific pieces of legislation to increase financial stability: the Gramm-Leach-Bliley Act of 1999, which repealed the Glass–Steagall Act and allowed for mergers of traditional banks with investment banks, and the Commodity Futures Modernization Act of 2000, which deregulated the derivatives market. "They were profound, once-in-a-century missteps" that "destroyed our economy," Mr. Dinallo said.

The New York State primary was held on September 14, 2010, and the winner was Eric Schneiderman

Schneiderman's other competitors in the 2010 race (other than Dinallo) included Sean Coffey and Kathleen Rice, who has since been elected to the U.S. House of Representatives.

== Bibliography ==
- Paterson, David Black, Blind, & In Charge: A Story of Visionary Leadership and Overcoming Adversity. New York, New York, 2020

Preceded by Howard Mills	New York State Superintendent of Insurance; 2007–2009	Succeeded by James J. Wrynn
