= Peter J. Kim =

American food museum director

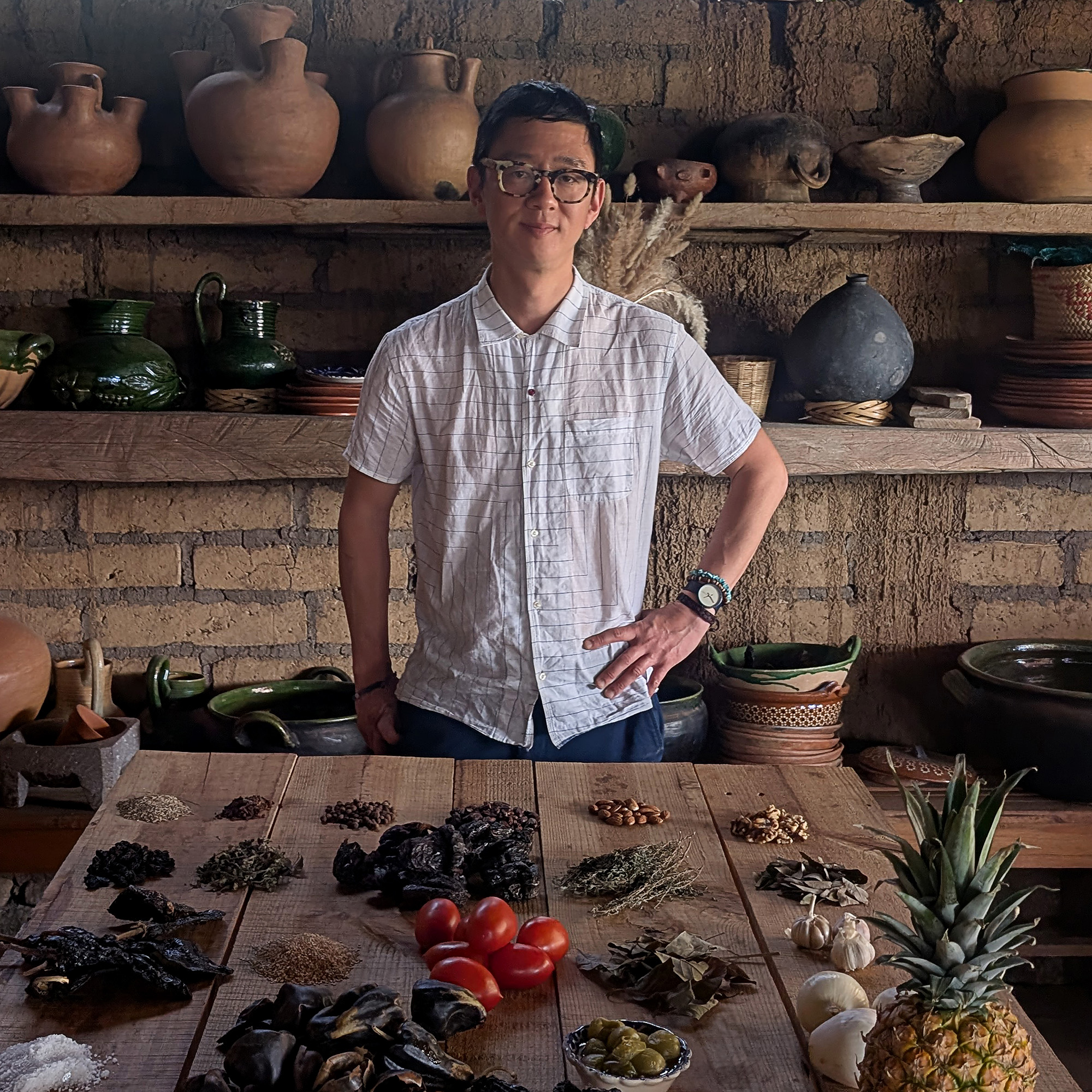
- Education: B.A., Brown University J.D., University of Pennsylvania Law School Master II, Institute d'études politiques de Paris Master II, Université Paris 1 Panthéon-Sorbonne
- Occupations: Social entrepreneur, museum director, author
- Organization(s): The Infinite Table, Museum of Food and Drink (MOFAD)

Peter J. Kim is an American social entrepreneur and cultural institution builder whose work explores food as a means of cross-cultural connection. He is the founder of The Infinite Table, a company that creates 360° cinematic dining experiences that seek to expand appreciation of the world’s cultures through their food. He previously served as the Founding Director of the Museum of Food and Drink, a nonprofit museum in Brooklyn, New York. Kim was the host and creator of Counterjam, a food and music podcast on the Food52 Podcast Network.

== Early life and career ==
The son of South Korean immigrants, Kim grew up in Danville, Illinois. After graduating from Brown University, he worked on Food Stamps outreach. Kim served as a Peace Corps volunteer in Cameroon, where he founded an arts nonprofit called L’Art de Vivre. Kim studied law at the University of Pennsylvania Law School and earned master's degrees from Sciences Po and the Sorbonne in Paris. Kim worked at Debevoise & Plimpton LLP in a group that specialized in international dispute resolution.

== Museum of Food and Drink ==
In 2012, Kim left his law firm position to work as the Museum of Food and Drink's first director. Kim initially worked unpaid out of a 150-square-foot office in the East Village, where he headed a volunteer team. Kim and his team sought to create a major museum that combined multi-sensory experiences with food history, culture, commerce, and science.

In 2015, Kim opened MOFAD's first brick-and-mortar space in Williamsburg, Brooklyn, where it hosted exhibits on flavor science, Chinese American restaurants, Bangladeshi restaurateurs, chickens, and feasts and festivals. The museum featured an open kitchen that served dishes related to its exhibits. The museum's advisors include David Chang and Questlove.

In 2019, Kim announced MOFAD's plans to open "African/American: Making the Nation’s Table" in partnership with The Africa Center. Curated by Jessica B. Harris, a food historian, it was the first exhibition in the United States to celebrate Black chefs, farmers, and food producers. It aimed to show how the African Diaspora has shaped American food culture. The exhibition featured the Ebony Test Kitchen, which was saved from demolition and acquired by MOFAD. After being postponed due to the COVID-19 pandemic, the exhibition opened in February 2022.

== Counterjam ==
Kim was the host and creator of Counterjam, a show on the Food52 Podcast Network that celebrates culture through food and music. Notable guests included Roy Choi, Margaret Cho, Kelis, Jarobi White, Dan the Automator, Ego Nwodim, Femi Kuti, Ziggy Marley, Shaggy, and Michelle Zauner.

== Instant Ramen Kitchen ==
Kim is the author of Instant Ramen Kitchen (Chronicle Books, 2025), a cookbook celebrating instant ramen as a vehicle for culinary creativity. It was recognized as a best cookbook of 2025 by Epicurious, Bon Appétit, and Wired.

== The Infinite Table ==
Kim is the founder of The Infinite Table, a company that produces immersive dining experiences combining 360° documentary film and tasting menus to explore regional food cultures. The Infinite Table’s first experience was Oaxaca: Tierra y Tiempo, combining a 360-degree view of Oaxaca with plates of its food. To produce the experience, The Infinite Table partnered with five Oaxacan food and drink producers, sharing ticket revenue with them.
