= Daniel C. K. Chow =

American legal scholar (born 1957)

Daniel C. K. Chow (born 1957) is an American legal scholar.

Chow attended Yale College and Yale Law School, then clerked for Constance Baker Motley before practicing law with Debevoise & Plimpton. Chow joined the Ohio State University Moritz College of Law as faculty in 1985, where he later held the Frank E. and Virginia H. Bazler Chair in Business Law.

Chow is an elected member of the American Law Institute.
