= Priscilla Almodovar =

American chief executive (born 1967)

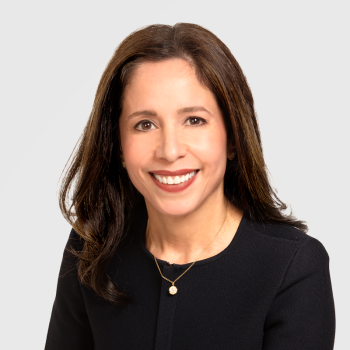
- Born: June 17, 1967 (age 59); New York City, U.S.
- Education: Hofstra University (BA); Columbia University (JD)
- Organization: Fannie Mae
- Title: Chief executive officer
- Partner: Eric R. Dinallo

Priscilla Almodovar is an American business executive, who was the chief executive of Fannie Mae from December 2022 to October 2025.

== Early life and education ==
Almodovar grew up in Sunset Park, Brooklyn and Freeport, Long Island. She received a bachelor's degree from Hofstra University in 1987. She then received a Juris Doctor from Columbia Law School.

== Career ==
Almodovar started her career at the New York-based law firm White & Case, where she served as a corporate finance partner for 14 years.

In 2005, she joined Eliot Spitzer's New York gubernatorial campaign as deputy policy director. After the election, Almodovar took leadership of the New York State Housing Finance Agency and the State of New York Mortgage Agency.

In 2010, Almodovar joined JPMorgan Chase as a managing director, and went on to lead two business segments: community development banking and real estate banking. In 2016, Affordable Housing Finance identified Almodovar as one of the most influential women in the real estate industry.

Almodovar joined Enterprise Community Partners as its president and chief executive officer in 2019. In 2020, she oversaw the creation of Enterprise's five-year, $3.5 billion affordable housing initiative.

In February 2021, Almodovar joined the board of directors of Vereit, a Phoenix-based real estate investment trust. In November 2021, Realty Income acquired Vereit, and Almodovar joined Reality Income's board.

Almodovar became the chief executive officer of Fannie Mae in 2022. She also joined the board of directors of the government-sponsored enterprise. In 2024, Forbes included her on its Most Powerful Women list, noting that she was the "only Latina leading an S&P 500 company." Fortune included her on its Most Powerful Women list that same year and the next. She also assumed the additional title and capacities of president of Fannie Mae that year. On October 22, 2025, Fannie Mae announced that Almodovar would be leaving Fannie Mae.

In 2025, Almodovar was featured in the Forbes' 50 Over 50: Investment list.

== Personal life ==
She is married to Eric Dinallo, New York State's superintendent of insurance from 2007 to 2010. They have two children.
