= Dave Arnold =

American chef and museum founder

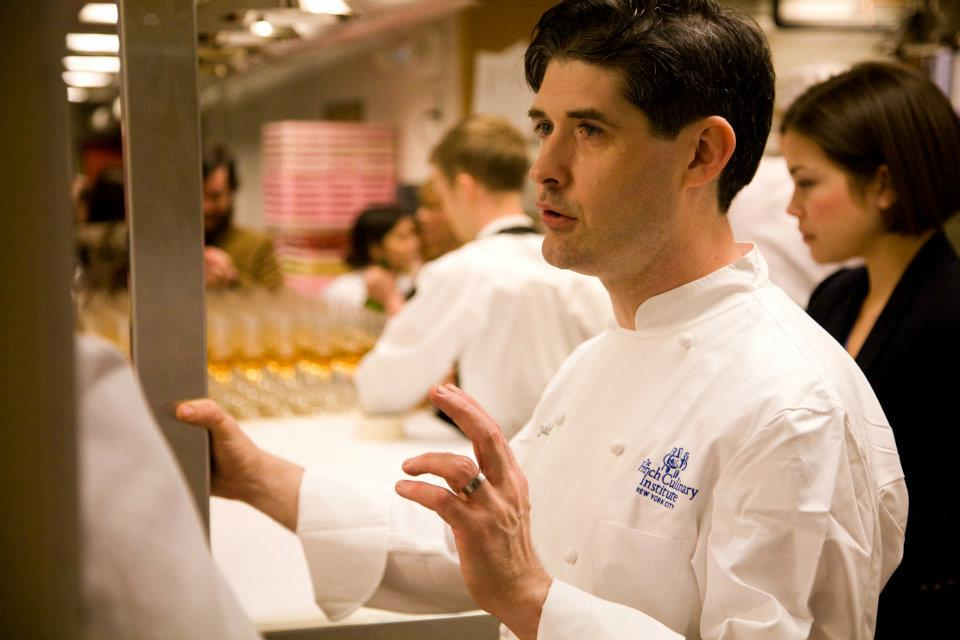
- Arnold in 2013
- Born: 1971 (age 53–54)
- Education: Yale University (B.A.); Columbia University (M.F.A.)
- Occupations: Chef; bartender; radio host; author
- Known for: Founding the Museum of Food and Drink (MOFAD)
- Children: 2

Dave Arnold (born 1971) is the founder and president of the Museum of Food and Drink (MOFAD); the host of the radio show Cooking Issues; an owner of Booker and Dax, a food and drink research lab in New York; a food science writer and editor; the author of Liquid Intelligence: The Art & Science of the Perfect Cocktail; and an innovator in the field of culinary technology.

== Early life ==
Dave Arnold was born in 1971. He earned his B.A. in philosophy at Yale University and M.F.A. in performance sculpture from Columbia University School of the Arts. He worked as a paralegal, performance artist, and pizza deliveryman before he began experimenting with restaurant equipment. Arnold wrote contributing articles on food science and machinery for Food Arts magazine and caught the eye of then-editor Michael Batterberry, who became his mentor and introduced him to the food world of New York City.

== Career ==
In 2004, Arnold started working on plans for MOFAD, a museum to promote learning about the culture, history, science, commerce, and production of food and drink.

In 2005, Arnold was tapped to create and head the first-of-its-kind Culinary Technology department at the French Culinary Institute, now part of the International Culinary Center, in New York City. At the FCI, Arnold taught classes on food technology to culinary students and wrote about his experiments from home-style centrifuges to futuristic cocktails on his blog. Cooking Issues grew into a radio show, where listeners ask Arnold questions about food science and technology, unusual ingredients and cooking techniques, culinary culture, and kitchen myths. The show was previously hosted by Heritage Radio Network, and broadcast from the back of Roberta's restaurant in Brooklyn, New York every Tuesday at noon. Currently the show is funded by a Patreon, and is hosted out of a studio in the center of Times Square, NYC. The show is no longer affiliated with Heritage Radio Network.

In 2011, Arnold paired with Momofuku chef David Chang to form what began as an innovative cooking equipment supplier for restaurants and home cooks and morphed into a high-tech cocktail bar. Booker and Dax, named after Arnold's two sons, consists of a food innovation laboratory on the Lower East Side and a popular bar attached to the Momofuku Ssäm Bar in the East Village.

In 2013, Arnold's Museum of Food and Drink (MOFAD) made its public debut with a successful Kickstarter campaign that raised over $100,000 for MOFAD's first exhibition: BOOM! The Puffing Gun and the Rise of Breakfast Cereal. The exhibit, which features a functioning, 3,200-pound puffing gun that was once widely used to produce puffed grain breakfast cereal, debuted at New York City's Summer Streets festival on August 17, 2013. The New Yorker described MOFAD's puffing gun as "a mid-century relic that embodies, in profound ways, the industrialization and commercialization of American food."

Arnold has been featured in The Atlantic, Time, Food & Wine, Esquire, and Popular Science. He has spoken at cocktail and culinary technology conferences around the world, teaches at Harvard's Science and Cooking Lecture Series every fall, and has appeared as a guest on Late Night With Jimmy Fallon, Martha Stewart Living, The Ellen DeGeneres Show, CNN's The Next List, and The Today Show. CNN has called Arnold "one of the leaders of a 'modernist' group of cutting-edge instructors, chefs and bartenders." Pete Wells, writing for Food & Wine, calls Arnold an "ideal representative of the avant-garde in food", while Esquire labels him "a tireless innovator and experimenter."

In addition to his work at Booker and Dax and MOFAD, Arnold has a two-book publishing deal with Norton on his work with experimental mixology and related projects. The first book he wrote for Norton, Liquid Intelligence: The Art and Science of the Perfect Cocktail, was published on November 10, 2014. He lives on the Lower East Side of Manhattan with his wife and two sons.
