= Barnsley House =

Coordinates: 51.7430°N 1.8902°W

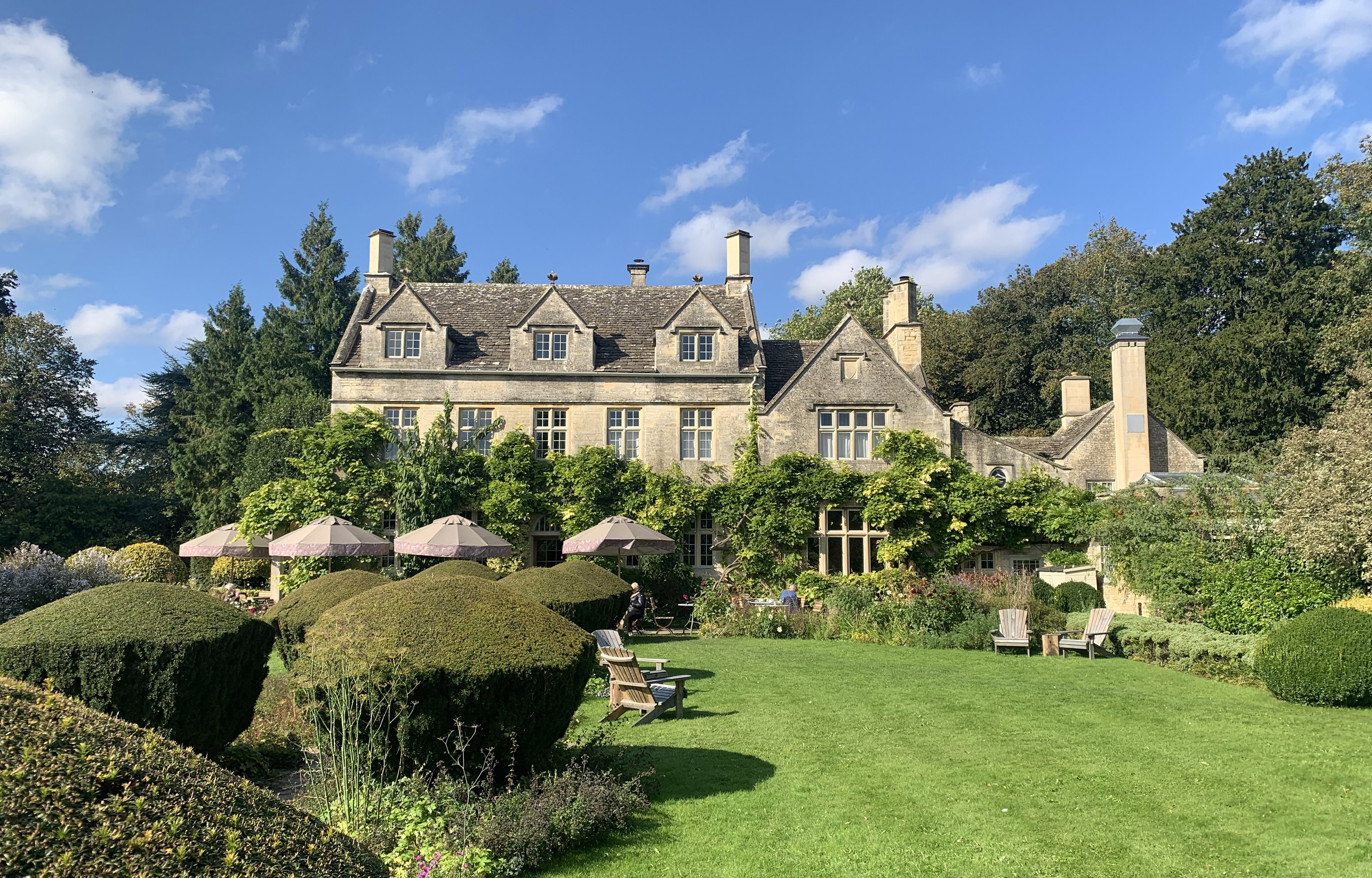
- Barnsley House and gardens
- Interactive map of Barnsley House
- Type: Historic manor house
- Location: Barnsley, Gloucestershire, England
- Built: c. 1697
- Current use: Hotel
- Website: Official Website

Barnsley House is a historic manor house located in the village of Barnsley in Gloucestershire, England. The house is known for its elegant architecture and gardens, designed by landscape architect Rosemary Verey. The house was originally built in the late 17th century by Brereton Bourchier. Barnsley House is today a hotel known as The Pig in The Cotswolds.

== History ==
Barnsley House was built around 1697 by Brereton Bourchier.. It was extended around 1820 or 1830 by the Musgrave family. In the mid-20th century, Barnsley House became notable for its gardens, designed by landscape architect Rosemary Verey. In 1939 she married David Verey, whose family owned Barnsley House. Rosemary Verey moved to Barnsley House with her husband in 1951, and she transformed the gardens into a celebrated work of horticultural art, blending traditional English garden styles with formal and contemporary elements.. Verey was awarded an OBE in 1996, and in 1999 the Victoria Medal of Honour (VMH) from the Royal Horticultural Society. Barnsley House became a Grade II* Listed Building on 4 June 1952.

== Present day ==
In 2003, Barnsley House was converted into a hotel, known as The Pig in The Cotswolds.

== See also ==
- Barnsley Park
- St Mary's Church, Barnsley, Gloucestershire
