= Pedro Pais de Almeida =

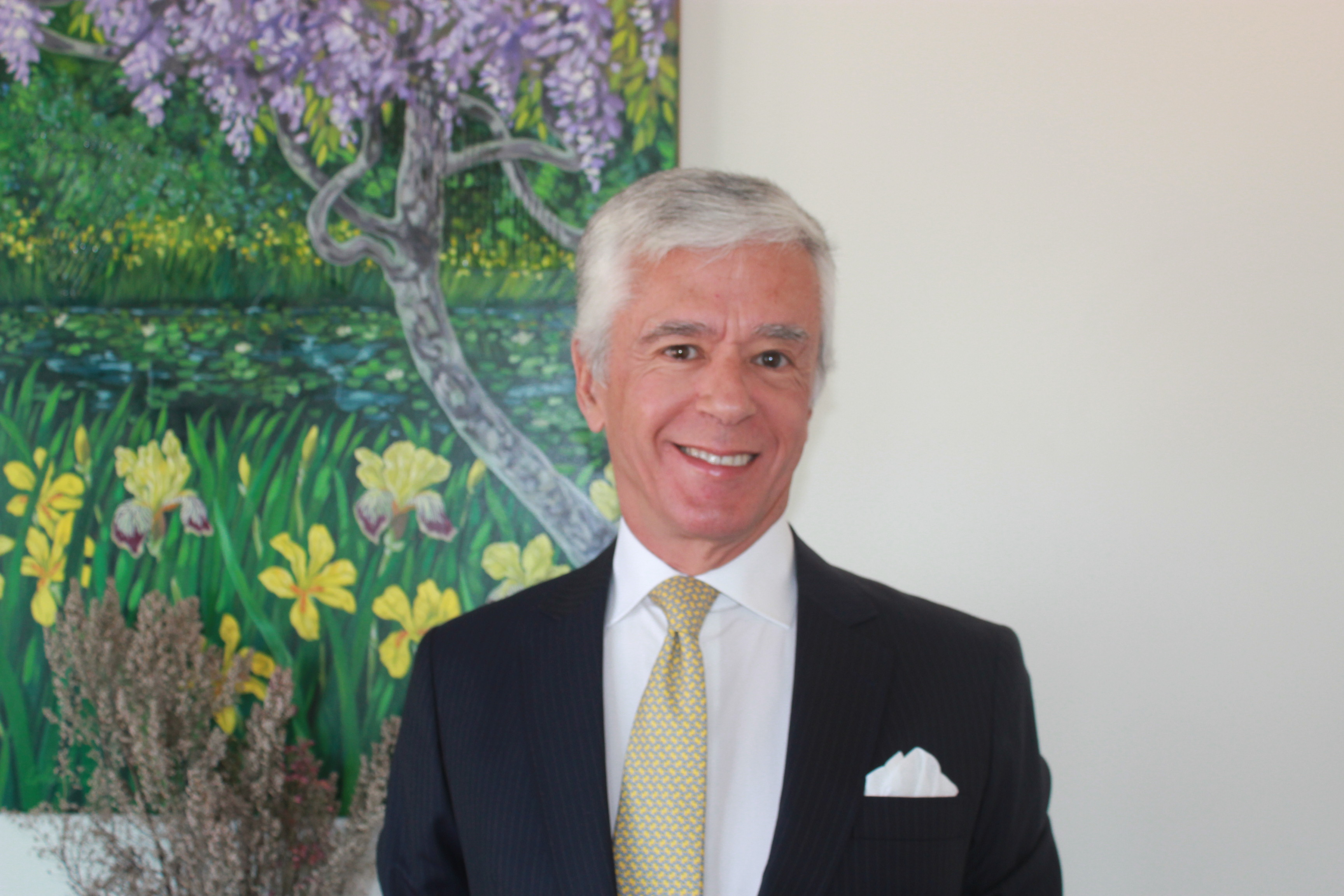
Pedro Pais de Almeida in 2021

Pedro Pais de Almeida is a Portuguese lawyer. He served as president of the Union Internationale des Avocats (UIA) from November 2017 to November 2018 and as president of the Federation of Portuguese-Speaking Lawyers (Portuguese: Federação dos Advogados de Língua Portuguesa, FALP) from its establishment in March 2020 until 6 May 2026.

== Education and legal career ==
Pais de Almeida received a law degree from Universidade Lusíada in 1990. He subsequently completed a general management programme at the Instituto Superior de Gestão in 1991–1992 and a postgraduate qualification in taxation at the same institution in 1996.

He has been a partner at Abreu Advogados since 2008, practising principally in tax, real estate, corporate and commercial law, and mergers and acquisitions. He coordinates the firm's Spanish Desk and Sustainability Committee. He has also served as an arbitrator in tax matters at the Administrative Arbitration Centre (CAAD).

== International legal associations ==
=== Union Internationale des Avocats ===
Pais de Almeida joined the Union Internationale des Avocats in 1995. Before becoming president, he served as vice-president of its Foreign Investment Commission from 2004 to 2006, president of that commission from 2006 to 2011, deputy director of commissions from 2010 to 2011, director of commissions from 2011 to 2015, and vice-president of the UIA from 2015 to 2016. From 2009, he also represented the UIA in the International Legal Assistance Consortium.

He assumed the UIA presidency at the organisation's congress in Toronto in October 2017 and served for the 2017–2018 term. He was chairman of the advisory board of Consulegis from 2013 to 2015.

Pais de Almeida has also served on the executive committee of the International Section of the New York State Bar Association.

=== Federation of Portuguese-Speaking Lawyers ===
Pais de Almeida was one of the individual founding members of FALP, which was established in Lisbon on 10 March 2020, and became the first president of its board. The organisation brings together lawyers and legal institutions from Portuguese-speaking jurisdictions.

During his presidency, FALP organised international congresses and conferences, launched its Journal of Law and Development, established knowledge centres and developed its Rule of Law Observatory. FALP was also recognised as a consultative observer of the Community of Portuguese Language Countries.

His term ended on 6 May 2026 at FALP's general assembly in Lisbon. José Horácio Halfeld Rezende Ribeiro was elected to succeed him as president for the 2026–2027 term.

== Honours and other activities ==
In 2019, Pais de Almeida received the Medal of Honour of the Portuguese Bar Association. The same year, he was honoured by the Barcelona Bar Association during its annual Saint Raymond of Penyafort ceremony.

He chaired the board of CAIS, a Portuguese organisation supporting homeless people, from 2003 to 2009, and has held governance roles at the IES Social Business School and the youth association Crescer a Estudar.
