= Trusts & Estates (journal) =

American wealth management journal

- Categories: Trade magazine
- Frequency: Monthly
- Founder: Christian A. Luhnow
- Founded: 1904
- Company: Informa
- Country: United States
- Language: English
- Website: www.wealthmanagement.com/trusts-estates
- ISSN: 0041-3682

Trusts & Estates is a wealth management journal published by Informa which covers trust law and estates. It was first published in 1904 (as a periodical called Trust Companies) under the direction of Christian A. Luhnow, who was the editor, publisher and owner of the magazine at the time.

Today, Trusts & Estates publishes articles contributed by practitioners in the fields of estate planning and taxation, fiduciary professionals, family offices, insurance, investments, philanthropy, retirement benefits and valuations. According to trustsandestates.com, articles are generally peer-reviewed by an editorial advisory board. The journal is published 12 times per year with a Wealth Management Resource Guide bonus issue in December.

== History ==
Christian A. Luhnow founded Trust Companies in March 1904 in response to the rise of the trust banking industry in the United States. Most of the 1,300 United States trust companies then in existence had been formed in the previous 25 years. Yet, according to the magazine back then, "no other financial institutions of comparatively recent growth have made such giant strides and at the same time are so little understood outside of those immediately interested."trusts in the 1800 were used as business techniques during the industrial growth these ways were often used by large companies
