= St Owen's Church, Gloucester =

Church in Gloucester, England

Coordinates: 51.8630°N 2.2493°W

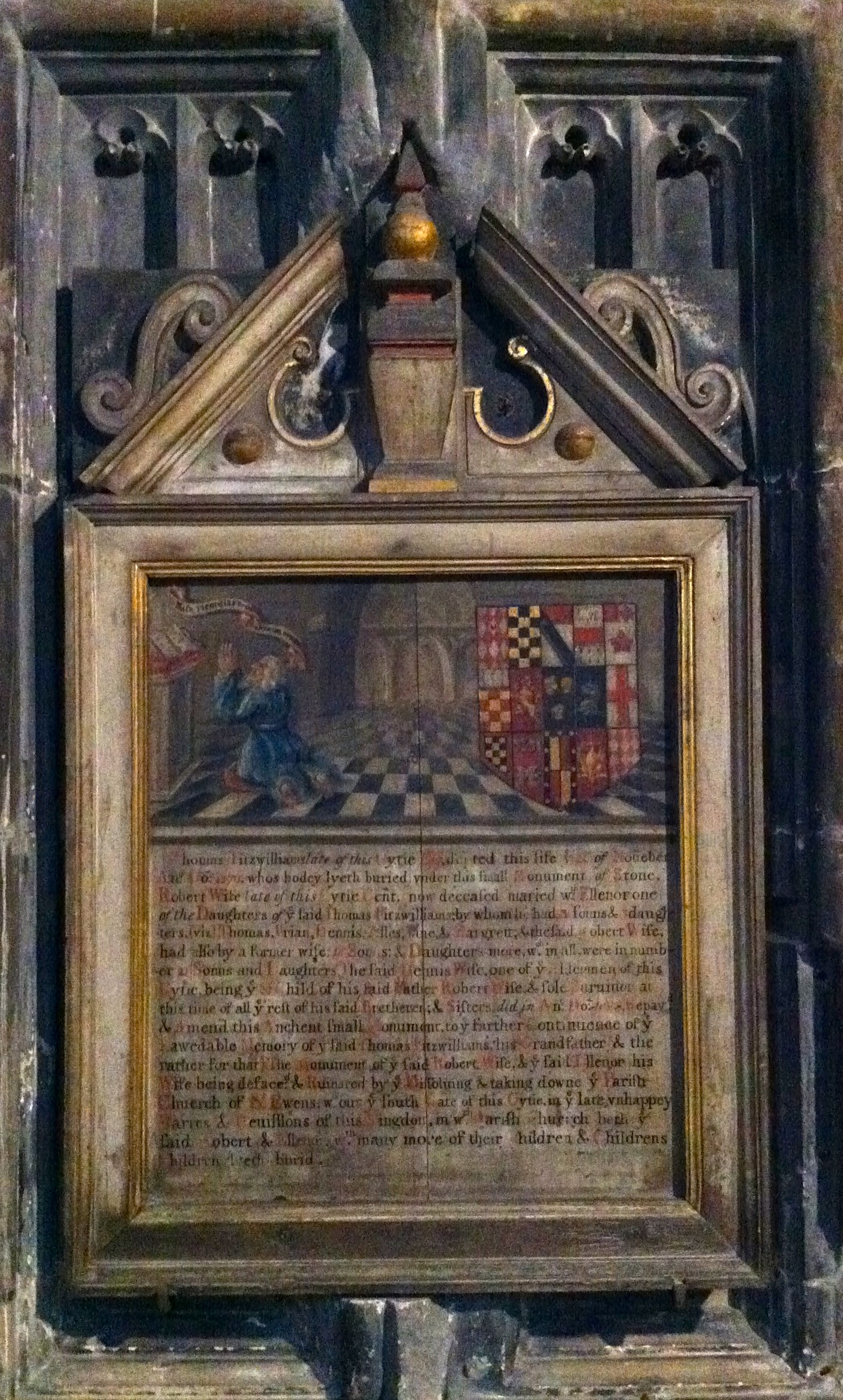
Monument to Thomas Fitzwilliams (d.1579), originally in St Owen's Church, now in Gloucester Cathedral. The inscription makes reference to the demolition of St Owen's Church

St Owen's Church was a church and parish within the City of Gloucester in Gloucestershire, England. The parish church of St Owen's was situated on Southgate Street, just outside the South Gate of the formerly walled city, and was founded before 1100, but was demolished by the City Corporation in 1643, during the Civil War in advance of the Siege of Gloucester.

== Position ==
In 1730 the Southgate Congregational Church was built on the site, and by 2010 the site was again vacant and was being used as a car park.

== History ==
It was probably founded late in the 11th century, by Roger de Gloucester, who provided two chaplains for it.
