= Union Internationale des Avocats =

International non-governmental organization

UIA
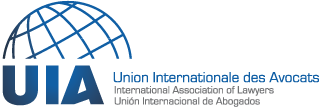
- Formation: 8 July 1927
- Type: International NGO
- Headquarters: Paris, France
- Fields: Law, Human Rights
- Official language: French, English & Spanish (working languages) and Portuguese, Italian, German, Arabic & Mandarin (official languages)
- President: Hervé Chemouli
- Website: www.uianet.org/en

The Union Internationale des Avocats (UIA) or International Association of Lawyers is an international non-governmental organisation, created in 1927, that brings together more than two million legal professionals from all over the world.

== Historical context ==
At the end of the 19th century, most European lawyers worked within autonomous and independent bar associations, each with their own customs.

However, after World War I"," European lawyers gradually realized the importance of helping certain bar associations modernise and build international contacts

In July 1925, lawyers from Belgium, France and Luxembourg initiated the "Union Internationale des Avocats" project, which came to fruition after two years of collaboration on July 8, 1927, in Charleroi, Belgium

The President of the Paris Bar Association, Georges Guillaumin, was nominated as the Association’s first president.

Once the UIA was formed, several bar associations sought its membership. After joining the Association, each new bar contributed unique efforts towards the UIA's dual objectives: adapting older bars to the new economic and international climate, and working with the League of Nations for the establishment of lasting peace.

== Objectives ==
Today, the UIA defends the legal profession and encourages international networking, cooperation and understanding among lawyers with due regard to their cultural and professional diversity

Two objectives underlie the UIA's activities:

- Promote the essential principles of the legal profession and of the development of the legal field in all legal areas of specialisation at the international level.
- Contribute to the professional enrichment of its members via informational exchanges enabled by UIA commissions and working groups.

== Missions ==
Today, the UIA is an association open to all lawyers from around the world, general or specialized, and brings together several thousand members and 200 bar associations, federations, and associations from 110 countries.

Multilingual and multicultural, the UIA is the only major international lawyers organisation to have eight official languages (French, English, Spanish, Italian, German, Portuguese, Arabic, and Chinese) and to work in three working languages: French, English, and Spanish.

Moreover, the UIA has built more than 43 commissions composed of lawyers from jurisdictions spanning the globe. These lawyers practice in law firms, businesses, or public institutions. Each commission monitors the evolution occurring in a particular legal field (or practice) and determines how these changes will affect or be affected by other legal fields. All UIA commissions collaborate to keep each other informed of their respective developments and findings.

The UIA's commissions and working groups are divided into two principal fields: Business Law and General Practice and Human Rights

== Business law ==
The UIA commissions and working groups in business law focus on competition law, contracts, bankruptcy, corporate law, labour, intellectual property law, tax, banking, mergers and acquisitions, mediation, the international sale of goods, and foreign investments, among many other practice areas.

The UIA collaborates with the United Nations Commission on International Trade Law (UNCITRAL) and notably presented a proposition for the definition of a "center of principal interests" (articles 2b) and 16-3 of the UNCITRAL law on international insolvency.

Every year, the UIA organises numerous seminars on international subjects. The UIA's events allow participants to meet colleagues, establish professional contacts and to debate questions about current events and controversial legal topics.

For its annual congress, the UIA creates working sessions for its commissions. These commissions produce reports accessible to all UIA members and organise congressional joint-sessions.

Each year, one or more principal themes are established for the Congress, inciting national and international legal and economic experts to engage in fruitful debate.

== Protection of lawyers and human rights ==
The UIA intervenes throughout the world in favour of lawyers who are imprisoned or persecuted for practising their profession.

Since 1971, the UIA has benefited from its special consultative status in the United Nations and the European Council. Through the European Council, the UIA produced a policy recommendation concerning money laundering and the war on terror.

The UIA is represented in the three main offices of the United Nations (New York, Geneva, and Vienna), where the UIA organises a summit for international bar association presidents. These summits permit bar association presidents to further the work initiated by the UN in diverse domains of international law.

Additionally, the UIA sits at the heart of the Consultative Councils of the International Criminal Tribunal for the former Yugoslavia. Finally, the UIA has followed the work of the preparatory commission of the International Criminal Court at the time of its creation in 1998. The UIA also attends sessions of the Assembly of States Parties to the Statute of the Court. The UIA is a member of the executive council of the International Criminal Bar.

== Members ==
- Individuals: Practising lawyers (general practitioners and specialists)
- Collective: bar associations
- Associated individuals: Law professors, judges and other legal professionals

== Presidency ==
The term of each UIA presidency is one year.

Past Presidents:

- 1930-1931: Paul Crokaert, Belgium
- 1932-1933: Jhr J.W.M. De Brauw, Netherlands
- 1936-1937: Aloïs Stompfe, Czechoslovakia
- 1960-1962: Adelino da Palma Carlos, Portugal
- 1964-1965: Jhr. Jacob H. De Brauw, Netherlands
- 1969-1971: Claude Lussan, France
- 1971-1973: José Luis del Valle Iturriaga, Spain
- 1979-1981: Harold H. Healy, Jr., United States
- 1981-1983: Ernest Arendt, Luxembourg
- 1987-1988: Anders R. Öhman, Sweden
- 1994-1995: Garry Downes Q.C., Australia
- 1995-1996: Albert-Louis Dupont-Willemin, Marqués de Mulhacén, Switzerland.
- 1996-1997: Kottayan Katankot Venugopal, India
- 2000-2001 : Miguel I. Estrada Samano, Mexico
- 2005-2006: Delos N. Lutton,
- 2006-2007: Paulo Lins e Silva, Rio de Janeiro, Brazil,
- 2007-2008: Héctor Díaz-Bastien, Spain
- 2013-2014: Stephen L. Dreyfuss, recipient of the Legion of Honour, received on May 30, 2014, United States
- 2014-2015: M. Miguel Loinaz, Uruguay
- 2015-2016: Jean-Jacques Uettwiller, France
- 2016-2017: Laurence Bory, Switzerland
- 2017-2018: Pedro Pais de Almeida, Portugal
- 2018-2019: Issouf Baadhio, Burkina Faso
- 2019-2020: Jerome Roth, United States
- 2020-2021: Jorge Martí Moreno, Spain
- 2021-2022: Hervé Chemouli, France
- 2022-2023: Urquiola de Palacio del Valle de Lersundi, Spain
- 2023-2024: Jacqueline Scott, United States

== Annual congress ==
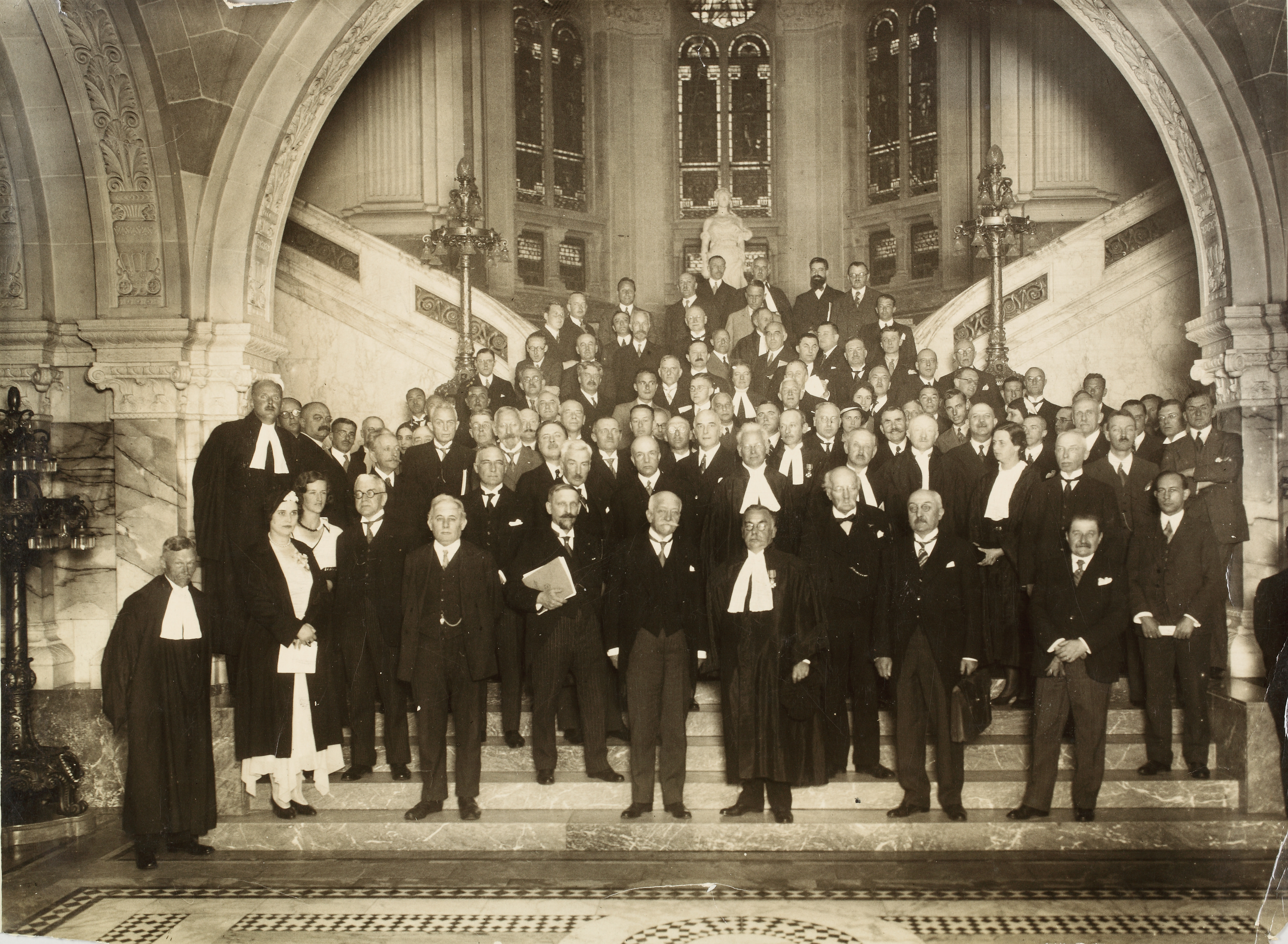
IIIrd UIA Congress in LUXEMBOURG in which Nobel Peace Prize Winner Henri La Fontaine took part (pictured in the first row).

Since its creation, the UIA has organised annual congresses in locations all over the world for members and non-members to discuss legal topics in an international forum.

According to UIA Statutes, the organisation must convene a Congress at least once every two years. Between 1929 and 1938, UIA congresses were mainly annual. The 1939 Congress, which was scheduled to take place in Warsaw on the eve of the Second World War, did eventually not take place:

- 1929 - I Congress: Brussels, Belgium
- 1930 - II Congress: Paris, France
- 1931 - III Congress: Luxembourg, Grand Duchy of Luxembourg
- 1932 - IV Congress: The Hague, Netherlands
- 1933 - V Congress: Dubrovnik, Croatia
- 1935 - VI Congress: Brussels, Belgium
- 1936 - VII Congress: Vienna, Austria
- 1937 - VIII Congress: Vienna, Austria
- 1938 - IX Congress: Budapest, Hungary

The congressional process resumed in 1948, and a Congress was held annually until 1954 (except in 1952) :

- 1948 - X Congress: Brussels, Belgium
- 1949 - XI Congress: Paris, France
- 1950 - XII Congress Luxembourg, Grand Duchy of Luxembourg
- 1951 - XIII Congress: Rio de Janeiro, Brazil
- 1953 - XIV Congress: Vienna, Austria

From 1954 to 1989, a Congress was held every two years :

- 1954 - XV Congress: Brussels, Belgium
- 1956 - XVI Congress: Paris, France
- 1958 - XVII Congress: Milan, Italy
- 1960 - XVIII Congress: Basel, Switzerland - The European Bar Council (CCBE) was created during this Congress
- 1962 - XIX Congress: Lisbon, Portugal
- 1964 - XX Congress: Bonn, Federal Republic of Germany
- 1965 - XXI Congress: Arnhem, Netherlands (exceptionally held the following year)
- 1967 - XXII Congress: Vienna, Austria
- 1969 - XXIII Congress: London, United Kingdom
- 1971 - XXIV Congress: Paris, France
- 1973 - XXV Congress: Madrid, Spain
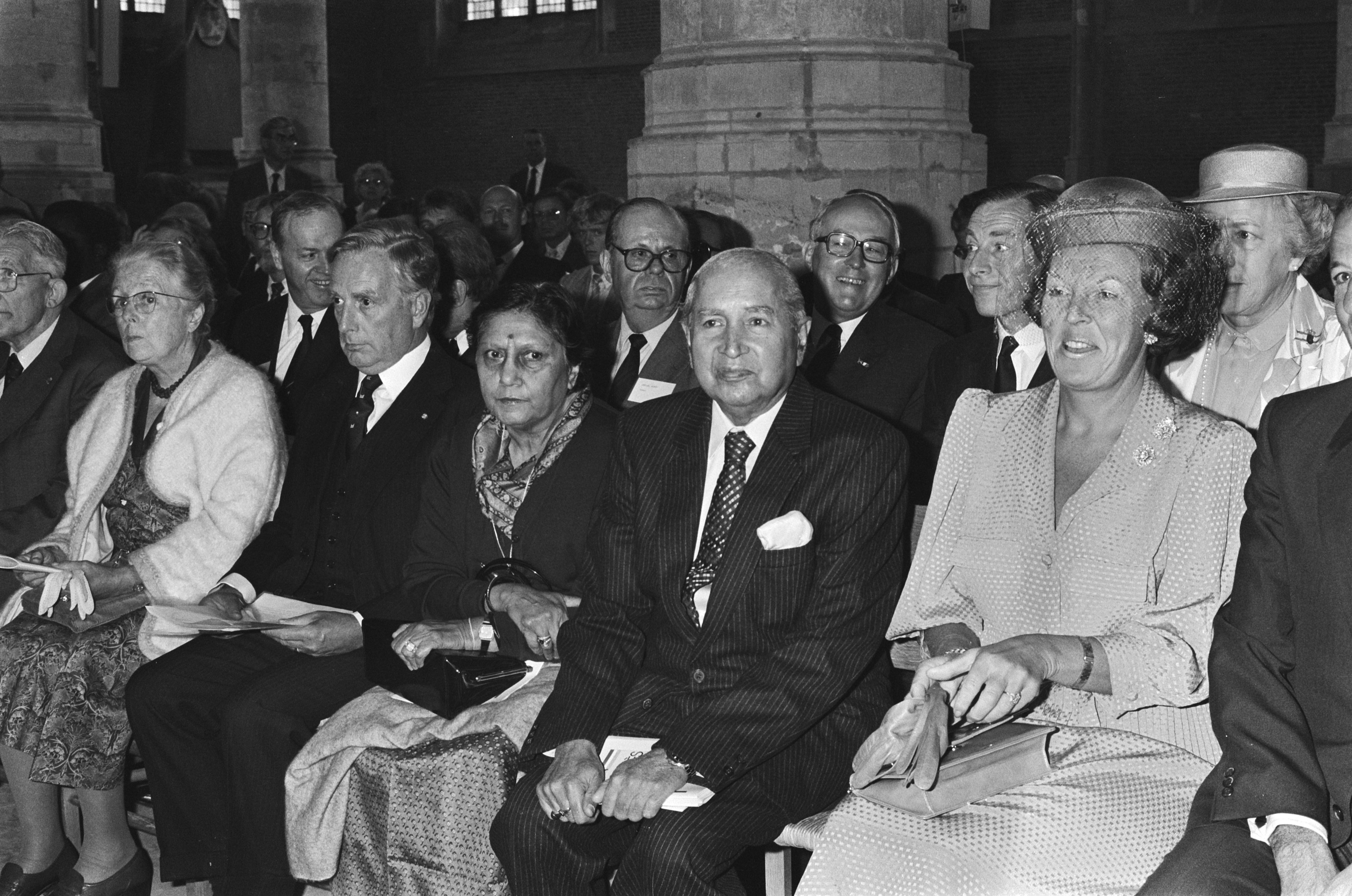
  XXXIst UIA Congress in The Hague in 1985. Opening Ceremony in Pieterskerk - Leiden, from right to left: Queen Beatrix of the Netherlands, Nagendra Singh (president of the International Court of Justice), Mrs. Singh, Frits Korthals Altes (Dutch Minister of Justice).
- 1975 - XXVI Congress: Munich, Federal Republic of Germany
- 1977 - XXVII Congress: Zagreb, Croatia
- 1979 - XXVIII Congress: Cannes, France
- 1981 - XXIX Congress: New York City, United States
- 1983 - XXX Congress: Luxembourg, Grand Duchy of Luxembourg
- 1985 - XXXI Congress: The Hague, Netherlands
- 1987 - XXXII Congress: Quebec, Canada
- 1989 - XXXIII Congress: Interlaken, Switzerland

As of 1989, the Congress has once again become an annual event :

- 1990 - XXXIV Congress: Strasbourg, France
- 1991 - XXXV Congress: Mexico City, Mexico
- 1992 - XXXVI Congress: Berlin, Germany
- 1993 - XXXVII Congress: San Francisco, United States
- 1994 - XXXVIII Congress: Marrakech, Morocco
- 1995 - XXXIX Congress: London, England
- 1996 - XXXX Congress: Madrid, Spain
- 1997 - XLI Congress: Philadelphia, United States
- 1998 - XLII Congress: Nice, France
- 1999 - XLIII Congress: New Delhi, India
- 2000 - XLIV Congress: Buenos Aires, Argentina
- 2001 - XLV Congress: Turin, Italy
- 2002 - XLVI Congress: Sydney, Australia
- 2003 - XLVII Congress: Lisbon, Portugal
- 2004 - XLVIII Congress: Geneva, Switzerland
- 2005 - XLIX Congress: Fes, Morocco
- 2006 - L Congress: Salvador, Brazil
- 2007 - LI Congress: Paris, France
- 2008 - LII Congress: Bucarest, Romania
- 2009 - LIII Congress: Seville, Spain
- 2010 - LIV Congress: Istanbul, Turkey
- 2011 - LV Congress: Miami, United States
- 2012 - LVI Congress: Dresden, Germany
- 2013 - LVII Congress: Macao (SAR), People's Republic of China
- 2014 - LVIII Congress: Florence, Italy
- 2015 - LIX Congress: Valencia, Spain
- 2016 - LX Congress: Budapest, Hungary
- 2017 - LXI Congress: Toronto, Canada
- 2018 - LXII Congress: Porto, Portugal
- 2019 - LXIII Congress: Luxembourg, Grand Duchy of Luxembourg, under the High Patronage of His Royal Highness Grand Duke
- 2020 - LXIV Congress: Virtual Congress.
- 2021 - LXV Congress: Madrid, Spain, Hybrid Congress under the Honorary Presidency of His Majesty the King Felipe VI, presential in Madrid or Virtual.

== Resolutions and charters ==
- Resolution on the situation in Poland (Luxembourg Congress, Luxembourg - November 2019)
- Core Principles of the Legal Profession (Congress in Porto, Portugal - October 2018)
- Resolution Against All Forms of Slavery (Congress in Porto, Portugal - October 2018)
- Basic Principles on the Status of Refugees (Congress in Budapest, Hungary - October 2016)
- Resolution on Privacy in Digital Communication (Congress in Valencia, Spain - October 2015)
- Corruption, Transparency and Justice Resolution (Congress in Macau, China 2013)
- Resolution on Globalisation, Tolerance and the Law (Congress in Seville, Spain 2009)
- Resolution for the right to health as a basic human right.(Congress in Fes, Morocco August 31 - September 5, 2005)
- Resolution advocating for the abolishment of the death penalty (Congress in Lisbon, Portugal - September 30, 2003)
- Code of Conduct for Lawyers in the 21st Century that takes into account rapid changes in technology and the forces of globalization (Congress in Sydney, Australia October 27–31, 2002)
- Principles for lawyers establishing a firm outside of their country, adopted and presented to the World Trade Organization (Congress in Sydney, Australia - October 27–31, 2002)
- Resolution on Multidisciplinary Practices aiming to preserve the core values of the legal profession (Congress in New Delhi, India - November 3, 1999)

== UIA publications ==
- Enjeux européens et mondiaux de la protection des données personnelles, Editions Larcier, June 2015
- Le DIP au quotidien / IPR in het Dagelijkse Leven, Editions Larcier, November 2015
- Current trends in Start-Ups and Crowd Financing, Ed. Thomas Kulnigg, UIA - LexisNexis Publications Collection, December 2017
- Compliance – Challenges and Opportunities for the Legal Profession, Ed. Guido de Clerq, UIA - LexisNexis Publications Collection, December 2017
- Le statut des femmes et l'état de droit, Editions Larcier, July 2018
- Recognition and Enforcement of Foreign Judgments and Arbitral Awards, UIA - LexisNexis Publications Collection, October 2018
- Natural Resources Exploitation: Business and Human Rights, UIA - LexisNexis Publications Collection, October 2018
- Legal Aspects of Artificial Intelligence, UIA - LexisNexis Publications Collection, November 2019
- Drafting Effective International Contracts of Agency and Distributorship – A practical Handbook, UIA - LexisNexis Publications Collection, November 2019
- International Public Procurement, UIA - LexisNexis Publications Collection, November 2019
- Family Law: Challenges and Developments from an International Perspective, UIA - LexisNexis Publications Collection, June 2020
- Environmental Law and Sustainable Development, UIA - LexisNexis Publications Collection, September 2020
- Fashion law : Legal trends and new challenges, UIA - LexisNexis Publications Collection, October 2020

== Juriste International magazine ==
Juriste International is the trilingual magazine (English, French, Spanish) of the UIA. Published four times a year, it has a circulation of 3000 copies.

It presents articles by authors - members or not members of the association - on national and international legal hot topics.

Editor-in-Chief: Barbara Gislason, Minnesota, United States.

== UIA awards ==
UIA also rewards legal professionals for their scientific work, their professionalism, their involvement in the defence of the rule of law or for the innovative aspect of their professional practice.

=== Monique Raynaud-Contamine Award ===
The Monique Raynaud-Contamine Award has been awarded from 1999 to 2018 for the best written reports submitted at the association's annual congresses.

- 1999 : Nelson LANDRY, Canada : Les techniques biométriques d'indentification
- 2000 : Augusto LOPES-CARDOSO, Portugal : Dimension juridique de l'Intervention génétique
- 2001 : Sandra BERBUTO & Christine PEVEE, Belgium : La protection pénale des mineurs en droit belge

Carlo MASTELLONE, Italy : Sales-related issues not covered by the CISG: assignment, set-off, statute of limitation, etc., under Italian law

- 2002 : W. Carter YOUNGER, USA : Employee privacy, electronic communications and workplace monitoring
- 2003 : Sascha R. GROSJEAN, Germany : Protecting trade secrets and commercial information – Rights of employers and employees (Young Lawyer Award)

Stefano DINDO, Italy : How to negotiate a cross-border business deal

- 2004 : Francesca PIZZI, Italy : Economic analysis of personality rights concerning media activities (Young Lawyer Award)

Jorge MARTI MORENO, Spain : Migration of companies within the World Trade Organization, European Union and worldwide

- 2005 : Rosario LEON, Spain : Los principios de precaución y desarrollo sostenible en España (Young Lawyer Award)

Peter TURNER, UK : Ethics in International Arbitration

- 2006 : Felipe ZANCHET MAGALHAES, Brazil : Commercial representation or agency contract : legal implications (Young Lawyer Award)

James MOORE, USA : Economic globalization and its impact upon the legal profession Luis ZARRALUQUI, Spain : El arbitraje en Derecho de Familia en general y en España en particular – La problemática de los procesos en los procesos arbítrales

- 2007 : Raquel AZEVEDO, Portugal : Corporate governance on non-listed companies - Special features in connection with family-run companies (Young Lawyer Award)

Howard H. SPIEGLER, USA : Restitution of nazi-looted art: view from the United States

- 2008 : Gavin LLEWELLYN, UK : The protection of tri-dimensional trade marks: the UK perspective (Young Lawyer Award)

Judith GIBSON, Australia: Detention after sentence

- 2009 : Cristina COJOCARU, Romania : Legal uncertainty in Family Law (Young Lawyer Award)

Carolina PINA, Spain : Copyright in the digital age: from dadaism to mash-up

- 2010 : Makato SHIMADA, Japan : Protection of cultural properties in Japan
- 2011 : Judith GIBSON, Australia : Turning a good newsroom bad: white collar crime, tort and case management issues arising from the UK phone hacking scandal
- 2012 : Christina PHILLIPS, USA : Litigation arising out of natural disasters: a policy examination from the United States (Young Lawyer Award)

Francis GERVAIS, Canada : Qui est le client ?

- 2013 : Motoyasu HIROSE, Japan : Asset prevention Japanese prevention (Young Lawyer Award)

Francisco RAMOS ROMEU, Spain : El embargo internacional de créditos en la UE

- 2014 : Jean-François HENROTTE, Belgium : Application territoriale de la législation européenne en matière de protection des données : vaincre la peur de l’autre
- 2015 : Iñigo GUTIERREZ VELASCO, Spain : Derecho concursal y derecho laboral. El despido colectivo en empresas en crisis: ¿Cierre de empresa o centro de trabajo en el ámbito europeo? (Young Lawyer Award)

Janice MULLIGAN, USA : How would you like your Pacemaker to be hacked? Healthcare cyber vulnerability: a risk management nightmare for the 21st century

Maria CRONIN, UK (Special Mention – Young Lawyer)

- 2016 : Ingrid BOURBONNAIS JACQUARD, France : Les actions directoires contre les assureurs – Le droit d’action directe contre le P&I Club, conception française (Young Lawyer Award)

Ian DE FREITAS, UK : Towards an international regulatory approach for mass surveillance and profiling – Striking the balance between national security and privacy

Barbara BANDIERA, Italy (Special Mention)

- 2017 : Barbara BANDIERA, Italy : Radiography of a project financing for the Implementation of a wind Farm New EU legislative Framework for markets in Financial instruments
- 2018 : Barbara GISLASON, USA : What do the Applications of Gene Editing, Artificial Intelligence and Big Data Brings To The Fields of Life Science, Medical Supply, Food Supply and Environmental Impact?

=== Jacques Leroy Prize ===
From 2010 to 2017, Jacques Leroy Prize was awarded to a law student who, by his or her written submission, promoted the recognition of human rights in the business world.

- 2010 : Angela STONIER, Australia
- 2011 : Josephine WONG, Canada
- 2012 : Somda MANGLOIRE, Burkina Faso
- 2013 : Joel FOX, Israël
- 2014 : Adja CEVC, Slovenia
- 2015 : Jonathas LIMA, Brazil
- 2016 : Serge Théophile BAMBARA, Burkina Faso
- 2017 : Matheus RICCI PORTELLA, Brazil

=== Rule of Law Award ===
Since 2016, UIA, in partnership with LexisNexis, acknowledges and publicises individuals and/or organisations for their commitment and actions to the development and promotion of the Rule of Law.

- 2016 : Malaysian Bar Association, Malaysia
- 2017 : Saidbek NURITDINOV, President of the Union of Advocates of the Republic of Tajikistan, Tajikistan
- 2018 : The Honorable Ruth BADER GINSBURG, Associate Justice of the United States Supreme Court
- 2019 : Bertrand FAVREAU, President of IDHAE, France
- 2020 : ELIL, European Lawyers in Lesvos, Greece
- 2021 : Latifa SHARIFI, Afghanistan

=== LegalTech Inspiration Award ===
In 2021, UIA and LexisNexis launched the LegalTech Inspiration Award in order to encourage innovation in the legal field and reward the organizations or individuals that bring new ideas to the legal world which change lawyers’ outlook, practice or working methods.

- 2021 : Thomas SEEBER, Realest8, Austria
