= Barbara Robinson (producer) =

American film producer

Barbara Robinson (born June 4, 1960) is an American film producer and studio executive who has worked her entire career in greater China. Over the course of three decades, Robinson has worked with many directors from China, Hong Kong, and Taiwan — and played a role in the production of Ang Lee’s martial arts title, Crouching Tiger/Hidden Dragon.

Her films have received awards at the film festivals Cannes, Berlin and Venice and Hong Kong, as well as Oscar, Golden Globe and BAFTA award wins.

She has held positions with Sony Pictures Entertainment, and most recently with Wanda Media, the film and television production and distribution arm of the Wanda Group as adviser to its Los Angeles operations. Robinson is cited on how Chinese and American film companies can collaborate.

In 1998, Barbara Robinson created of the first China-based production unit of an American studio when she joined the Columbia Tristar Motion Picture Group (a Sony Pictures Entertainment company) as Managing Director to establish its local-language film production division, Columbia Pictures Film Production Asia, based in Hong Kong.

Under Robinson, the combination of Sony and local production partners created films that succeeded at the box office both in China and around the world. In this role, she became the first international production partner for the Huayi Brothers, and developed working partnerships with China Film, China Co-Production Company, and other Chinese industry partners and government agencies.

At Sony, she was responsible for Ang Lee’s Crouching Tiger, Hidden Dragon, winner of four Oscars that set records in the United States and around the world with US $230 million in global box office receipts. Robinson was also a driving force behind Stephen Chow’s Kung Fu Hustle.

Earlier in her career, Robinson partnered with Zhang Yimou on his films Raise the Red Lantern (Silver Lion, Venice 1991; Best Foreign Film, BAFTA 1992) and To Live (Grand Jury Prize, Cannes 1994; Best Foreign Film, BAFTA 1995). In 2006 at a CineAsiA ceremony honoring Barbara Robinson, Zhang Yimou said, "[Robinson] played a fundamental role in popularizing Chinese cinema worldwide." Her other Columbia Pictures Film Production credits with Zhang Yimou include: Not One Less (Golden Lion, Venice 1999) and The Road Home (Silver Bear, Berlin 2000).

Robinson was presented with the Sony Corporation CEO Award for Excellence and was also given a Visionary Lifetime Achievement award at the 2006 CineAsia Expo in Beijing.

Robinson is fluent in Mandarin Chinese, and holds a Bachelor of Science degree from Bradley University.
