= David W. Rivkin =

American lawyer

Independent Arbitrator at Arbitration Chambers

Personal details
- Born: 1955 (age 70–71) New York, NY
- Party: Democratic
- Education: Yale University; Yale Law School

David W. Rivkin (born 1955) is an independent arbitrator affiliated with Arbitration Chambers (in New York, London and Hong Kong). In 2015–16, Rivkin served as president of the International Bar Association. For more than 40 years, Mr. Rivkin practiced private and public international law at Debevoise & Plimpton LLP, where he served as co-chair of its International Dispute Resolution Group for more than 20 years and was a founder of its Business Integrity/ESG Group. He now serves as a full-time arbitrator and mediator, focusing on complex international commercial arbitrations and investor-state disputes.

== Early life and career ==
Rivkin graduated from Yale University in 1977 with a B.A., magna cum laude, in history, and received a J.D. from Yale in 1980. From 1980 to 1981, he served as law clerk to the Hon. Luther M. Swygert, U.S. Court of Appeals for the Seventh Circuit.

Rivkin has been ranked in Band 1 of Chambers Global and Chambers USA since their inception. For more than 40 years, Rivkin practiced private and public international law at Debevoise & Plimpton LLP, where he served as co-chair of its International Dispute Resolution Group for more than 20 years and was a founder of its Business Integrity/ESG Group. His practice focused on international arbitration of public law disputes (such as those under bilateral investment treaties), international commercial arbitrations, and transnational litigation in US and foreign courts. Rivkin worked with clients on every continent and on cases involving common law, civil law, Islamic law and other systems. He won one of the largest investment treaty awards ever ($1.2 billion for Occidental Petroleum) and one of the largest ICC awards ever ($750 million for Hyundai Heavy Industries). He also regularly sat as an arbitrator in major international cases.

Chamber Global 2022 identified him as one of the top 10 arbitration practitioners worldwide. Chambers publications have described him as "the best arbitration practitioner anywhere," "a true giant in the field, whose depth of knowledge is incredible," "an accomplished arbitrator" who has demonstrated "aptitude for complex, high-stakes disputes," and "an extraordinarily bright, thoughtful and clear advocate." Rivkin has also routinely received the top recognition in Legal 500, which has praised him as "a brilliant lawyer and tactician" whose "oral advocacy was the best I have ever seen," and in other publications such as Who's Who Legal and Euromoney.

In 2015–16, Rivkin served as president of the International Bar Association, the world's largest global legal organization with membership of more than 100,000 lawyers in more than 170 countries, as well as approximately 200 bar associations and law societies. In that capacity, he led efforts relating to judicial integrity, climate change justice, business and human rights, human trafficking, human rights and the rule of law, and the independence of the legal profession, among others. He was the first American to serve in that role in a quarter century. Previously in the IBA, he served as chair of its Legal Practice Division, which comprises more than 50 business-focused substantive law committees, and chair of its Arbitration Committee, among other positions. In that role, Mr. Rivkin changed the practice of international arbitration by leading the drafting of the original IBA Rules of Evidence and the development of the IBA Guidelines on Conflicts of Interest, among other projects.

In addition, he has held prominent positions in arbitration institutions, government committees and other NGOs across the world. Rivkin worked on initial government efforts to encourage alternative dispute resolution under NAFTA and advised on negotiations to create a worldwide judgments convention, US sanctions policy and nuclear deterrence. He has served in leadership positions in arbitration institutions on virtually every continent. Currently, he is the co-chair of the Hong Kong International Arbitration Centre and on the Council of the International Council for Arbitration in Sport and the Mumbai Centre for International Arbitration and the Court of the MCCI Mediation and Arbitration Centre. In the past, he served, among others, on the London Court of International Arbitration (including as vice president and chair of its North American Users' Council), the Arbitration Institute of the Stockholm Chamber of Commerce (including as vice chair), American Arbitration Association (as a member of its executive committee), the Commission of the ICC Court of Arbitration, and the Singapore International Arbitration Centre. In those positions, he has frequently been involved in the drafting and revising of arbitration rules of these arbitration institutions.

Rivkin has long been an advocate of greater efficiency in international arbitration. As a leader of Debevoise's arbitration practice, he helped develop the firm's Protocol To Promote Efficiency in International Arbitration in 2010. Among other publications and speeches, his influential article Towards a New Paradigm in International Arbitration: The Town Elder Model Revisited (2012) urged arbitrators and counsel to adopt only procedures necessary for each case rather than standardized procedural orders. In 2016, he called for a New Contract Between Arbitrators and Parties, and in 2021 he published the Town Elder Arbitration Rules, designed to facilitate Decision Tree arbitration when it is appropriate.

At the end of 2022, Rivkin retired from Debevoise & Plimpton LLP. He now devotes his practice full-time to serving as an arbitrator in major international cases.
