= Rosemary Verey =

English garden designer (1918–2001)

Rosemary Verey, OBE, VMH (21 December 1918 in Chatham, Kent – 31 May 2001 in Cheltenham) was an English garden designer, lecturer and garden writer who designed the notable garden at Barnsley House, near Cirencester in Gloucestershire, England.

== Life ==
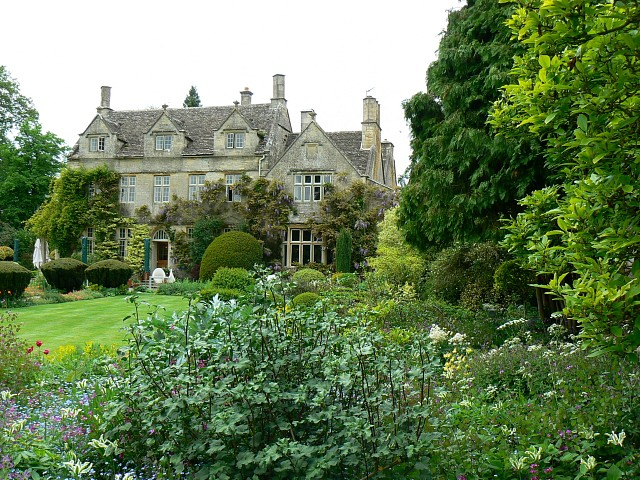
Barnsley House and garden

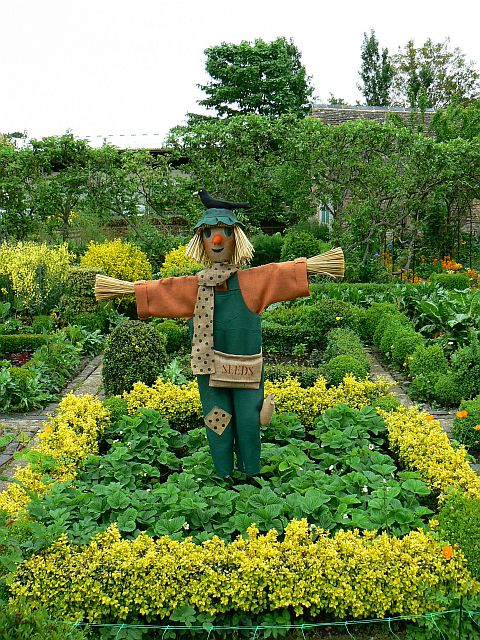
Part of the kitchen garden at Barnsley House

Verey was born Rosemary Isabel Baird Sandilands and educated at Eversley School, Folkestone, and University College London. In 1939 she married David Verey, whose family owned Barnsley House, a Grade II* listed 17th-century house about 4 miles (6 km) north-east of Cirencester.

She was awarded the OBE in 1996, and in 1999 the Victoria Medal of Honour (VMH) from the Royal Horticultural Society, the highest accolade the Society can award.

== Garden design ==
Verey's most significant garden design was that for her own Barnsley House. In 1970, she opened the garden for one day to the public under the National Gardens Scheme; the garden's popularity was such that it would eventually open six days a week to accommodate 30,000 annual visitors.

In 1984, after her husband died, she began designing gardens for American and British clients. She helped plant and develop the gardens of Woodside, Elton John's estate in Berkshire, as well as Prince Charles' Highgrove House in Gloucestershire, and gardens for Princess Michael of Kent, the Marquess of Bute, and the New York Botanical Garden.

Verey took imposing elements from large public gardens and adapted them to scale for home use. Her laburnum walk in Barnsley House garden is an example of this technique, inspired by the large laburnum walk at the National Trust's Bodnant Garden in North Wales. Verey is also noted for reviving the fashion for ornamental kitchen gardens; that at Barnsley House was inspired by the garden at the Château de Villandry on the Loire in France.

== Bibliography ==
- The Englishwoman's Garden . Chatto and Windus, 1980. Hardcover: ISBN 0-7011-2395-8
- The Scented Garden. Marshall Editions 1981. Hardcover: ISBN 0-7181-2050-7
- Classic Garden Design: Adapting and Recreating Garden Features of the Past . Viking, 1984. Hardcover: ISBN 0-670-80063-5
- The New Englishwoman's Garden . Co-authored by Alvilde Lees-Milne. Chatto and Windus, 1987. Hardcover: ISBN 0-7011-3273-6
- The Flower Arranger's Garden . Conran Octopus, 1992, ISBN 1-85029-322-8
- Good Planting. Frances Lincoln Publishers, 1990. Hardcover: ISBN 0-7112-0606-6
- The Art of Planting. Photographs by Andrew Lawson. Little, Brown and Company, 1990. Hardcover: ISBN 978-0316899765
- A Countrywoman's Notes. Foreword by HRH Charles, Prince of Wales. London: Frances Lincoln Publishers, 1993. Miniature edition. Hardcover: ISBN 0-7112-0888-3, ISBN 978-0-7112-0888-9.
- Rosemary Verey's Good Planting Plans. Little Brown and Company, 1993. Hardcover: ISBN 0-316-89982-8
- Secret Gardens: Revealed by Their Owners Chosen and Edited by Rosemary Verey. Bulfinch Press, 1994. Hardcover: ISBN 0-8212-2074-8
- Rosemary Verey's English Country Gardens . Henry Holt & Co, 1996. Hardcover: ISBN 0-8050-5080-9
- The English Country Garden . BBC Books, 1996. Hardcover: ISBN 0-563-38705-X
- Rosemary Verey's Making of a Garden. Frances Lincoln Publishers, 2001. Photographs by Tony Lord. Plans rendered in watercolour by Hilary Wills. New York: Paperback: ISBN 0-7112-1791-2
- The Garden in Winter. Frances Lincoln Publishers, 2002. Paperback: ISBN 0-7112-2020-4
- A Countrywoman's Year by Rosemary Verey. First US edition, hard cover. ((Little, Brown and Company, 1989. ISBN 0-316-89977-1
