= Museum of Food and Drink =

Museum in New York City, New York, U.S.

Coordinates: 40.718934°N 73.949604°W

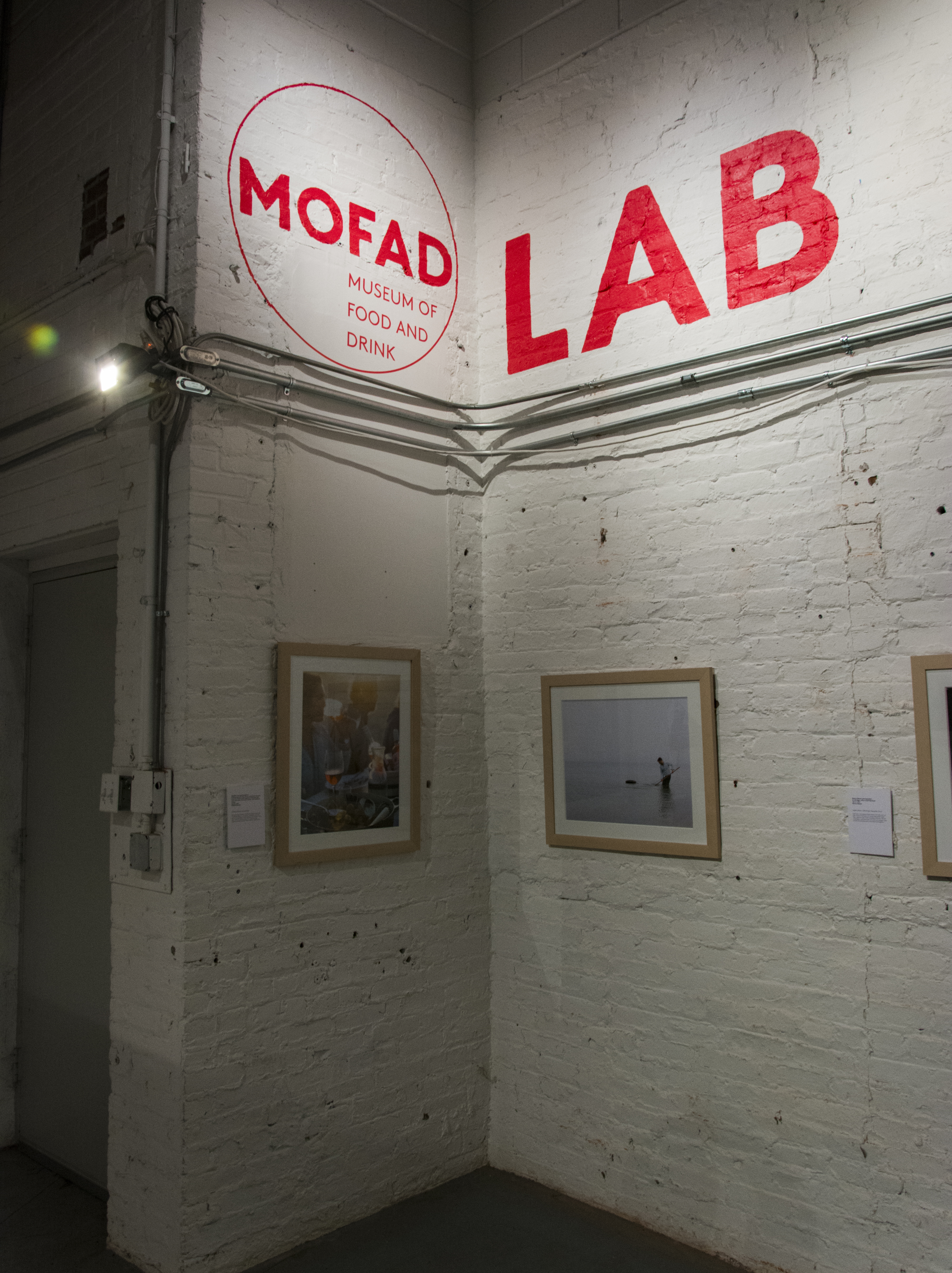
MOFAD Lab in Williamsburg

The Museum of Food and Drink (MOFAD) is a New York City educational non-profit and museum that seeks to change the way people think about food and drink. The museum's work explores "the ways food and beverage impact our culture, politics, economy, history, and more."

== History ==
Dave Arnold founded and chartered the museum in 2005, but it remained an idea until 2011. In 2013, Arnold and museum Executive Director Peter Kim raised over $100,000 through a Kickstarter campaign for the museum's first exhibition.

The first exhibit, which debuted in New York in August 2013, was the result of the campaign: a 3,200 pound puffing machine, also called a puff gun. The puffing machine is part of a cereal-focused traveling exhibit.

In 2015, the museum gained the support of its first major sponsor, Infiniti, which helped fund a space for their first series of exhibitions. That space became known as MOFAD Lab, a 5,000-square-foot gallery space in Williamsburg, Brooklyn.

Before the COVID-19 pandemic caused a shutdown of museums in New York City, including the MOFAD Lab, MOFAD announced a new exhibition entitled African/American: Making the Nation's Table, exhibited at the Africa Center's Aliko Dangote Hall in Harlem, NYC. The museum held a series of public programs during the shutdown, and the exhibit ultimately opened in February 2022 and included the Ebony Test Kitchen.

In February 2024, MOFAD opened its doors to the public once more at its new location in the Empire Stores building in the DUMBO neighborhood of Brooklyn. MOFAD's inaugural exhibit, Flavor: The World to your Brain, is an interactive sensory exhibition exploring the many aspects of how people experience flavor, a look at the flavor industry, and an examination of what natural and artificial flavor really mean.

== Gallery ==
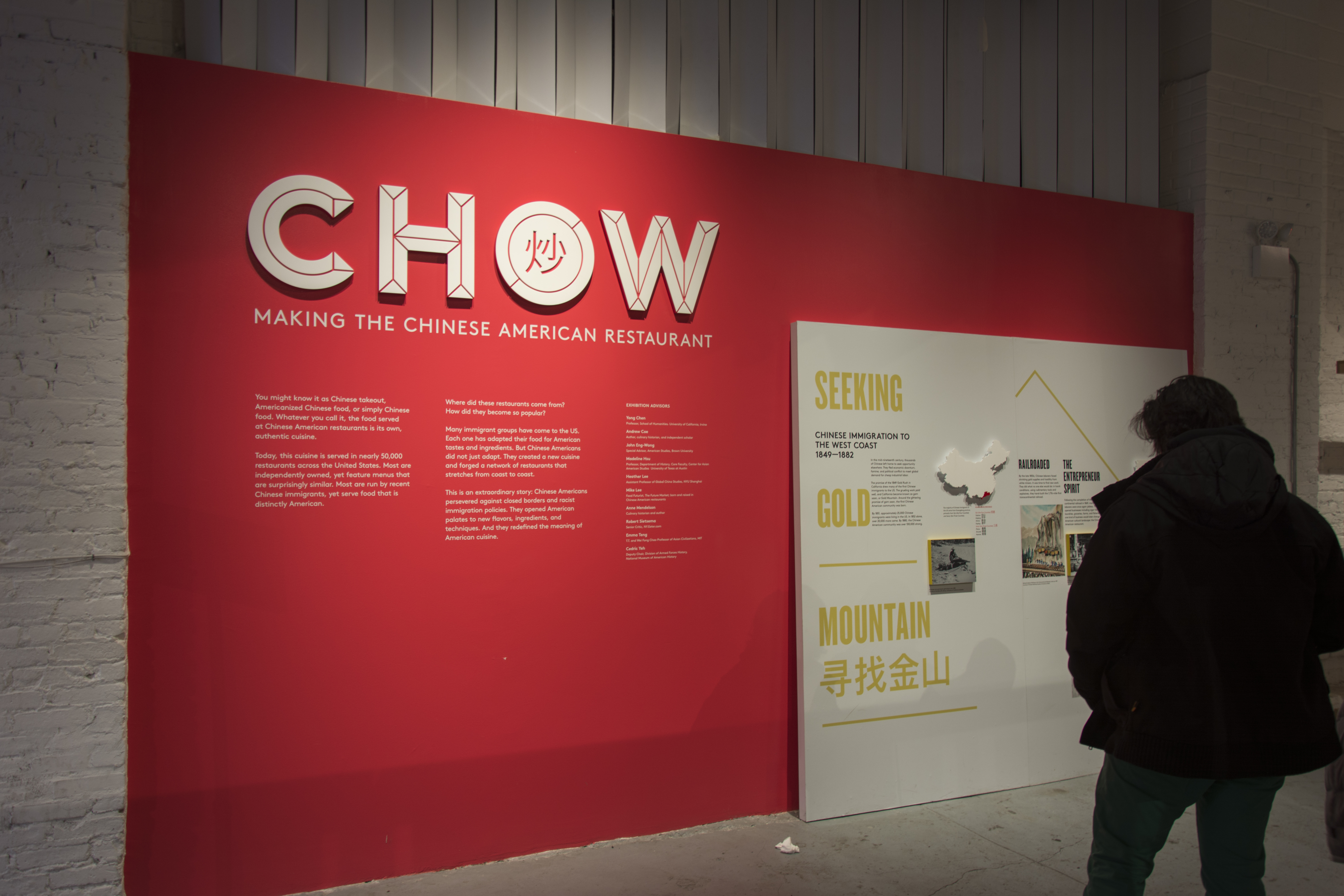
Chow, an exhibit at MOFAD Lab in 2018

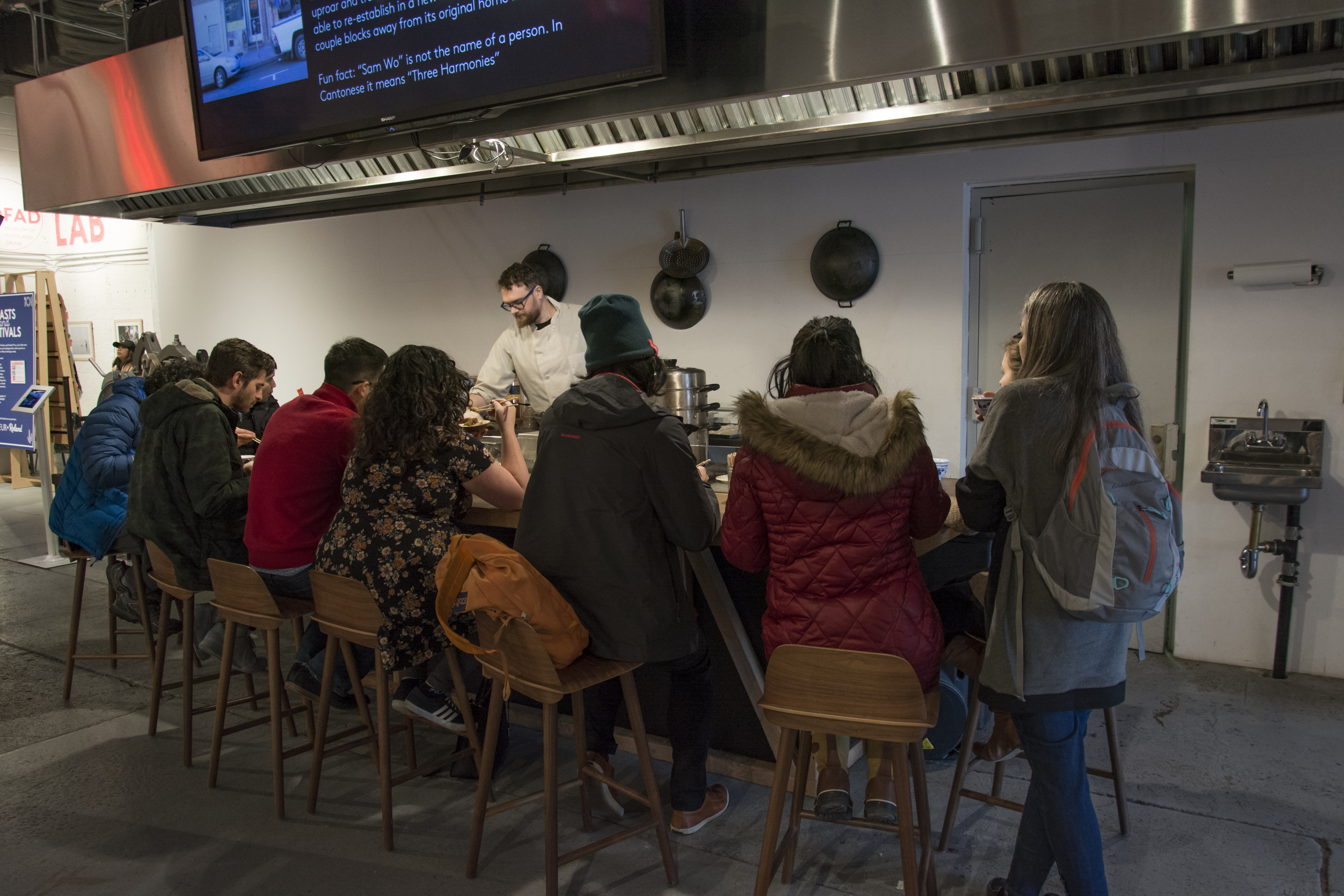
Tasting bar

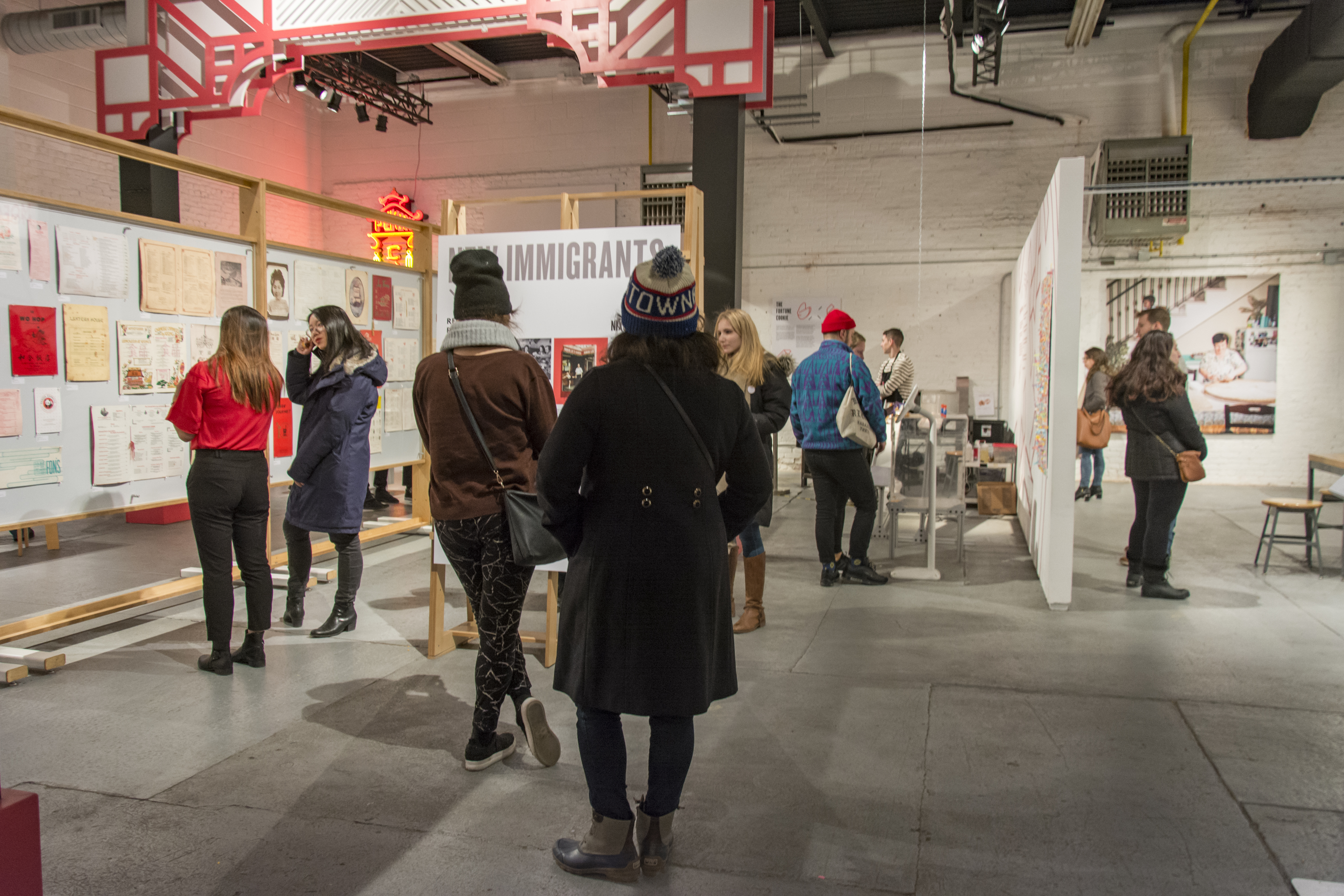
Guests at the exhibit
