= Barnsley Park =

Country house in Gloucestershire, England

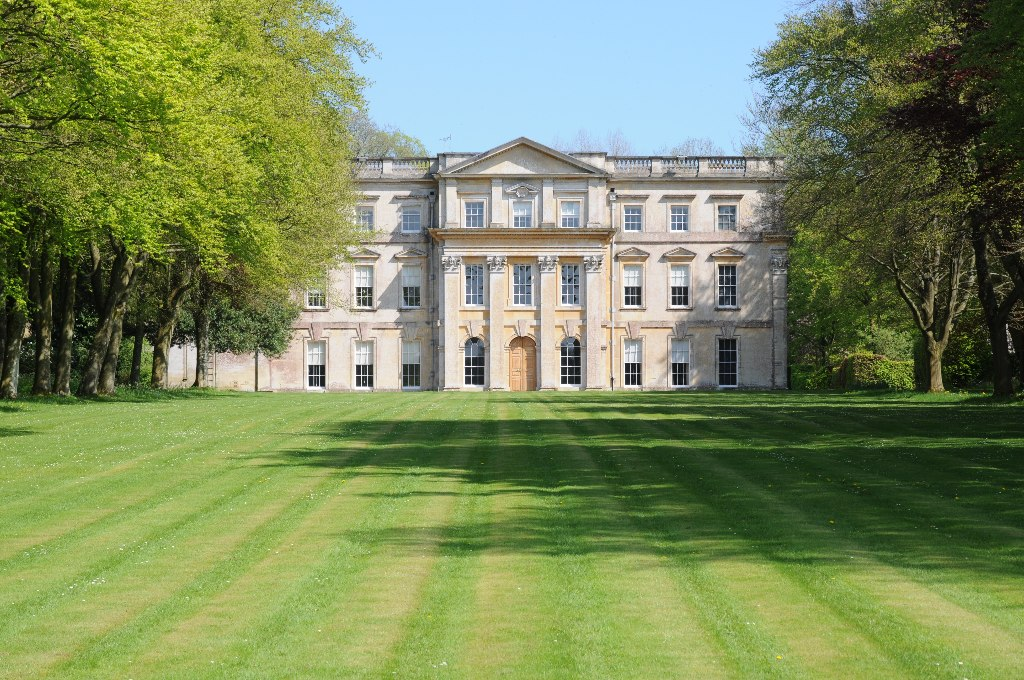
- The west front of Barnsley Park

- Location within Gloucestershire
- 51°45′6″N 1°52′46″W

History
- Built: 1720s

Site notes
- Architectural style: Georgian Baroque architecture

Listed Building – Grade I
- Official name: Barnsley Park
- Designated: 4 June 1952
- Reference no.: 1155256

Scheduled monument
- Official name: Roman villa and associated field system, Barnsley Park
- Designated: 4 December 1951
- Reference no.: 1012777

Barnsley Park is a country house and park, measuring about 3 miles (4.8 km) in circumference in Barnsley, Gloucestershire, England.

== History ==
An Iron Age settlement was once situated within Barnsley Park, and upon the Roman invasion, a 33-metre (108 ft) long Roman villa was built at the settlement to the north of the current house.

In 1693, the estate was inherited by Brereton Bourchier who started the construction of the present house. His daughter, Martha, married Henry Perrot the member of parliament for Oxfordshire from 1721 to 1740, who completed the house during the 1720s. The architect is not known although several authors have speculated about who was responsible.

The house was redecorated around 1780 by Anthony Keck, with further work by John Nash, including the library and conservatory, around 1811. The landscaped garden was laid out in the 18th century and has mature hardwood trees. In 1794 the parkland was extended by diverting the road to Ablington.

By 1819, the estate was owned by Sir James Musgrave. In 1935, the Wykeham-Musgraeves sold Barnsley Park to Lady Violet Henderson: it remains in the Henderson family.

== Architecture ==
The Georgian Baroque three-storey house has a west front of nine bays with a central door with pediments. The east front has seven bays. The interior is decorated with extensive plastrework, particularly on the staircase and halls.

The extensive grounds and parkland include several subsidiary buildings. The gatehouse built by John Nash around 1810 is now known as Pepper-pot Lodge, another lodge was added in the mid 19th century. Nash was also responsible for the orangery 10 metres (33 ft) east of the house. It has a slate roof supported by ionic columns.

The stable block and coach houses were added in the early 19th century. These are now used as six workshops for small businesses.

The estate has its own pumping house which was constructed in the late 19th century, and a large 18th century barn. There is also an 18th-century dovecote, and a range of cottages originally built for the workers but now rented out.

The formal gardens, close to the house, are divided by hedges laid out in the 1960s. Further from the house are plantations primarily made of beech trees but with some specimen planting including Wellingtonia. Other trees planted in the park include silver birch, and mixed deciduous and coniferous species The east lawn provides a Patte d'oie which acts as a focal point of several drives through the grounds. The walled kitchen garden is 100 metres (330 ft) long and 70 metres (230 ft) wide. It includes a 40-metre (130 ft) long glasshouse.
