= Centre for Advanced Migration Studies =

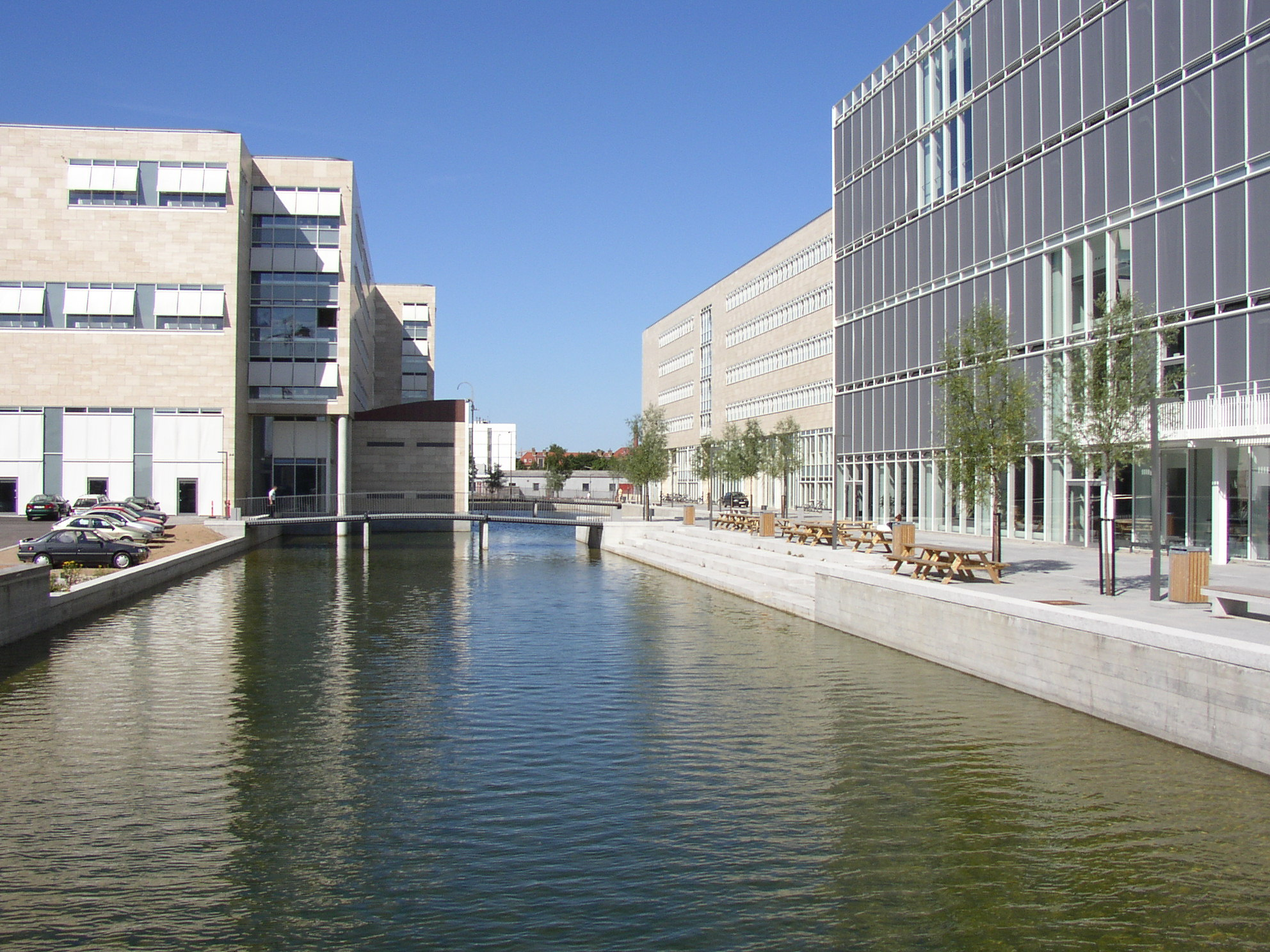
- The Faculty of Humanities on Amager
- Established: c. 2013
- Affiliations: University of Copenhagen
- Academic staff: 130
- Postgraduates: 70
- Doctoral students: c. 3
- Location: Copenhagen, Denmark
- Director: Dr. Marie Sandberg

The Centre for Advanced Migration Studies (AMIS), is a research centre at the University of Copenhagen in Denmark. It engages in interdisciplinary research and postgraduate teaching concerning human migration. The centre is part of a growing trend in recognizing migration studies as a distinct field of academic research.

== Courses ==
The Centre provides postgraduate research training to approximately 70 students. This includes training in advanced research methods, teaching on social theory, fieldwork, and personal supervision. It hosts a Master of Arts (Cand.mag.) in Advanced Migration Studies, an interdisciplinary 2-year course. The MA programme trains graduate students to understand the diverse field of human migration, and addresses social policy, integration, diversity management, intercultural exchanges, and border studies. The programme combines academic approaches from the humanities and the social sciences. The Centre also hosts students pursuing a PhD in migration issues.

== Organisation ==
For administrative purposes, the centre is officially part of the SAXO Institute, which is in turn a division within the faculty of humanities. For teaching purposes, nine lecturers are currently part of the centre. There are approximately 70 centre affiliates, and five visiting scholars. The centre also maintains close links with Malmö University, Aalborg University, Roskilde University, and the Danish Institute for International Studies because of their own respective research and teaching focuses on international migration. Multiple staff members hold joint appointments at these other organisations.

=== Aims ===
The centre's official aims are as follows:

- To facilitate cooperation among researchers who work on issues of migration,
- To stimulate national and international research cooperation on migration, and hosting talks, seminars and conferences,
- To address issues concerning immigration and integration for which there is significant societal interest,
- To provide a forum in which research projects and papers can be developed, discussed and improved.

== History ==
The Migration Initiative at the University of Copenhagen predates the centre, and was an interdisciplinary research network with participation from six separate faculties: anthropology, geography, intercultural and regional studies, media and communication, public health, and psychology. It organised seminars, lecture series, courses, and workshops. It had three central themes: "migration, mobility and networks in a globalized perspective", "affiliation and cultural variation", and "social relations and institutions in everyday life" In spring 2009, the Migration Initiative, in conjunction with the department of anthropology, offered undergraduate and graduate level courses in cross-disciplinary approaches to migration. This combined scholarship from anthropology, political science, philosophy, law, health, psychology, socio-linguistics, religion, cultural studies, economics and geography. At this time, teaching was based at City Campus. In January 2010, the Danish Research Centre for Migration, Ethnicity and Health was founded as a separate organisation which remains based as City Campus. The Centre for Advanced Migration Studies was then inaugurated in 2013. The centre's first director was Nils Holtug (2013-2019), a professor of philosophy. He was then succeeded by Marie Sandberg in 2019, her research focuses on European borders.

== Media coverage ==
The centre is routinely sought for comment regarding migration issues both in Europe, and in Scandinavia specifically. The centre has been featured in Time magazine, The Local, Videnskab, DR, Slate, Channel 4, and Politiken.

== Location ==
AMIS is based at the University of Copenhagen's South Campus, on the island of Amager in the northernmost part of Ørestad. This is also the location of the University's Faculty of Humanities, Faculty of Theology and the Faculty of Law. Islands Brygge Station is located nearby.
