= Effects of immigration to the United States =

Immigration to the United States has had effects on the demographics, economy and culture of the country. As of June 2025, the United States had more than 50 million immigrants—the highest in a country globally—making up an estimated 15.4% of the workforce.

== Demographics ==
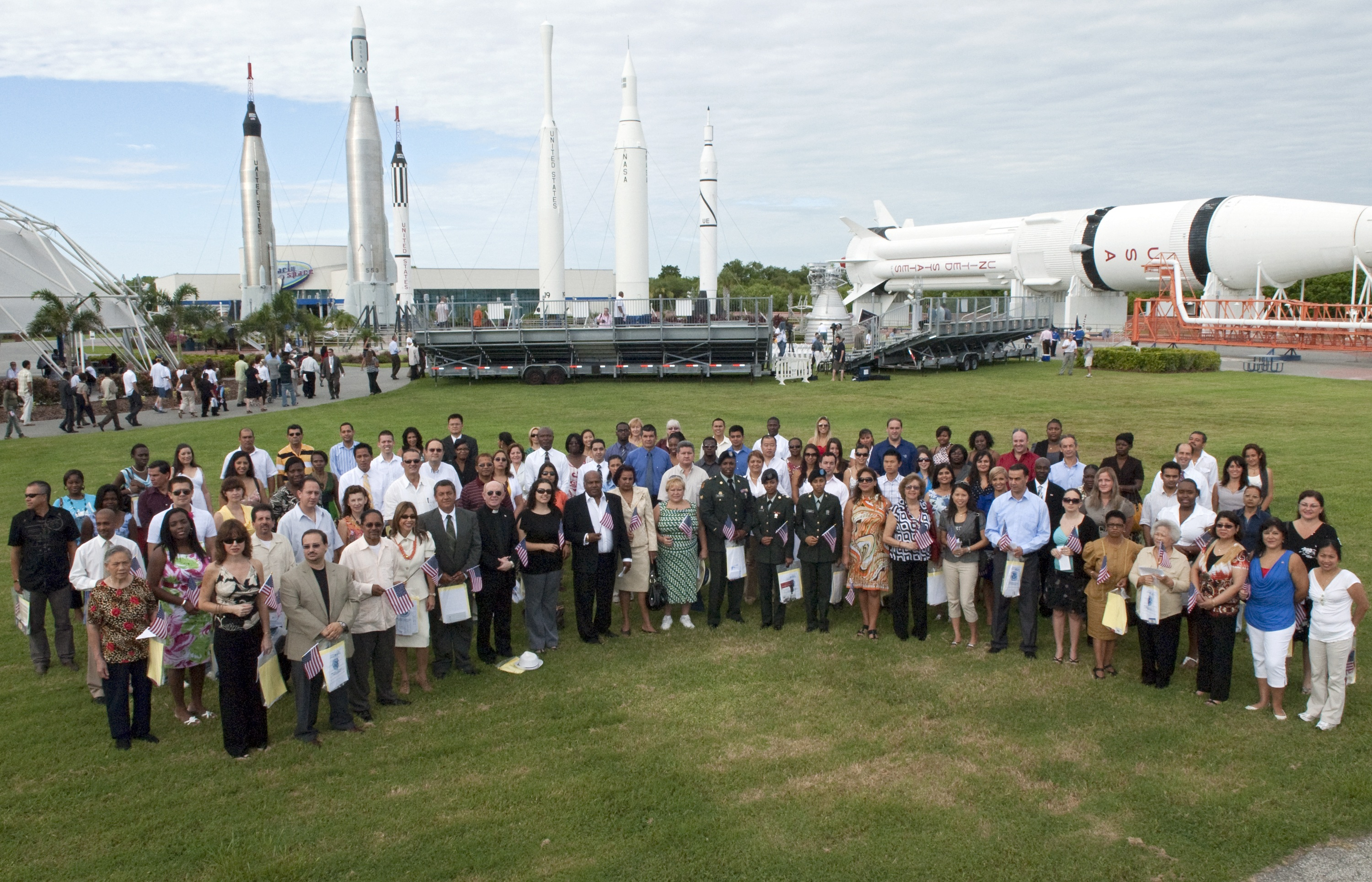
Naturalization ceremony, Kennedy Space Center, 2010

In 2015, the United States Census Bureau estimated that the U.S. population would increase from 317 million in 2014 to 417 million by 2060, and nearly 20% of people living in the United States are projected to be foreign-born. A 2015 report from the Pew Research Center projects that by 2065, non-Hispanic white people will account for 46% of the population, down from the 2005 figure of 67%. Non-Hispanic white people made up 85% of the population in 1960. It also predicts the population of Hispanic people increasing from 17% in 2014 to 29% by 2060. The population of Asian people is expected to nearly double by 2060. Overall, the Pew report predicts the population of the United States will rise from 296 million in 2005 to 441 million by 2065. The population is projected to only increase to 338 million if no immigration is permitted, according to the Pew report. The U.S. has issued 140,000 green cards each year for employment-based immigration, with European immigrants receiving 65% of the cards. More than half of the European immigrants in 2013 came from legal and labor status.

=== Religion ===
Immigration from South Asia, Africa, and elsewhere has contributed to diversifying the religious composition of the United States. Islam, Hinduism, Buddhism, and Sikhism have grown due to this immigration. Non-Christians together constitute only 4% of the U.S. population, yet they made up 20% of the 2003 cohort of new immigrants. Between 1992 and 2012, an estimated 1.7 million Muslims, 1 million Hindus, and 1 million Buddhists immigrated legally to the United States.

Conversely, a 2011 study found that non-religious people are underrepresented in the immigrant population. Although 'other' non-Christian religions are also slightly more common among immigrants than among U.S. adults—1.9% compared with 1.0%—those professing no religion are slightly under-represented among new immigrants. While 12% of immigrants said they had no religion, the figure was 15% for adult Americans. This lack of representation for non-religious people could be related to stigmas around atheists and agnostics, or could relate to the need for identity when entering a new country. Studies found that immigrants entering a new country were more likely to have a religious affiliation because their affiliation gives them a connection to a familiar group, providing a sense of community in a new country.

=== Demographic data ===
Country of birth for the foreign-born population in the United States
| Top ten countries | 1990 | 2000 | 2010 | 2019 |
|---|---|---|---|---|
| Mexico | 4,298,014 | 9,177,487 | 11,711,103 | 10,931,939 |
| India | 450,406 | 1,022,552 | 1,780,322 | 2,688,075 |
| China (Note: Including Hong Kong, excluding Taiwan (Republic of China).) | 921,070 | 1,518,652 | 2,166,526 | 2,481,699 |
| Philippines | 912,674 | 1,369,070 | 1,777,588 | 2,045,248 |
| El Salvador | 465,433 | 817,336 | 1,214,049 | 1,412,101 |
| Vietnam | 543,262 | 988,174 | 1,240,542 | 1,383,779 |
| Cuba | 736,971 | 872,716 | 1,104,679 | 1,359,990 |
| Dominican Republic | 347,858 | 687,677 | 879,187 | 1,169,420 |
| Guatemala | 225,739 | 480,665 | 830,824 | 1,111,495 |
| South Korea | 568,397 | 864,125 | 1,100,422 | 1,038,885 |
| All of Latin America | 8,407,837 | 16,086,974 | 21,224,087 | |
| All Immigrants | 19,767,316 | 31,107,889 | 39,955,854 | 44,932,799 |

Source: 1990, 2000 and 2010 decennial Censuses and 2019 American Community Survey

== Economic ==
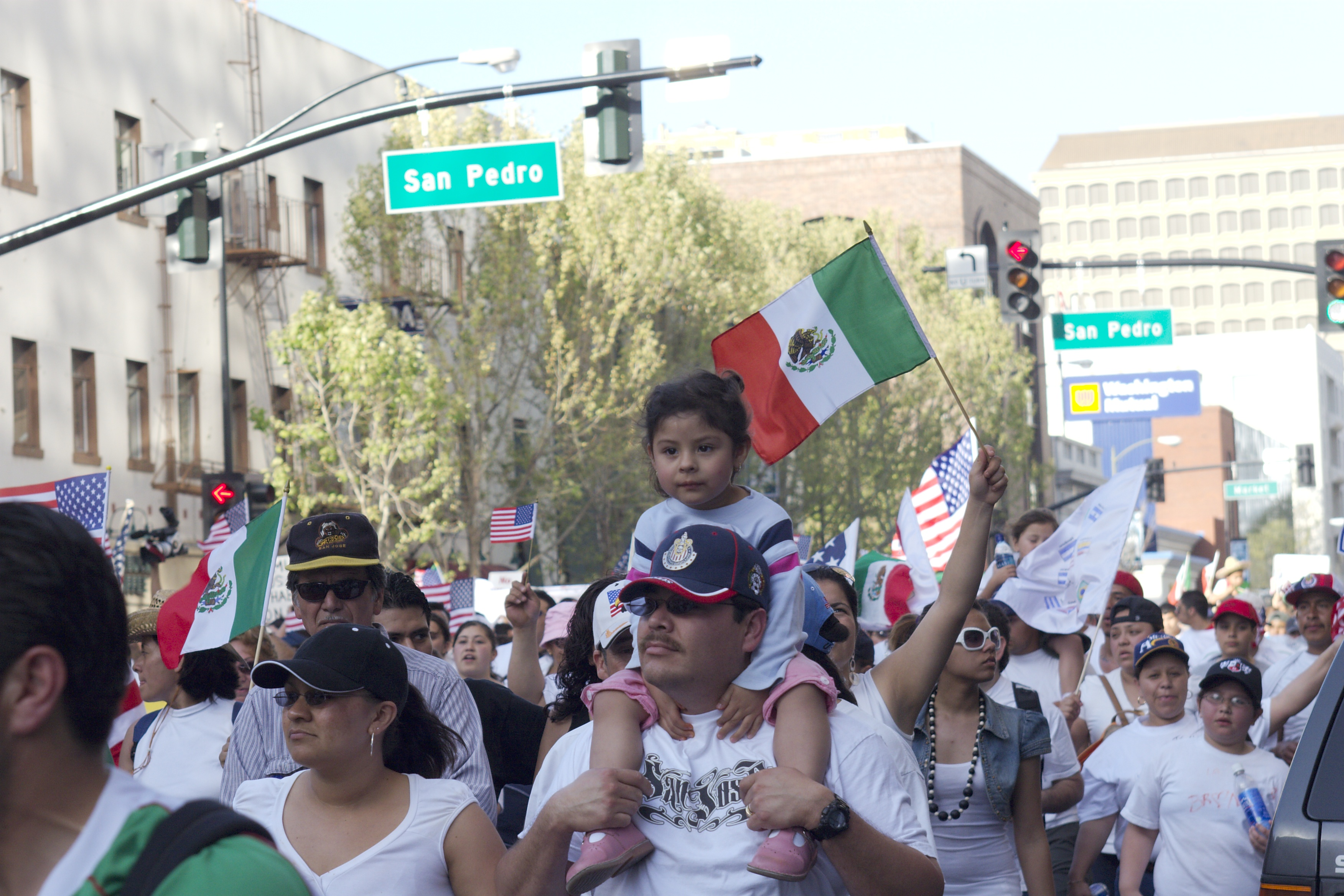
Mexican immigrants march for more rights in San Jose (2006).

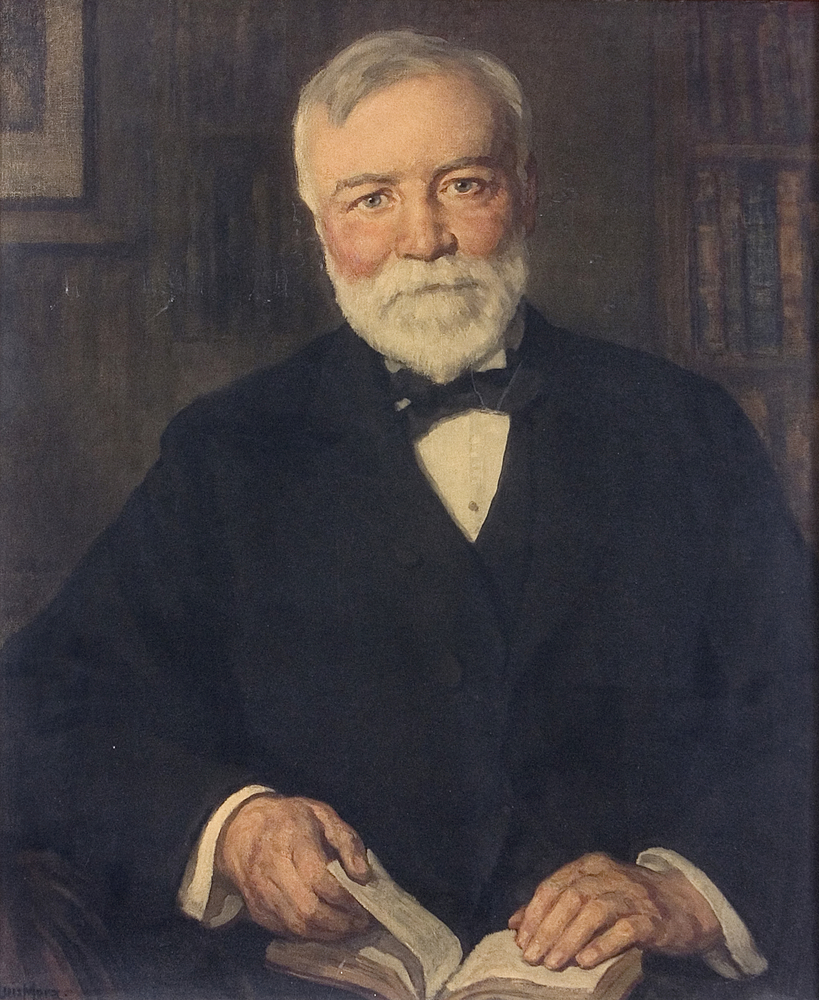
Scottish immigrant Andrew Carnegie led the enormous expansion of the American steel industry in the late 19th century.

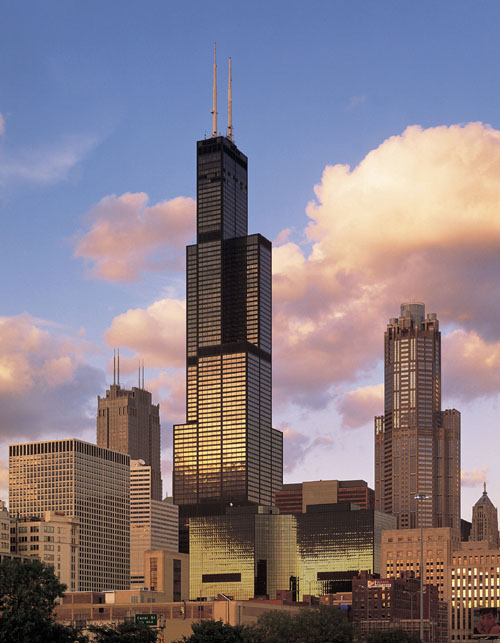
Bangladeshi immigrant Fazlur Rahman Khan was responsible for the engineering design of Sears Tower (now Willis Tower), the tallest building in the world until 1998.

A survey of leading economists shows a consensus for the view that high-skilled immigration gives the average American less work. A survey of the same economists also shows strong support for the notion that low-skilled immigration makes the average American better off. According to David Card, Christian Dustmann, and Ian Preston, "most existing studies of the economic impacts of immigration suggest these impacts are small, and on average benefit the native population." In a survey of the existing literature, Örn B Bodvarsson and Hendrik Van den Berg wrote, "a comparison of the evidence from all the studies... makes it clear that, with very few exceptions, there is no strong statistical support for the view held by many members of the public, namely that immigration has an adverse effect on native-born workers in the destination country."

=== Overall economic impacts ===
Whereas the impact on the average native tends to be small and positive, studies show more mixed results for low-skilled natives, with both positive and negative effects, but still tending to be small. Research has also found that migration leads to greater trade in goods and services.

Immigrants may often do types of work that natives are largely unwilling to do, contributing to greater economic prosperity for the economy as a whole: for instance, Mexican migrant workers taking up manual farm work in the United States has close to zero effect on native employment in that occupation, which means that the effect of Mexican workers on U.S. employment outside farm work was therefore most likely positive, since they raised overall economic productivity. Research indicates that immigrants are more likely to work in risky jobs than U.S.-born workers, partly due to differences in average characteristics, such as immigrants' lower English language ability and educational attainment. Further, some studies indicate that higher ethnic concentration in metropolitan areas is positively related to the probability of self-employment of immigrants.

Research also suggests that diversity has a net positive effect on productivity and economic prosperity. A study by Nathan Nunn, Nancy Qian and Sandra Sequeira found that the Age of Mass Migration (1850–1920) has had substantially beneficial long-term effects on U.S. economic prosperity: "locations with more historical immigration today have higher incomes, less poverty, less unemployment, higher rates of urbanization, and greater educational attainment. The long-run effects appear to arise from the persistence of sizeable short-run benefits, including earlier and more intensive industrialization, increased agricultural productivity, and more innovation." The authors also found that the immigration had short-term benefits: "that there is no evidence that these long-run benefits come at short-run costs. In fact, immigration immediately led to economic benefits that took the form of higher incomes, higher productivity, more innovation, and more industrialization."

Using 130 years of data on historical migrations to the United States, one study found "that a doubling of the number of residents with ancestry from a given foreign country, relative to the mean, increases (by 4.2 percentage points) the probability that at least one local firm invests in that country, and increases (by 31%) the number of employees at domestic recipients of FDI from that country. The size of these effects increases with the ethnic diversity of the local population, the geographic distance to the origin country, and the ethno-linguistic fractionalization of the origin country.."

Some research suggests that immigration can offset some of the adverse effects of automation on native labor outcomes in the United States. By increasing overall demand, immigrants could push natives out of low-skilled manual labor into better-paying occupations. A 2018 study in the American Economic Review found that the Bracero program (which allowed almost half a million Mexican workers to do seasonal farm labor in the United States) did not have any adverse impact on the labor market outcomes of American-born farm workers.

Overall immigration has not had much effect on native wage inequality, but low-skill immigration has been linked to greater income inequality in the native population.

=== Fiscal effects ===
A 2011 literature review of the economic impacts of immigration found that the net fiscal impact of migrants varies across studies but that the most credible analyses typically find small and positive fiscal effects on average. According to the authors, "the net social impact of an immigrant over his or her lifetime depends substantially and in predictable ways on the immigrant's age at arrival, education, reason for migration, and similar." A 2016 report by the National Academies of Sciences, Engineering, and Medicine concluded that over a 75-year time horizon, "the fiscal impacts of immigrants are generally positive at the federal level and generally negative at the state and local level." The reason for the costs to state and local governments is that the cost of educating the immigrants' children is paid by state and local governments. According to a 2007 literature review by the Congressional Budget Office, "Over the past two decades, most efforts to estimate the fiscal impact of immigration in the United States have concluded that, in aggregate and over the long-term, tax revenues of all types generated by immigrants—both legal and unauthorized—exceed the cost of the services they use."

According to James Smith, a senior economist at Santa Monica-based RAND Corporation and lead author of the United States National Research Council's study "The New Americans: Economic, Demographic, and Fiscal Effects of Immigration," immigrants contribute as much as $10 billion to the U.S. economy each year. The NRC report found that although immigrants, especially those from Latin America, caused a net loss in terms of taxes paid versus social services received, immigration can provide an overall gain to the domestic economy due to an increase in pay for higher-skilled workers, lower prices for goods and services produced by immigrant labor, and more efficiency and lower wages for some owners of capital. The report also notes that although immigrant workers compete with domestic workers for low-skilled jobs, some immigrants specialize in activities that otherwise would not exist in an area, and thus can be beneficial for all domestic residents.

Immigration and foreign labor documentation fees increased over 80% in 2007, with over 90% of funding for USCIS derived from immigration application fees, creating many USCIS jobs involving immigration to the US, such as immigration interview officials, fingerprint processors, Department of Homeland Security, etc.

=== Impact of undocumented immigrants ===
Research on the economic effects of undocumented immigrants is scant but existing peer-reviewed studies suggest that the effects are positive for the native population and public coffers. A 2015 study shows that "increasing deportation rates and tightening border control weakens low-skilled labor markets, increasing unemployment of native low-skilled workers. Legalization, instead, decreases the unemployment rate of low-skilled natives and increases income per native." Studies show that legalization of undocumented immigrants would boost the U.S. economy; a 2013 study found that granting legal status to undocumented immigrants would raise their incomes by a quarter (increasing U.S. GDP by approximately $1.4 trillion over a ten-year period), and a 2016 study found that "legalization would increase the economic contribution of the unauthorized population by about 20%, to 3.6% of private-sector GDP."

A 2007 literature by the Congressional Budget Office found that estimating the fiscal effects of undocumented immigrants has proven difficult: "currently available estimates have significant limitations; therefore, using them to determine an aggregate effect across all states would be difficult and prone to considerable error." The impact of undocumented immigrants differs on federal levels than state and local levels, with research suggesting modest fiscal costs at the state and local levels but with substantial fiscal gains at the federal level.

In 2009, a study by the Cato Institute, a free-market think tank, found that legalization of low-skilled illegal resident workers in the US would result in a net increase in US GDP of $180 billion over ten years. The Cato Institute study did not examine the impact on per capita income for most Americans. Jason Riley notes that because of progressive income taxation, in which the top 1% of earners pay 37% of federal income taxes (even though they actually pay a lower tax percentage based on their income), 60% of Americans collect more in government services than they pay in, which also reflects on immigrants. In any event, the typical immigrant and their children will pay a net $80,000 more in their lifetime than they collect in government services, according to the NAS. Legal immigration policy is set to maximize net taxation. Illegal immigrants, even after an amnesty, tend to be recipients of more services than they pay in taxes. In 2010, an econometrics study by a Rutgers economist found that immigration helped increase bilateral trade when the incoming people were connected via networks to their country of origin, particularly boosting trade of final goods as opposed to intermediate goods, but that the trade benefit weakened when the immigrants became assimilated into American culture.

According to NPR in 2005, about 3% of illegal immigrants were working in agriculture. The H-2A visa allows U.S. employers to bring foreign nationals to the United States to fill temporary agricultural jobs. The passing of tough immigration laws in several states from around 2009 provides a number of practical case studies. The state of Georgia passed immigration law HB 87 in 2011; this led, according to the coalition of top Kansas businesses, to 50% of its agricultural produce being left to rot in the fields, at a cost to the state of more than $400 million. Overall losses caused by the act were $1 billion; it was estimated that the figure would become over $20 billion if all the estimated 325,000 unauthorized workers left Georgia. The cost to Alabama of its crackdown in June 2011 has been estimated at almost $11 billion, with up to 80,000 unauthorized immigrant workers leaving the state.

=== Impact of refugees ===
Studies of refugees' impact on native welfare are scant, but the existing literature shows a positive fiscal impact and mixed results (negative, positive, and no significant effects) on native welfare. A 2017 paper by Evans and Fitzgerald found that refugees to the United States pay "$21,000 more in taxes than they receive in benefits over their first 20 years in the U.S." An internal study by the Department of Health and Human Services under the Trump administration, which was suppressed and not shown to the public, found that refugees to the United States brought in $63 billion more in government revenues than they cost the government. According to labor economist Giovanni Peri, the existing literature suggests that there are no economic reasons why the American labor market could not easily absorb 100,000 Syrian refugees in a year. Refugees integrate more slowly into host countries' labor markets than labor migrants, in part due to the loss and depreciation of human capital and credentials during the asylum procedure.

=== Innovation and entrepreneurship ===
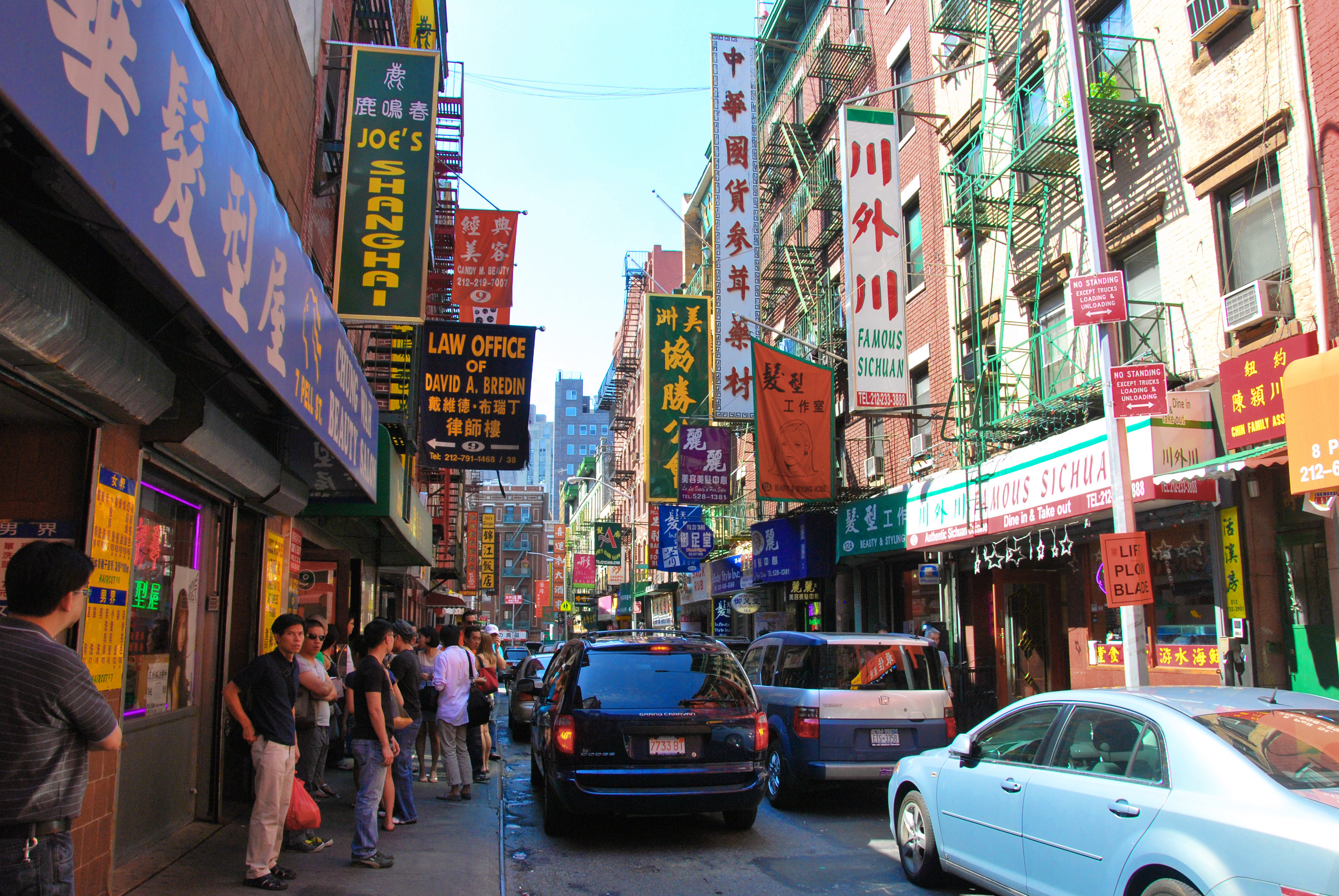
Garment factories in Manhattan's Chinatown

According to one survey of the existing economic literature, "much of the existing research points towards positive net contributions by immigrant entrepreneurs." Areas where immigrants are more prevalent in the United States have substantially more innovation (as measured by patenting and citations). Immigrants to the United States start businesses at higher rates than natives. According to a 2018 paper, "first-generation immigrants create about 25% of new firms in the United States, but this share exceeds 40% in some states." Another 2018 paper links H-1B visa holders to innovation.

Immigrants have been linked to greater invention and innovation in the US. According to one report, "immigrants have started more than half (44 of 87) of America's startup companies valued at $1 billion or more and are key members of management or product development teams in over 70 percent (62 of 87) of these companies." Foreign doctoral students are a major source of innovation in the American economy. In the United States, immigrant workers hold a disproportionate share of jobs in science, technology, engineering, and math (STEM): "In 2013, foreign-born workers accounted for 19.2 percent of STEM workers with a bachelor's degree, 40.7 percent of those with a master's degree, and more than half—54.5 percent—of those with a PhD." The Kauffman Foundation's index of entrepreneurial activity is nearly 40% higher for immigrants than for natives. Immigrants were involved in the founding of many prominent American high-tech companies, such as Google, Yahoo, YouTube, Sun Microsystems, and eBay. Organizations like Renaissance Philanthropy are involved in increasing immigration of STEM workers to the United States.

=== Labor unions ===
The American Federation of Labor (AFL), a coalition of labor unions formed in the 1880s, vigorously opposed unrestricted immigration from Europe for moral, cultural, and racial reasons. The issue unified the workers who feared that an influx of new workers would flood the labor market and lower wages. Nativism was not a factor because upwards of half the union members were themselves immigrants or the sons of immigrants from Ireland, Germany, and Britain. However, nativism was a factor when the AFL even more strenuously opposed all immigration from Asia because it represented (to its Euro-American members) an alien culture that could not be assimilated into American society. The AFL intensified its opposition after 1906 and was instrumental in passing immigration restriction bills from the 1890s to the 1920s, such as the 1921 Emergency Quota Act and the Immigration Act of 1924, and seeing that they were strictly enforced. Mink (1986) concluded that the AFL and the Democratic Party were linked partly on the basis of immigration issues, noting the large corporations, which supported the Republicans, wanted more immigration to augment their labor force.

United Farm Workers during Cesar Chavez tenure was committed to restricting immigration. Chavez and Dolores Huerta, cofounder and president of the UFW, fought the Bracero Program that existed from 1942 to 1964. Their opposition stemmed from their belief that the program undermined U.S. workers and exploited the migrant workers. Since the Bracero Program ensured a constant supply of cheap immigrant labor for growers, immigrants could not protest any infringement of their rights, lest they be fired and replaced. Their efforts contributed to Congress ending the Bracero Program in 1964. In 1973, the UFW was one of the first labor unions to oppose proposed employer sanctions that would have prohibited hiring illegal immigrants.

On a few occasions, concerns that illegal immigrant labor would undermine UFW strike campaigns led to a number of controversial events, which the UFW describes as anti-strikebreaking events, but which have also been interpreted as being anti-immigrant. In 1973, Chavez and members of the UFW marched through the Imperial and Coachella Valleys to the border of Mexico to protest growers' use of illegal immigrants as strikebreakers. Joining him on the march were Reverend Ralph Abernathy and U.S. Senator Walter Mondale. In its early years, the UFW and Chavez went so far as to report illegal immigrants who served as strikebreaking replacement workers (as well as those who refused to unionize) to the Immigration and Naturalization Service.

In 1973, the United Farm Workers set up a "wet line" along the United States–Mexico border to prevent Mexican immigrants from entering the United States illegally and potentially undermining the UFW's unionization efforts. During one such event, in which Chavez was not involved, some UFW members, under the guidance of Chavez's cousin Manuel, physically attacked the strikebreakers after peaceful attempts to persuade them not to cross the border failed. In 1979, Chavez used a forum of a U.S. Senate committee hearing to denounce the federal immigration service, in which he said the U.S. Immigration and Naturalization Service purportedly refused to arrest illegal Mexican immigrants who Chavez claims are being used to break the union's strike.

== Social ==
=== Discrimination ===
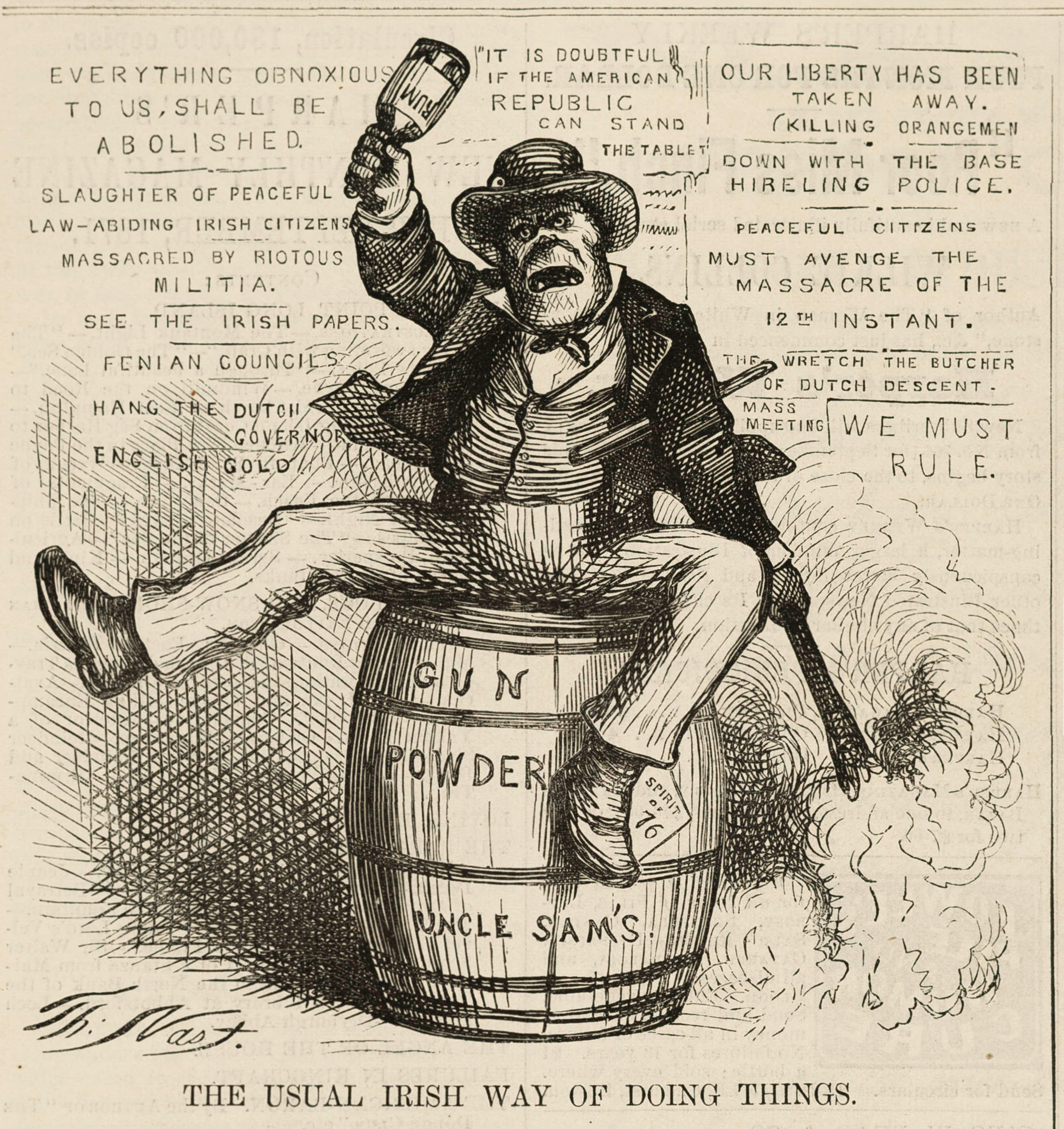
"The Usual Irish Way of Doing Things" anti-Irish propaganda cartoon depicting an Irish caricature lighting an American powder keg while brandishing a bottle. (1871.)

Irish immigration was opposed in the 1850s by the nativist Know Nothing movement, originating in New York in 1843. It was engendered by popular fears that the country was being overwhelmed by Irish-Catholic immigrants. On March 14, 1891, a lynch mob stormed a local jail and lynched several Italians following the acquittal of several Sicilian immigrants alleged to be involved in the murder of New Orleans police chief David Hennessy. The Congress passed the Emergency Quota Act in 1921, followed by the Immigration Act of 1924. The Immigration Act of 1924 was aimed at limiting immigration overall, and making sure that the nationalities of new arrivals matched the overall national profile. Post 9/11, border patrol policies and laws were enforced more strictly to stop the spread of terrorism in the United States, which resulted in targeting of people of color.

=== Assimilation ===
A 2018 study in the American Sociological Review found that within racial groups, most immigrants to the United States had fully assimilated within a span of 20 years. Immigrants arriving in the United States after 1994 assimilate more rapidly than immigrants who arrived in previous periods. Measuring assimilation can be difficult due to "ethnic attrition," which refers to when descendants of migrants cease to self-identify with the nationality or ethnicity of their ancestors. This means that successful cases of assimilation will be underestimated. Research shows that ethnic attrition is sizable in Hispanic and Asian immigrant groups in the United States. By taking ethnic attrition into account, the assimilation rate of Hispanics in the United States improves significantly. A 2016 paper challenges the view that cultural differences are necessarily an obstacle to long-run economic performance of migrants. It finds that "first generation migrants seem to be less likely to success the more culturally distant they are, but this effect vanishes as time spent in the US increases." A 2020 study found that recent immigrants to the United States assimilated at a similar pace as historical immigrants.

== Political ==
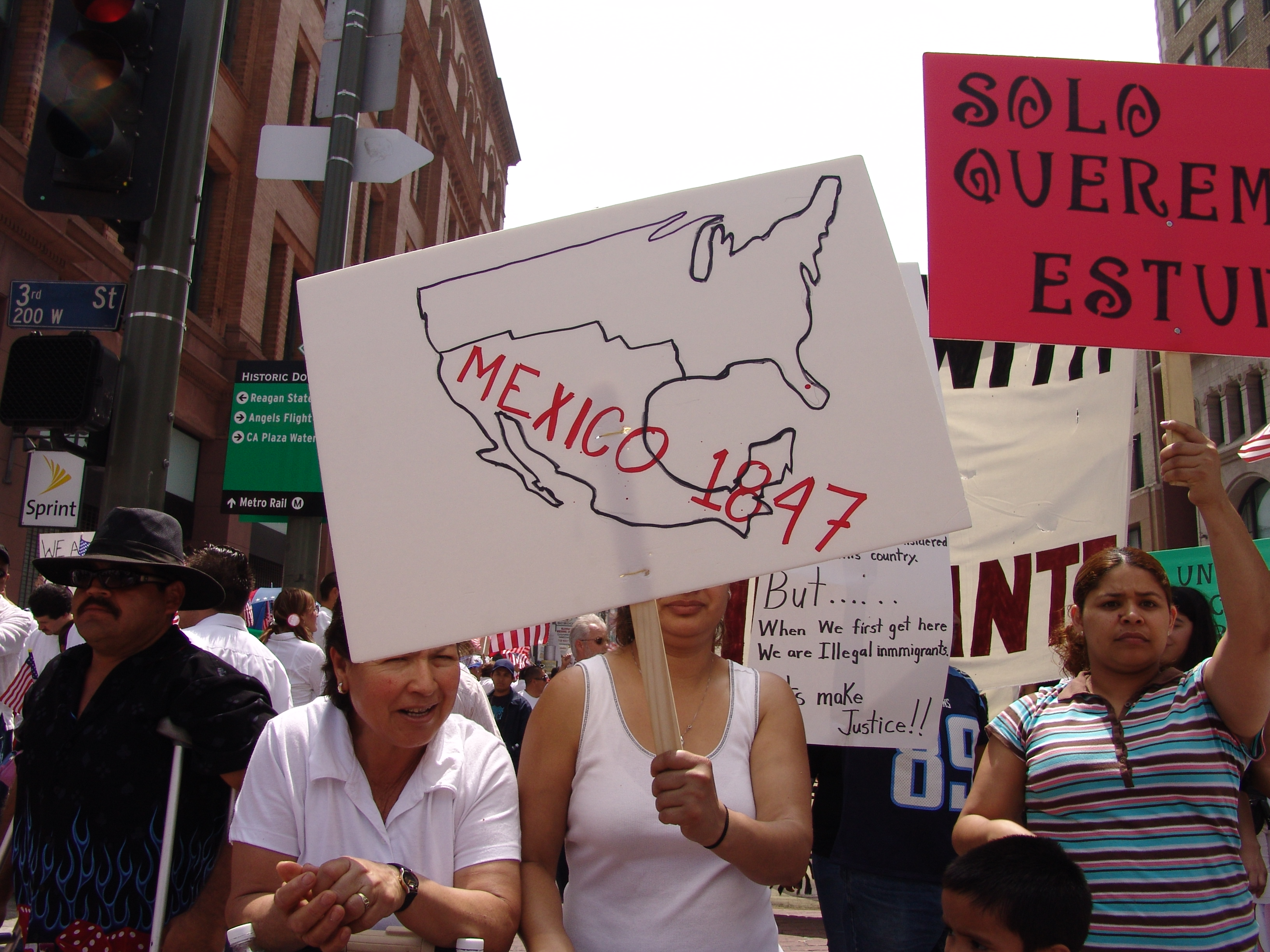
Immigrant rights march in downtown Los Angeles, California on May Day, 2006.

A Boston Globe article attributed Barack Obama's win in the 2008 U.S. presidential election to a marked reduction over the preceding decades in the percentage of white people in the American electorate, attributing this demographic change to the Immigration Act of 1965. The article quoted Simon Rosenberg, president and founder of the New Democrat Network, as having said that the Act is "the most important piece of legislation that no one's ever heard of," and that it "set America on a very different demographic course than the previous 300 years."

Immigrants differ on their political views; however, the Democratic Party is considered to be in a far stronger position among immigrants overall. Research shows that religious affiliation can also significantly impact both the social values and voting patterns of immigrants, as well as the broader American population. Hispanic evangelicals, for example, are more strongly conservative than non-Hispanic evangelicals. This trend is often similar for Hispanics or others strongly identifying with the Catholic Church, which opposes abortion and gay marriage in its tenets.

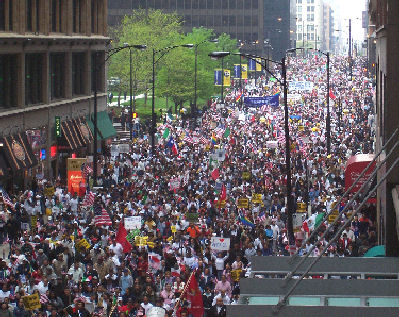
A rally in Chicago, part of the Great American Boycott and 2006 U.S. immigration reform protests, on May 1, 2006.

In a 2012 news story, Reuters reported, "Strong support from Hispanics, the fastest-growing demographic in the United States, helped tip President Barack Obama's fortunes as he secured a second term in the White House, according to Election Day polling."

Before President Trump took office, there was discussion among several Republican leaders, such as governors Bobby Jindal and Susana Martinez, of taking a new, friendlier approach to immigration. Former US Secretary of Commerce Carlos Gutierrez is promoting the creation of Republicans for Immigration Reform.

Bernie Sanders opposes guest worker programs and is also skeptical about skilled immigrant (H-1B) visas, saying, "Last year, the top 10 employers of H-1B guest workers were all offshore outsourcing companies. These firms are responsible for shipping large numbers of American information technology jobs to India and other countries." In an interview with Vox he stated his opposition to an open borders immigration policy, describing it as:

... a right-wing proposal, which says essentially there is no United States ... you're doing away with the concept of a nation-state. What right-wing people in this country would love is an open-border policy. Bring in all kinds of people, work for $2 or $3 an hour, that would be great for them. I don't believe in that. I think we have to raise wages in this country, I think we have to do everything we can to create millions of jobs.

In April 2018, then-president Trump called for National Guard at the border to secure the ongoing attempts at a border wall along the United States–Mexico border. According to the Los Angeles Times, "Defense Secretary James N. Mattis has signed an order to send up to 4,000 National Guard troops to the U.S.–Mexico border but barred them from interacting with migrants detained by the Border Patrol in most circumstances."

The caravan of migrants from Central America have reached the United States to seek asylum. The last of the caravan have arrived and are processing as of May 4, 2018. Remarks by Attorney General Jeff Sessions have expressed hesitation with asylum seekers. Sessions has stated, "The system is being gamed; there's no doubt about it." This statement implied asylum seekers were attempting to immigrate to the United States for work or various other reasons rather than seeking refuge.

Despite much Democratic success in immigrant strongholds, in the 2024 presidential election, immigrant and naturalized voters were more closely divided between the major party candidates than in 2020 or 2016. This was especially true of Hispanic voters. Nonetheless, experts suggest that the change was driven more by shifting voter turnout than party switching, and off-year elections have not proven to continue that trend. Furthermore, polling data has shown Trump in net-negative approval ratings among naturalized immigrants.

=== Lobbying ===
The key interests groups that lobby on immigration are religious, ethnic and business groups, together with some liberals and some conservative public policy organizations. Both the pro- and anti- groups affect policy. Studies have suggested that some special interest groups lobby for less immigration for their own group and more immigration for other groups since they see effects of immigration, such as increased labor competition, as detrimental when affecting their own group but beneficial when affecting other groups. Major American corporations spent $345 million lobbying for just three pro-immigration bills between 2006 and 2008. The two most prominent groups lobbying for more restrictive immigration policies for the United States are NumbersUSA and the Federation for American Immigration Reform (FAIR); additionally, the Center for Immigration Studies think tank produces policy analysis supportive of a more restrictive stance.

A 2011 paper found that both pro- and anti-immigration special interest groups play a role in migration policy. "Barriers to migration are lower in sectors in which business lobbies incur larger lobbying expenditures and higher in sectors where labor unions are more important." A 2011 study examining the voting of US representatives on migration policy suggests that "representatives from more skilled labor abundant districts are more likely to support an open immigration policy towards the unskilled, whereas the opposite is true for representatives from more unskilled labor abundant districts."

After the 2010 election, Gary Segura of Latino Decisions stated that Hispanic voters influenced the outcome and "may have saved the Senate for Democrats". Several ethnic lobbies support immigration reforms that would allow illegal immigrants that have succeeded in entering to gain citizenship. They may also lobby for special arrangements for their own group. The Chairman for the Irish Lobby for Immigration Reform has stated that "the Irish Lobby will push for any special arrangement it can get—'as will every other ethnic group in the country.'" The irredentist and ethnic separatist movements for Reconquista and Aztlán see immigration from Mexico as strengthening their cause.

The book Ethnic Lobbies and US Foreign Policy (2009) states that several ethnic special interest groups are involved in pro-immigration lobbying. Ethnic lobbies also influence foreign policy. The authors wrote that "Increasingly, ethnic tensions surface in electoral races, with House, Senate, and gubernatorial contests serving as proxy battlegrounds for antagonistic ethno-racial groups and communities. In addition, ethnic politics affect party politics as well, as groups compete for relative political power within a party." However, the authors argued that ethnic interest groups, in general, do not currently have too much power in foreign policy and can balance other special interest groups.

== Health ==
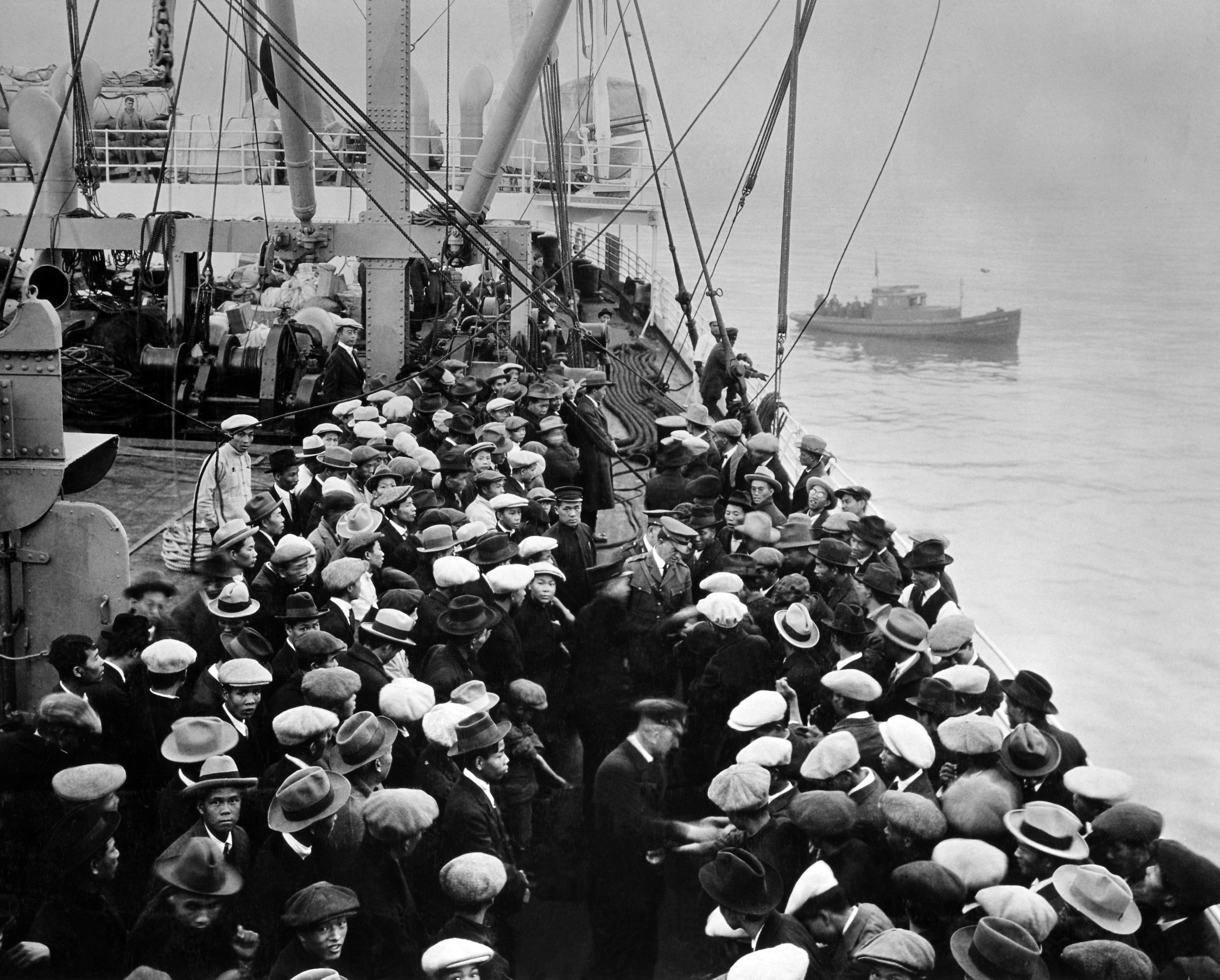
Immigrants awaiting health inspection before entering the United States. (c. 1890s.)

A 2020 study found no evidence that immigration was associated with adverse health impacts for native-born Americans. To the contrary, the study found that "the presence of low‐skilled immigrants may improve the health of low‐skilled U.S.‐born individuals," possibly by moving low-skilled Americans from physically dangerous and risky jobs toward occupations that require more communication and interactive ability. From data retrieved from the U.S Census Bureau in 2021, it shows that Mexicans have the lowest health insurance coverage rates compared to other immigrant groups. This is due to lack of acceptance by many insurance companies and can lead to worse health conditions to the Hispanic community.

On average, per capita health care spending is lower for immigrants than it is for native-born Americans. The non-emergency use of emergency rooms ostensibly indicates an incapacity to pay, yet some studies allege disproportionately lower access to unpaid healthcare by immigrants. For this and other reasons, there have been various disputes about how much immigration is costing the United States public health system. University of Maryland economist and Cato Institute scholar Julian Lincoln Simon concluded in 1995 that while immigrants probably pay more into the health system than they take out; this is not the case for elderly immigrants and refugees, who are more dependent on public services for survival. Immigration itself may impact women's health. A 2017 study found that Latino women suffer higher rates of intimate partner violence (IPV) than native US women. Migration may worsen IPV rates and outcomes. Migration itself may not cause IPV, but it may make it more difficult for women to get help. According to Kim et al., the IPV is usually the result of unequal family structures rather than the process of migration.

Immigration from areas of high incidences of disease is thought to have been one of the causes of the resurgence of tuberculosis (TB), chagas, and hepatitis in areas of low incidence. According to Centers for Disease Control and Prevention (CDC), TB cases among foreign-born individuals remain disproportionately high, at nearly nine times the rate of U.S.-born persons. To reduce the risk of diseases in low-incidence areas, the main countermeasure has been the screening of immigrants on arrival. HIV/AIDS entered the United States in around 1969, likely through a single infected immigrant from Haiti. Conversely, many new HIV infections in Mexico can be traced back to the United States. People infected with HIV were banned from entering the United States in 1987 by executive order, but the 1993 statute supporting the ban was lifted in 2009. The executive branch is expected to administratively remove HIV from the list of infectious diseases barring immigration, but immigrants generally would need to show that they would not be a burden on public welfare. Researchers have also found what is known as the "healthy immigrant effect," in which immigrants in general tend to be healthier than individuals born in the U.S. Immigrants are more likely than native-born Americans to have a medical visit labeled uncompensated care.

== Crime ==
There is no empirical evidence that either legal or illegal immigration increases crime in the United States. In fact, a majority of studies in the U.S. have found lower crime rates among immigrants than among non-immigrants, and that higher concentrations of immigrants are associated with lower crime rates. Explanations proposed to account for this relationship have included ethnic enclaves, self-selection, and the hypothesis that immigrants revitalize communities to which they emigrate. Some research even suggests that increases in immigration may partly explain the reduction in the U.S. crime rate.

A 2005 study showed that immigration to large U.S. metropolitan areas does not increase, and in some cases decreases, crime rates there. A 2009 study found that recent immigration was not associated with homicide in Austin, Texas. The low crime-rates of immigrants to the United States despite having lower levels of education, lower levels of income, and residing in urban areas (factors that should lead to higher crime-rates) may be due to lower rates of antisocial behavior among immigrants. A 2015 study found that Mexican immigration to the United States was associated with an increase in aggravated assaults and a decrease in property crimes. A 2016 study finds no link between immigrant populations and violent crime, although there is a small but significant association between undocumented immigrants and drug-related crime.

A 2018 study found that undocumented immigration to the United States did not increase violent crime. Research finds that Secure Communities, an immigration enforcement program which led to a quarter of a million of detentions (when the study was published; November 2014), had no observable impact on the crime rate. A 2015 study found that the 1986 Immigration Reform and Control Act, which legalized almost 3 million immigrants, led to "decreases in crime of 3–5 percent, primarily due to decline in property crimes, equivalent to 120,000–180,000 fewer violent and property crimes committed each year due to legalization."

According to one study, sanctuary cities—which adopt policies designed to not prosecute people solely for being an illegal immigrant—have no statistically meaningful effect on crime.

One of the first political analyses in the U.S. of the relationship between immigration and crime was performed in the beginning of the 20th century by the Dillingham Commission, which found a relationship especially for immigrants from non-Northern European countries, resulting in the sweeping 1920s immigration reduction acts, including the Emergency Quota Act of 1921, which favored immigration from northern and western Europe.

Researchers are skeptical of the conclusion drawn by the Dillingham Commission. One study finds that "major government commissions on immigration and crime in the early twentieth century relied on evidence that suffered from aggregation bias and the absence of accurate population data, which led them to present partial and sometimes misleading views of the immigrant-native criminality comparison. With improved data and methods, we find that in 1904, prison commitment rates for more serious crimes were quite similar by nativity for all ages except ages 18 and 19, for which the commitment rate for immigrants was higher than for the native-born. By 1930, immigrants were less likely than natives to be committed to prisons at all ages 20 and older, but this advantage disappears when one looks at commitments for violent offenses."

For the early twentieth century, one study found that immigrants had "quite similar" imprisonment rates for major crimes as natives in 1904 but lower for major crimes (except violent offenses; the rate was similar) in 1930. Contemporary commissions used dubious data and interpreted it in questionable ways. Research suggests that police practices, such as racial profiling, over-policing in areas populated by minorities and in-group bias may result in disproportionately high numbers of racial minorities among crime suspects. Research also suggests that there may be possible discrimination by the judicial system, which contributes to a higher number of convictions for racial minorities. A 2012 study found that "(i) juries formed from all-white jury pools convict black defendants significantly (16 percentage points) more often than white defendants, and (ii) this gap in conviction rates is entirely eliminated when the jury pool includes at least one black member." Research has found evidence of in-group bias, where "black (white) juveniles who are randomly assigned to black (white) judges are more likely to get incarcerated (as opposed to being placed on probation), and they receive longer sentences." In-group bias has also been observed when it comes to traffic citations, as black and white police officers are more likely to cite out-groups.

=== Crimmigration ===
Crimmigration has emerged as a field in which critical immigration scholars conceptualize the current immigration law enforcement system. Crimmigration is broadly defined as the convergence of the criminal justice system and immigration enforcement, where immigration law enforcement has adopted the "criminal" law enforcement approach. This frames undocumented immigrants as "criminal" deviants and security risks. Crime control and migration control have become closely intertwined, to the extent that both undocumented and documented individuals suspected of being noncitizens may be targeted.

Using a "crimmigration" point of thought, César Cuauhtémoc García Hernández explains the criminalization of undocumented immigrants began in the aftermath of the civil rights movement. Michelle Alexander explores how the U.S. criminal justice system is made of "colorblind" policies and law enforcement practices that have shaped the mass incarceration of people of color into an era of "The New Jim Crow." As Alexander and García Hernández state, overt racism and racist laws became culturally scorned, and covert racism became the norm. This new form of racism focuses on penalizing criminal activity and promoting "neutral" rhetoric.

"Crimmigration" recognizes how laws and policies throughout different states contribute to the convergence of criminal law enforcement and immigration law. For example, states are implementing a variety of immigration-related criminal offenses that are punishable by imprisonment. California, Oregon, and Wyoming criminalize the use of fraudulent immigration or citizenship documents. Arizona allows judges to confine witnesses in certain "criminal" cases if they are suspected of being in the U.S. without documentation. The most common violations of immigration law on the federal level are unauthorized entry (a federal misdemeanor) and unauthorized reentry (a federal felony). These "offenses" deemed as "crimes" under immigration law set the tone of "crimmigration" and for what García Hernández refers to as the "removal pipeline" of immigrants.

Some scholars focus on the organization of "crimmigration" as it relates to the mass removal of certain immigrants. Jennifer Chacón finds that immigration law enforcement is being decentralized. Customs and Border Patrol (CBP), Immigration and Customs Enforcement (ICE), and the Department of Homeland Security (DHS) are the central law enforcement agencies in control of enforcing immigration law. However, other federal, state and local law enforcement agencies, such as sheriff's offices, municipal police departments, the Federal Bureau of Investigation (FBI), and the Drug and Enforcement Agency (DEA), aid in immigrant removal. In 1996, Congress expanded power to state and local law enforcement agencies to enforce federal immigration law. These agencies keep people locked up in jails or prison when they receive an "immigration detainer" from ICE, and therefore aid in interior enforcement. In addition, some agencies participate in the State Criminal Alien Assistance Program ("SCAAP"), which gives these agencies financial incentives to cooperate with ICE in identifying immigrants in their custody.

== Education ==
Scientific laboratories and internet startup opportunities have been a significant factor in immigration to the United States. By 2000, 23% of scientists with a PhD in the U.S. were immigrants, including 40% of those in engineering and computers. Roughly a third of the United States' college and universities graduate students in STEM fields are foreign nationals—in some states it is well over half of their graduate students. A study on public schools in California found that white enrollment declined in response to increases in the number of Spanish-speaking Limited English Proficient and Hispanic students. This white flight was greater for schools with relatively larger proportions of Spanish-speaking Limited English Proficient. A North Carolina study found that the presence of Latin American children in schools had no significant negative effects on peers, but that students with limited English skills had slight negative effects on peers.

On Ash Wednesday, March 5, 2014, the presidents of 28 Catholic and Jesuit colleges and universities joined the "Fast for Families" movement. The "Fast for Families" movement revived the immigration debate in the autumn of 2013 when the movement's leaders, supported by many members of Congress and the President, fasted for twenty-two days on the National Mall in Washington, D.C.

== Science and engineering ==
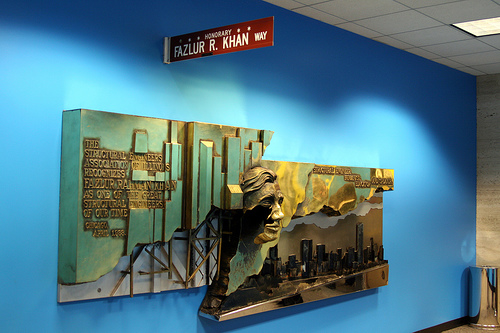
Immigrant Fazlur Khan is known for making some very important advancements in skyscraper engineering. Sculpture honoring Khan at the Willis Tower.

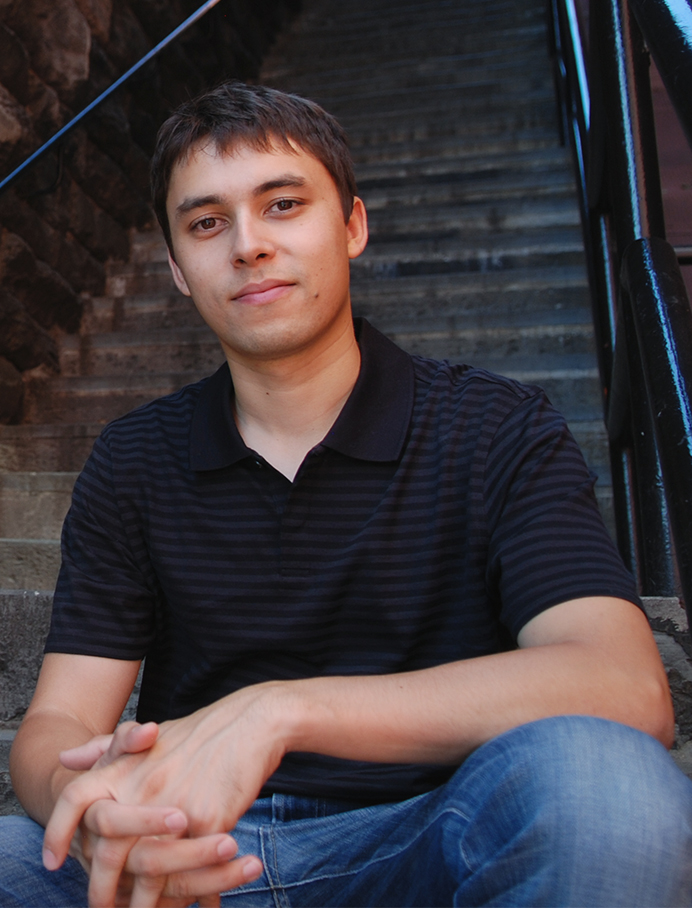
Jawed Karim (above) and Steve Chen (below), co-founders of YouTube; they are both immigrants to the US

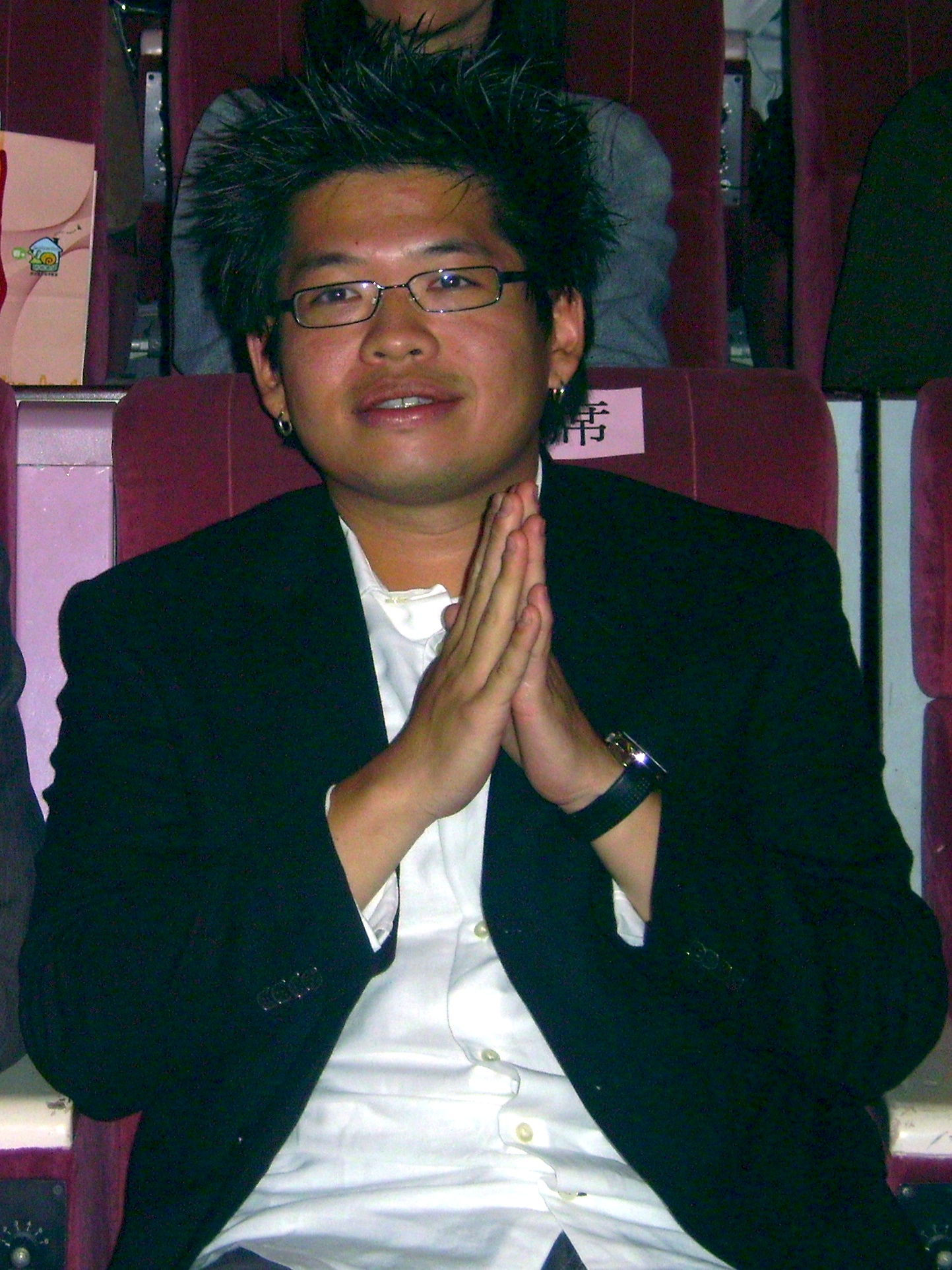

In the United States, a significant proportion of scientists and engineers are foreign-born, as well as students in science and engineering programs. However, this is not unique to the US since foreigners make up significant amounts of scientists and engineers in other countries. As of 2011, 28% of graduate students in science, engineering, and health are foreign. The number of science and engineering (S&E) bachelor's degrees has increased steadily over the past 15 years, reaching a new peak of 611,600 in 2009. Since 2000, foreign-born students in the United States have consistently earned a small share (4%) of S&E degrees at the bachelor's level. Foreign students make up a much higher proportion of S&E master's degree recipients than of bachelor's or associate degree recipients. In 2009, foreign students earned 27% of S&E master's degrees and 33% in doctorate degrees.

Significant numbers of foreign-born students in science and engineering are not unique to America, since foreign students now account for nearly 60% of graduate students in mathematics, computer sciences, and engineering globally. In Switzerland and the United Kingdom, more than 40% of doctoral students are foreign. A number of other countries, including Austria, Australia, Belgium, Canada, New Zealand, and the United States, have relatively high percentages (more than 20%) of doctoral students who are foreign. Foreign student enrollment in the United Kingdom has been increasing. In 2008, foreign students made up 47% of all graduate students studying S&E in the United Kingdom (an increase from 32% in 1998). Top destinations for international students include the United Kingdom (12%), Germany (9%), and France (9%). Together with the U.S., these countries receive more than half of all internationally mobile students worldwide.

Although the United States continued to attract the largest number and fraction of foreign students worldwide, its share of foreign students decreased from 24% in 2000 to 19% in 2008. 55% of PhD students in engineering in the United States are foreign-born (2004). Between 1980 and 2000, the percentage of PhD scientists and engineers employed in the United States who were born abroad increased from 24% to 37%. 45% of PhD physicists working in the United States were foreign-born in 2004. 80% of total post-doctoral chemical and materials engineering in the United States were foreign-born in 1988.

At the undergraduate level, US-born engineering students constitute upwards of 90–95% of the student population (most foreign-born candidates for engineering graduate schools are trained in their home countries). However, the pool of BS engineering graduates with US citizenship is much larger than the number who apply to engineering graduate schools. The proportion of foreign-born engineers among assistant professors younger than 35 years increased from 10% in 1972 to 50–55% in 1983–1985, illustrating a dramatic increase on US dependence on foreign-born students in the US college system. The increase in non-citizen assistant professors of engineering followed a period between 1995 and 2005 where foreign-born engineers received approximately 50% of newly awarded engineering doctorates, while naturalized citizens accounted for about 4% and, furthermore, they entered academe in disproportionately large numbers. 33% of all U.S. PhDs in science and engineering were awarded to foreign-born graduate students as of 2004.

In 1982, foreign-born engineers constituted about 3.6% of all engineers employed in the United States, 13.9% of which were naturalized; and foreign-born PhDs in Engineering constituted 15% and 20% were naturalized. In 1985, foreign-born PhDs represented almost 33% of the engineering post-doctorate researchers in US universities. Foreign-born PhD engineers often accept postdoctoral positions because other employment is unavailable until a green card is obtained. This creates a system that further incentivizes the replacement of US citizens in the upper echelons of academic and private sector engineering firms, due to the higher educational attainment of foreign-born individuals relative to native-born engineers, who for the most part do not train beyond the undergraduate level.

Between 1995 and 2015, the number of applicants for faculty openings at research universities have increased dramatically. Numbers of 50 to 200 applications for a single faculty opening have become typical, yet even with such high numbers of applicants, the foreign-born component is in excess of 50%. 60% of the top science students and 65 percent of the top math students in the United States are the children of immigrants. In addition, foreign-born high school students make up 50 percent of the 2004 U.S. Math Olympiad's top scorers, 38 percent of the U.S. Physics Team, and 25 percent of the Intel Science Talent Search finalists—the United States' most prestigious awards for young scientists and mathematicians.

Among 1985 foreign-born engineering doctorate holders, about 40% expected to work in the United States after graduating. An additional 17 percent planned to stay on as post-doctorates, and most of these are likely to remain permanently in the United States. Thus, almost 60% of foreign-born engineering doctorate holders are likely to become part of the US engineering labor force within a few years after graduating. The other approximately 40% of foreign born engineering PhDs mostly likely find employment working for multinational corporations outside of the US.

In the 2004 Intel Science Talent Search, more children (18) have parents who entered the country on H-1B (professional) visas than parents born in the United States (16). New H-1B visa holders each year represent less than 0.04 percent of the U.S. population. Foreign born faculty now account for over 50% of faculty in engineering (1994).

27 out the 87 (more than 30%) American Nobel Prize winners in Medicine and Physiology between 1901 and 2005 were born outside the US.

Immigrants from North Africa and the Middle East, on average, have higher levels of education. Their industries tend to be more similar to those of workers born in the United States than to those from other countries, with relatively higher shares of workers in management, business, science, and the arts.

=== PhD data ===
1993 median salaries of U.S. recipients of a PhD in Science and Engineering foreign-born vs. native-born were as follows:

| Years since earning degree | Foreign-born | Native-born |
|---|---|---|
| 1–5 years | $44,400 | $40,000 |
| 6–10 years | $55,400 | $49,200 |
| 11–15 years | $64,000 | $56,000 |
| 16–20 years | $64,000 | $56,000 |
| 21 years | $70,200 | $68,000 |
