= Sociology of immigration =

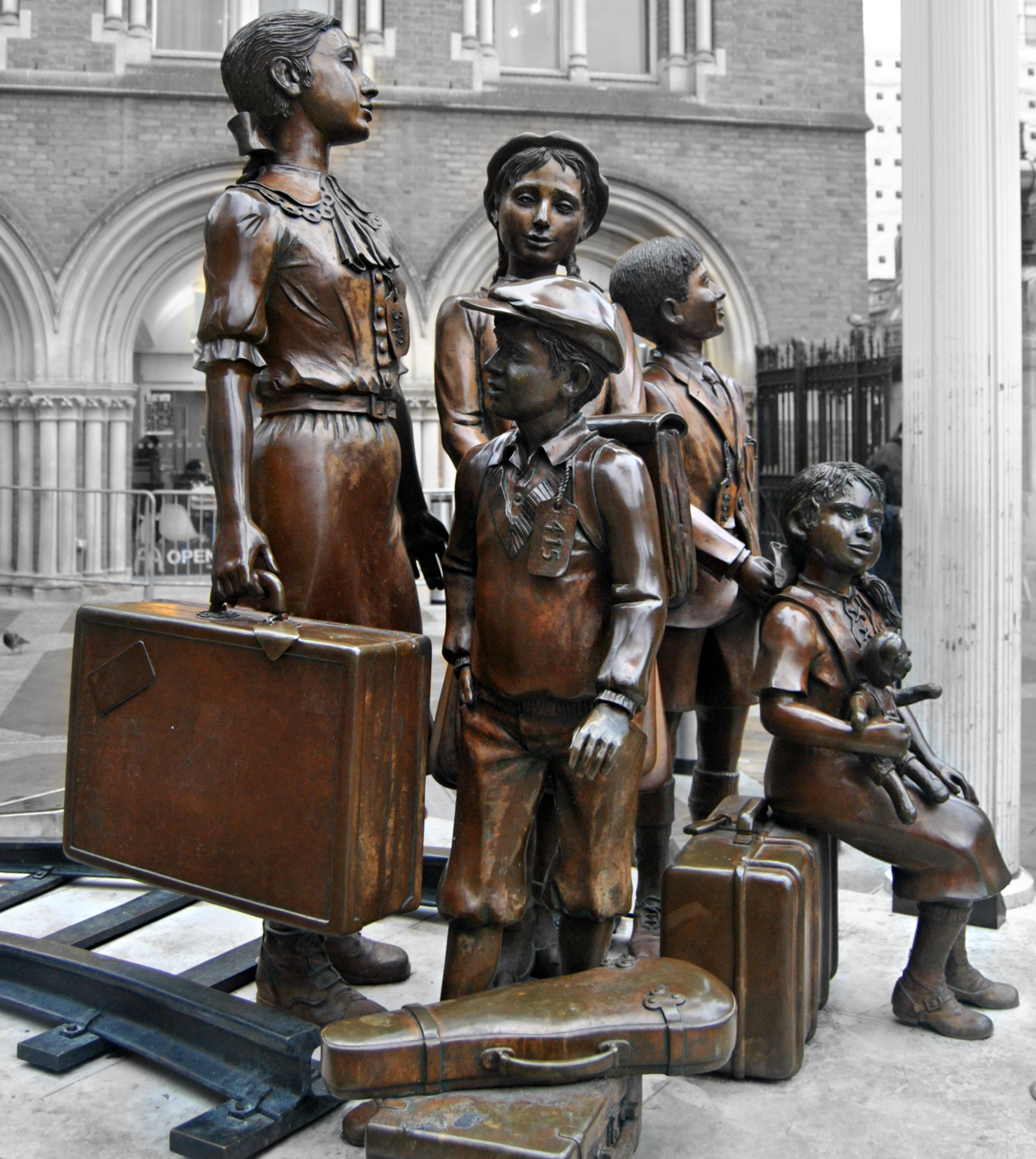
Hope Square is dedicated to the Children of the Kindertransport, who found hope and safety in Britain through the gateway of Liverpool Street Station. Association of Jewish Refugees, Central British Fund for World Jewish Relief, 2006.

The sociology of immigration involves the sociological analysis of immigration, particularly with respect to race and ethnicity, social structure, and political policy. Important concepts include assimilation, enculturation, marginalization, multiculturalism, postcolonialism, transnationalism and social cohesion.

== History ==
=== Pre-twentieth century ===
Nativism has a long history in many societies.

=== Twentieth century ===
Global migration during the twentieth century grew particularly during the first half of the century. Due to World War I and World War II, European immigrants came to the United States (for example) in vast quantities. Particularly following the end (1918) of World War I, some Americans labeled European immigrants as dangerous to American culture. In 1924 the United States Congress passed the Immigration Act of 1924, which placed strict quotas on immigrants entering the United States. During the 1920s -1930s women's citizenship was all dependent on a father or husband, so because of the rules many women used marriage as a way to immigrate. This means that for many women they are tied to becoming either a wife or mother.

From the 1960s to 1990s, the stigma labeling immigrants as "job takers" and "criminals" subsided, and instead Americans began to consider immigrants as benefactors to the American economy, culture, and political system. Although the negative labels that immigrants were given during the first half of the twentieth century influenced their actions in society and self-perceptions (known as labeling theory in sociology), immigrants now began to assimilate more easily into society and to form strong social networks that contributed to their acquisition of social capital—the "information, knowledge of people or things, and connections that help individuals enter, gain power in, or otherwise leverage social networks".

=== Twenty-first century ===
Sociologists have studied immigration closely in the twenty-first century. In the United States, compared to the majority of European immigrants during the early twentieth century, the twenty-first century witnessed the arrival of immigrants predominately from Asia, the Middle East, and Latin America. From 2000 to 2001, sociologists have paid particular attention to the costs and benefits of the new diversified immigration population on American institutions, culture, economic functions, and national security. After the attacks on the World Trade Center and the Pentagon on September 11, 2001, sociologists closely analyzed the symbolism of increased anti-immigration rhetoric, directed at Middle Eastern immigrants, stemming from Americans. Structural functionalist theorists have also studied the effects of mass migration—resulting from wars, economic insecurity, and terrorism—on the social institutions of host nations, on international law, and on assimilation rates. Additionally, sociologists using social-conflict theory have analyzed, in particular, labor-market conflicts allegedly resulting from increased marketplace competition due to the rise in competition between immigrants and native workers for jobs and social mobility. Because rates of global immigration continue to increase, the field of sociology has a particular interest in monitoring twenty-first century immigration as it relates to the foundational theories of symbolic interactionism, social conflict, and structural functionalism.

=== Generational change ===
In immigration studies, social scientists assign distinct definitions to various immigrant generations. In sociology, the word "generation" is used as a "measure of distance from the 'old country'". This means that sociologists define people who move to (in the case of immigrants migrating to the United States) the United States from another society, as adults, as "first generation" immigrants, their American-born children as "second generation" immigrants, and their children in turn as "third generation" immigrants.

During the mid-twentieth century in the United States, the first, second, and third generations of immigrants displayed distinct characteristics. Second-generation immigrants, having immigrant parents who witnessed the historical events unfolding in the mid-twentieth century, developed a distinct social identity both in themselves and in popular American culture. In the late 1930s, American historian Marcus Lee Hansen observed "distinct differences in attitudes toward ethnic identity between the second generation and their third-generation children". Whereas the second generation was anxious to assimilate, the third generation was sentimentally invested in "ethnicity", which sociologist Dalton Conley defines as "one's ethnic quality or affiliation". However, twenty-first century immigrants now assimilate more than their twentieth-century predecessors, most notably in the transition to using English—among immigrants who move to the United States—as the primary language for communication.

While contemporary immigrant generations share common ethnic backgrounds and cultures, there are differences in the level of social mobility, economic achievement, educational attainment, and familial relations among the members of those generations.

== Three sociological perspectives ==
=== Symbolic interactionism ===
Symbolic interactionism is a "micro-level theory in which shared meanings, orientations, and assumptions form the basic motivations behind people's actions". This theory, as opposed to macrosociology, is focused on how face-to-face interactions create the social world.

In order to understand how perceptions of immigrants are formed and constructed, symbolic interactionism theory has been utilized. Immigration into the United States has been on the rise since 1965. Public opinion polls have demonstrated "that the percentage of Americans who wanted immigration decreased to be very low immediately prior to 1965, but had begun an upward incline from 1965 to the late 1970s at which time it thereafter increased dramatically". One of the reasons why there is a negative native response to increased immigration is because of the often-negative images of immigrants being elicited by the media. Moreover, immigration legislation, such as the 1996 Personal Responsibility and Work Opportunity Reconciliation Act, increased anti-immigration sentiment, and nativist rhetoric, and social movements in the United States. Perceived group threat also has been proven to maintain an important role in explaining Americans' attitude toward immigrants. Fear of foreigners altering aspects of the established culture, such as the native language, results in nativist sentiment and further polarization. Together, these instances illustrate the significance of immigrants' master status in shaping how others perceive them, and how they perceive themselves. For example, the racial stigma that Mexican immigrants encounter in the United States "reinforces the low status and the self perceptions of Mexican Americans". When Mexican Americans internalize this perception of their race, they begin to act accordingly and indirectly reinforce this perception.

The rise in islamophobia in the United States, after the attacks on the World Trade Center, is an example of symbolic interactionism in practice. After the attacks on the World Trade Center on September 11, 2001, "Arabs and Muslims (as well as Latinos, South Asians, and other individuals who were mistakenly perceived to be Arab or Muslim based on their skin color, dress, or organizational affiliations) suffered an unprecedented outbreak of backlash violence" because of assumptions by others that they were terrorists who intended to do harm to Americans. In the days and months following the 9/11 attacks, Muslims and Arabs were subject to hate crimes based on personal characteristics such as their clothing, accent, facial hair, and skin tone. From a symbolic interactionist perspective, the violent attacks against Arabs and Muslims resulted from the shared assumptions and meanings that Americans attributed to Arab and Muslim people and culture.

=== Social conflict ===
Social conflict theory is a sociological perspective that views society as a constant struggle for power and resources. This theory holds that competition between competing interests is a central function of society. Social conflict theorists believe that competition for power and resources results in social change.

Since the early nineteenth century, advocates and opponents of immigration have analyzed the economic effects of immigration on national economies and workforces. Opponents of national increases in immigration rates have argued that restricting immigration "improves the economic well-being of native workers". Immigration, opponents argue, causes unemployment for native workers. The reasoning behind this argument is that immigrant peoples compete with the native peoples for jobs and resources. This increased competition results in more jobs going to immigrant workers since it costs less for employers to hire a highly skilled immigrant that just came into the U.S and doesn't really know any English, than a low-skilled native worker. However, advocates of immigration argue that immigration improves a nations economy since more people enter the workforce, thus resulting in higher productivity and increased competition in the labor market. Additionally, proponents argue that the native population benefits from immigration since "immigrants increase the demand for goods and services produced by native workers and firms". Social conflict theorists suggest that the competition between native workers and immigrant workers, for economic achievement and social mobility, is at the crux of the immigration debate as it relates to economics.

A common fear is that immigration will alter the native culture of a nation. In the discipline of sociology, "culture" is defined as a "set of beliefs, traditions, and practices".

=== Structural functionalism of Immigrants ===
Structural functionalism is a sociological perspective "claiming that every society has certain structures that exist to fulfill some set of necessary functions". Drawing on the ideas of sociologist Émile Durkheim, society through this sociological lens is thought of as a living organism—similar to the nineteenth-century theory of organicism.

Regarding the economy of a society, immigrants play a prominent role in maintaining, disrupting, and/or contributing to the social cohesion. For example, since the 1980s and 1990s, the American economy has favored workers who have valuable skills to offer. If immigrants to the United States, for example, have valuable skills to offer, they may "increase the chances of economic success in the United States, such as the language and culture of the American workplace". The human capital and physical resources that immigrants may have to offer can complement those that already exist in the American economy. Structural functionalists believe that, whether the effects are positive or negative, immigration significantly impacts the level of social cohesion in the workplace. This analysis of social cohesion is closely related to the work of sociologist Émile Durkheim.

Sociologists utilizing structural functionalism would explain that immigration serves the function of a unifier for the immigrant population in a foreign society. Especially in the nineteenth century and early twentieth century, immigrants in the United States tended to socialize with people of similar ethnic backgrounds in order to experience group solidarity during a time of intense resocialization. This feeling of group solidarity led to increased social capital, which held people together and decreased the sense of anomie among immigrants, which is a "sense of aimlessness or despair that arises when we can no longer reasonably expect life to be predictable". Immigration, therefore, served as a mechanism for social networks to be built among immigrant populations during a period of intense resocialization and prevalent cases of anomic suicide.

== Transnationalism ==
A more contemporary sociological analysis of immigration can be explored within the concept of transnationalism. This analysis is perhaps more concerned with the relational dimensions of immigration, particularly in terms of the ways in which families and relationships are maintained when members migrate to another country. Theorist Zlatko Skrbis argues that within a transnational network of families, the patterns of migration are intertwined with notions of 'emotion' and 'belonging'.

== Sociology of peace, war, and social conflict ==
The refugees as weapons is analyzed as forced experience of mass exodus of refugees from a state to a hostile state as a "weapon."

== See also ==
- Black feminism
- Dalton Conley
- Émile Durkheim
- Human migration
- Immigration country
- Immigration to the United States
- Sociology of race and ethnic relations
- The New Americans: Economic, Demographic, and Fiscal Effects of Immigration
- Migration studies
