= South Campus (University of Copenhagen) =

Danish university campus

Coordinates: 55°39′46″N 12°35′20″E

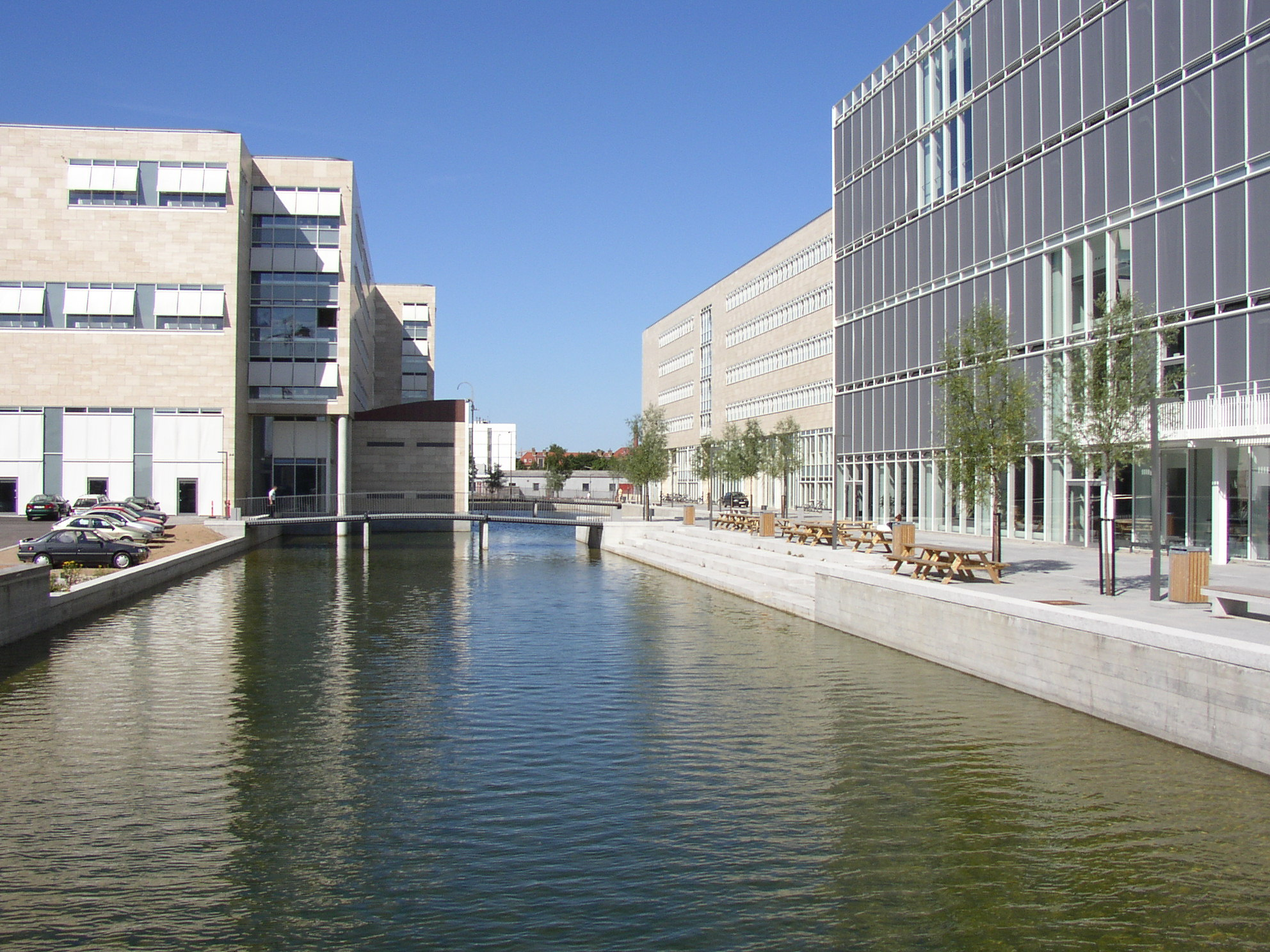
The Faculty of Humanities on Amager

The South Campus (Danish: Søndre Campus), also known as KUA (Danish: Københavns Universitet, Amager; English: University of Copenhagen, Amager), is one of the University of Copenhagen's four campuses in Copenhagen, Denmark. It is situated on Amager just south of Njalsgade, between Ørestad Boulevard and Amager Fælledvej, forming the northernmost part of Ørestad. It is home to the Faculty of Humanities, the Faculty of Theology and the Faculty of Law. The campus is home to approximately 15,000 students.

== History ==
Built between 1972 and 1979 to a Brutalist design by Eva and Nils Koppel, Københavns Universitet Amager, was originally only built as a temporary home for the Facility of the Humanities. As time progressed became a permanent solution and it was instead decided to expand and modernize the complex. In 1997, KHR Arkitekter won an architectural competition for the first phase of the expansion, KUA1, which was completed in 2001.

The original KUA buildings were largely demolished in connection with phase 2 and 3. The second phase of the expansion was designed by Arkitema and completed in 2013. The third phase was completed in 2017, and saw the Faculty of Theology and the Faculty of Law move to the campus.

In 2022, it was decided that the Faculty of Social Sciences would move to South Campus, increasing the number of faculties on the campus to four. As of spring 2025, the move had yet to commence, with the deans of the four faculties deliberating on the final layout of the campus.

== Buildings ==
KUA1 consists of a series of long, six-story buildings with a pale, travertine cladding.

KUA2 reused structural elements from the original KUA buildings but adapted them with a cladding similar to the one used on KUA1. They have also been connected by more transparent, intersecting wings.

== Outdoor spaces ==
The 20,000-square-metre public plaza Karen Blixens Plads os a focal point for outdoor life in the area. Completed in 2019 to designs by local architectural firm Cobe, it is one of the largest public spaces of its kind in the city. It is named for noted 20th-century Danish author Karen Blixen.

A dominant feature of the plaza is the three "bicycle mounds" with provide parking for sheltered and concealed parking of 2,000 bicycles. The domed structures are cast concrete shells with rounded openings, clad with hand-laid tiles in pale colours that match the exteriors of the surrounding buildings. Steps cut into the sides of the larger concrete hills allow the space to double as an outdoor auditorium, which can be used for concerts, performances and other public events.

A Rambla connects Karen Blixens Plads, in opposite directions, to Islands Brygge Metro Station and a new park, Grønningen, separating the campus area from the housing estates Boligslangen and Karen Blixens Have to the south.

== Research Centres ==
Since 2002, the Centre for Subjectivity Research has been based at the South Campus. Since 2013, the Centre for Advanced Migration Studies has been based at the South Campus.

== Transport ==
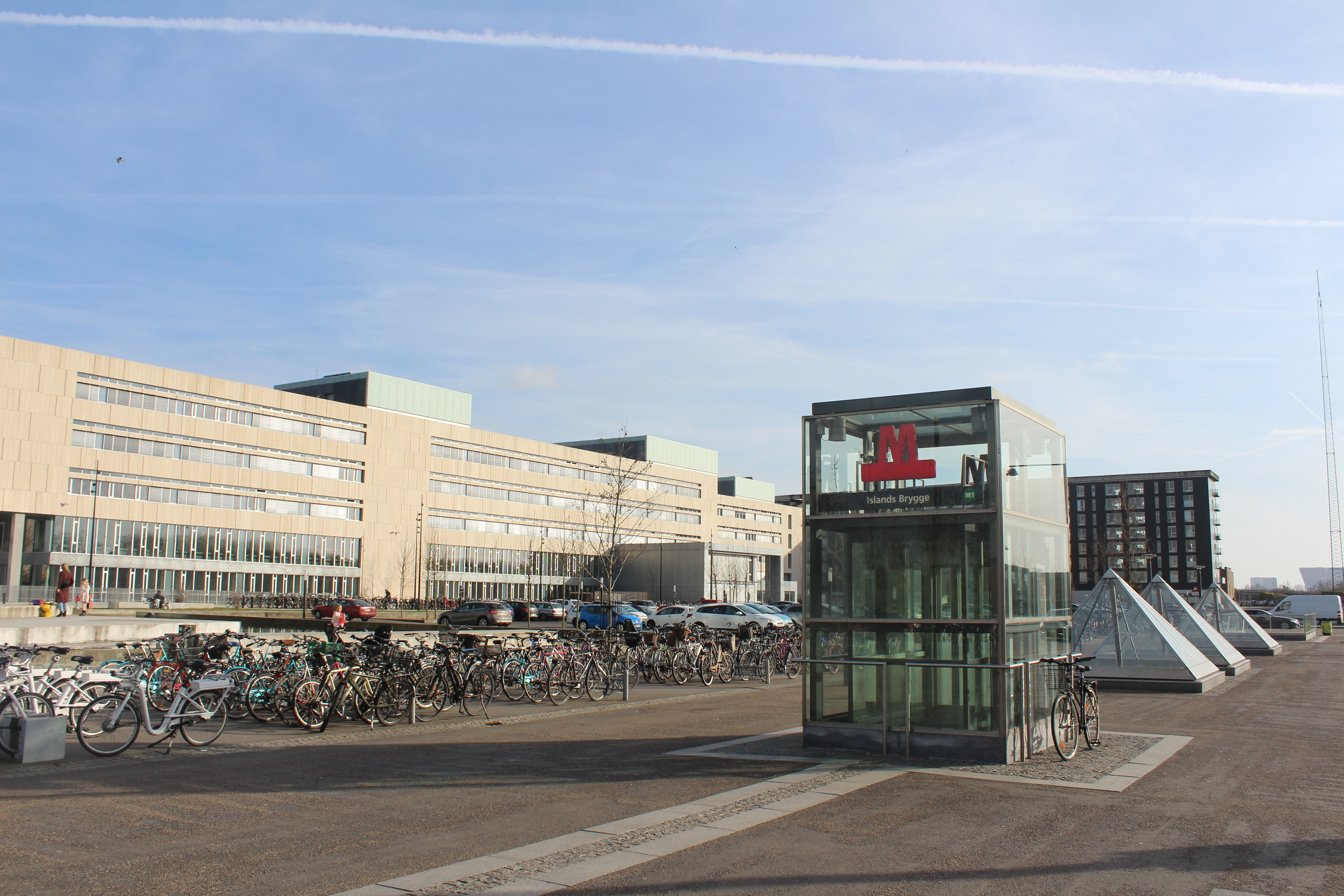
The view of Søndre Campus from Islands Brygge Station.

Islands Brygge Station is located next to the campus, on the corner of Njalsgade and Ørestad Boulevard, serving the M1 line of the Copenhagen Metro.
