= Migration studies =

Academic study of human migration

Migration studies is the academic study of human migration. Migration studies is an interdisciplinary field which draws on anthropology, prehistory, history, economics, law, sociology and postcolonial studies.

== Origin and development of migration studies ==
Migration studies did not develop along a uni-linear path and it has developed with significantly different trajectories in different academic cultures and traditions. Migration studies does not exist as a self-contained discipline and instead finds its heritage in a variety of places. Developments in the sociology of migration, the study of the history of human migration, theories and policies concerning labour migration, and postcolonial studies all fed into the growth of migration studies. The development of migration studies is also bound up with the growth in interdisciplinary pursuits which has resulted from the popularisation of postmodern thought in the past thirty years. In recent years, scholarship which takes interest in humanitarian issues has become increasingly popular. In part, this reflects displacement and refugee movements which have resulted from conflicts throughout the end of the 20th century and at the turn of the 21st century.

== Key topics in migration studies ==
=== Migration histories ===
Archaeological studies frequently focus on early human migration flows, the spread of civilisation and the development of trade routes and settlements by early humans. The debate over migrationism and diffusionism features prominently in archaeological approaches to migration studies. The study of empire, colonisation, and diaspora constitute significant themes in historical approaches to migration studies. This has, for instance, manifested in studies of the forced migrations during the 1947 Partition of India, the internal displacement of the 1861-1865 American Civil War, or the Great Migration of 6 million African Americans from the rural southern states to the urban Northeast, Midwest, and West. Scholars can research migration histories through a variety of methods including quantitative approaches based on censuses and government documents, social histories, the examination of material culture, or through autobiography.

=== Literature and the arts ===
One branch of research in migration studies involves the consideration of how migration, settlement, and diaspora interact with literature and the arts. For example, in a 2017 paper Dr Michelle Keown discussed how US military imperialism and Marshallese migration affected the poetry of Kathy Jetnil-Kijiner. Researchers have also examined migration in relation to the circulation of music, particularly of folk-songs. Migration is a recurring theme in much popular media, such as in Chimamanda Ngozi Adichie's 2013 novel Americanah or in contemporary film such as Roma (2018), consequently, discussions on migration and the arts are some of the more publicly visible avenues of scholarship in migration studies. More recently, attention has been paid to how theatre becomes a site for migrant performing their agency within public spaces. In 2020 article, Kasia Lech studied responses to Brexit by multilingual UK-based migrant theatre practitioners, Situating their work in "the paradox of simultaneous hyper- and in-visibility of immigrants in the UK" and argued that "the migrant perspective is crucial for the debate on Brexit as part of the broader European Union’s crisis of commonality and solidarity.".

=== Urbanism ===
Scholars of migration in the context of urbanism consider the dynamics of how cities and migrant populations interact. This can include issues of town planning, issues of ghettoisation and social exclusion, and processes of integration and community-building. Urbanists may also consider how one can regard refugee camps as global cities, and how to plan, develop, and operate these camp spaces.

=== Economics ===
The economic results of migration, (e.g. human capital flight) are a popular area of research and stimulate much consequent debate. Perhaps the most publicly discussed topic within the economics of migration is transnational labour migration and how migrants are either encouraged or discouraged to move as a result of economic considerations, this remains a controversial and multifaceted topic. Migration is researched in relation to its impacts on both sending and destination communities. The study of how migrant workers send remittances is another frequent topic for scholars studying the economics of migration. Some research has focused on novel topics including the internal economies of refugee camps, the economics of human trafficking, and how employment law affects undocumented workers.

=== Demography ===
Studies of migration demography take a statistical approach to the size, structure, and distribution of migrant populations. One can research migrant communities either in isolation or as part of a broader population. Demographic studies of migration often consider issues such as migrant health, welfare, employment, and education in relation to the non-migrant population of a given society.

=== Public attitudes ===
Migration scholars investigate migrant reception through surveying and studying how host populations understand and respond to immigration. This might include feelings concerning refugee reception and support, considerations of multiculturalism and integration, and attitudes towards government policies. Frequently, scholars investigate how non-migrant publics consider migrants, this has resulted in a relative lack of scholarship which considers the opposite dynamic.

=== Critical border studies ===
Critical border studies explores alternatives to how territorial borders are currently imagined and operated. Part of this approach means identifying and investigating how borders function, to whose benefit these borders function, and whom such borders affect negatively. Scholars associated with critical border studies regard borders as part of a system of performances by which states maintain and exert power over territory; this intersects with understandings of sovereignty and securitization. Scholars associated with this branch of migration studies are frequently critical of how states may rely on a monopoly of force to assert governance over given territories, consequently strains of anarchist philosophy, postcolonial thought, and anti-statism are popular within critical border studies.

=== Immigration law ===
Immigration law necessarily affects many subsections of migration studies and it is consequently a point of interest for a wide range of migration scholars. One can approach the subject of immigration law through sub-national, national, and international frameworks. The study of immigration law frequently intersects with discussions of human rights.

==== Migrant il/legality and "crimmigration" ====
In common with approaches found in critical border studies, many scholars consider how systems which govern migration construct illegality and thereby criminalize migrant populations. This approach displaces the discussion of illegality from the migrant subject and instead scrutinises the behaviour of nation-state governments. Critical approaches to the construction of citizenship recur within this strand of scholarship. This approach to understanding migration is particularly relevant for scholars working on issues involving undocumented populations. The term "crimmigration" has emerged as a way to conceptualize how migrants are frequently treated as criminals, deviants, and security risks.

=== Displacement ===
==== Forced migration ====
Forced migration is the coerced movement of humans from their origin to a (frequently undesired) new destination. Studies concerning forced migration explore the processes by which people are displaced, how destination countries receive and support displaced people, and the experiences of forced migrations. Studies concerning forced migration frequently overlap with issues concerning genocide studies, settler colonialism, humanitarianism, deportation and ethnic cleansing. The term "forced" is frequently debated for its suggestion that there is a clear distinction between voluntary and involuntary human movement.

==== Refugee studies ====
Scholars focusing on refugee studies typically consider the experiences of people affected by transnational forced-migration processes. The definition of a refugee varies considerably within the refugee-studies community, with some insisting on the strict definitions of 1951 Convention Relating to the Status of Refugees and others relying on more fluid or amorphous definitions.

Refugee studies represent a distinct overarching group within migration studies as it differs significantly from the topics which are central to more voluntary phenomena such as labour-market migration. The concept of refugees as weapons is analyzed as a forced experience of a mass exodus of refugees from a state to a hostile state as a "weapon."

==== Internal displacement ====
Internally displaced persons have been compelled to move from their origin but have not crossed national boundaries. This means that they do not meet the Convention Relating to the Status of Refugees definition of a refugee, even though they may have similar experiences, and though the conditions which led to their displacement may closely resemble those which provoke refugee movements. Studies on internal displacement frequently focus on the complications raised by the fact that such migrants are not supported by the same international frameworks which can provide for refugees and other transnational migrants.

==== Climate change and environmental factors ====
Scholars increasingly study how climate change is interacting with human migration, something which is discussed to a much greater extent in relation to migrating animals. Key issues in studies of climate change and migration revolve around how climate change will affect coastal communities, small-island nations, and communities living in areas likely to become deserts. Essentially, this topic considers how climate change may cause large-scale human movement. The idea of "climate refugees" is a key focus of debate within this topic, particularly as this brings a novel category to established understandings of refugee status. Beyond climate change, there is a long history of human migration because of other environmental factors. Studies concerned with early human migrations frequently consider how humanity responded to issues such as adapting to the harsh cold of the Late Pleistocene.

=== Gender and sexuality ===
==== Gender ====
Scholars focusing on gender consider how gender structures migrant experience, the treatment and reception of migrants, and how migration interacts with the performance of gender. Contemporary treatments of migration and gender tend to take an intersectional approach where gender is part of a dynamic set of identities including class, race, age, and health. Studies which consider gendered experiences of migration look at topics such as gender-based violence against migrant populations, gendered differences in asylum and detention processes, and how family dynamics are affected by migration processes.

==== Queer migration ====
Scholars influenced by approaches from the growing field of Queer studies explore how queer sexualities affect understandings of migration. One approach involves critically engaging with "the intersectionality of nationality and sexuality, [to show] how national norms and values can be used instrumentally by social and political actors" to affect human movement. For example, topics in Queer migration might include how LGBT+ asylum seekers are differently affected by asylum processes, how discrimination against LGBT+ people affects their migration experiences, or how migrant welfare is stratified according to sexuality.

=== Humanitarianism ===
A recent trend in migration studies scholarship has been to critically evaluate how humanitarian actors interact with immigrants, particularly in the context of conflict environments, disaster relief, and crises. The refugee camp has become a significant point of interest for scholars working on the intersection of migration and humanitarianism, especially in relation to biopower. Recently, there have been increased efforts to critically engage with how humanitarian actors deliver aid and the ethics of humanitarianism in the context of migration. This criticism of humanitarian actors has led to discussions of the links between carceral systems and humanitarianism.

=== Epidemiology ===
In epidemiology, an "immigration study" is a method of understanding the relative importance of inherited genetics and environmental factor in medical conditions whose incidence varies around the world. It examines the incidence of conditions in populations who have moved (or whose recent ancestors have moved) between places at different rates. Often the immigrant population can be shown to have similar rates to the population of the new location, suggesting that environmental factors such as diet, obesity and exercise are the dominant determinants.

== The ethics of researching migration ==
Research on human migration may be used to enforce or inform the strategies of national governments and law enforcement bodies. For instance, studying how undocumented immigrants access healthcare may enable a government to clamp down on these practices, or critical studies of clandestine migration may inform border securitisation policies which might restrict those same migration flows. Furthermore, migrants frequently represent vulnerable or marginalised subjects and scholarly research into migrant groups might compound or worsen conditions for these groups. The ethics of how to navigate the tensions and questions raised by carrying out research on migration, and the consequences of investigating sensitive topics within migration studies, are becoming an increasingly discussed topic. This is part of a broader development of greater reflexivity regarding research ethics in the social sciences.

== Teaching ==
Migration studies is a relatively new specialism, consequently many universities and colleges have yet to develop degree programmes which formally address the topic. Whilst migration studies rarely exist as an available major for undergraduate study, Master's degrees which focus on migration and international movement are increasingly available. However, the availability of this focus varies greatly by region and academic culture. At present, most teaching of migration studies as a distinct topic is focused in European universities.

=== Europe ===
The International Migration Research Network (IMISCOE) is a network of institutes, primarily based in Europe, that is dedicated to scholarly research on migration. Some of the participating institutes are found at:

- University of Copenhagen
- Malmö University
- Utrecht University
- Radboud University Nijmegen
- Université de Liège
- Linköping University
- University of Neuchâtel
- Universität Osnabrück
- University of A Coruña
- University of Sussex
- University of Deusto
- University of Oxford
- Vrije Universiteit Brussel

Other universities that offer migration degrees include: Aalborg University, University of Côte d'Azur, University of Riga, University of Kent (Brussels School of International Studies) and Vrije Universiteit Brussel (Brussels school of Governance) all offer graduate training in migration studies.

As of 2017, several of these universities work collaboratively to provide a single degree which can be acquired through work at multiple participating institutions. This represents teaching in Denmark, Sweden, Norway, Germany, Belgium, the United Kingdom, the Netherlands, France, Latvia, and Spain.

=== Africa ===
Few African universities offer an explicit focus on migration studies, however programmes are available in South Africa, Egypt and Ghana. The University of the Witwatersrand offers degree programmes in migration studies at both undergraduate and graduate levels. The American University in Cairo currently offers a Master's degree in migration and refugee studies. University of Ghana runs a Master's degree and PhD programme in migration studies through their Centre for Migration Studies.

=== North America ===
==== United States ====
Universities and colleges in the United States have been slow to develop degree programmes which explicitly focus on migration studies and have lagged behind European institutions in this regard. Whilst there has been a growth in migration studies within disciplines, there has not been the same attention to interdisciplinary approaches or the establishment of migration studies as a freestanding field. PhD programmes which focus on migration studies are very rare, however, The University of San Francisco, DePaul University, and City University of New York offer terminal Master's degrees in migration studies. Migration studies are increasingly available as an undergraduate minor-subject, with the University of California San Diego among the first to offer such a minor. Since 2015, the University of California Los Angeles also offers a minor in International Migration Studies. Much teaching on international migration in the United States is instead framed as ethnic studies, Latin American studies. or Border Studies. Migration is also frequently available as a specialisation within sociology, economics, and political science degree programmes. Diasporic identity and the history and consequences of human movement are also extensively explored in African American studies or Africana studies programmes.

==== Canada ====
In Canada, Ryerson University (now Toronto Metropolitan University) has developed a graduate programme in Immigration and Settlement studies whereas Carleton University offers an undergraduate degree in Migration and Diaspora Studies. Similarly to the situation in the United States, Canadian universities frequently address the study of migration as a topic within other disciplines rather than as a field in its own right. Thus, whilst there may be few programmes which explicitly address migration in their titles, there is still a broad range on research and teaching on the topic through other avenues.

=== South and Central America ===
Few universities in South and Central America offer named programmes in migration studies. In Mexico, Universidad Iberoamericana co-delivers a Master's programme with the University of San Francisco through an optional exchange semester.

=== Asia ===
==== West Asia ====
In Turkey, Ankara University, Ankara Social Sciences University, TED University, TOBB University of Economics and Technology, Bursa Uludag University, Istanbul University, and Karadeniz Technical University all offer master's degrees in Migration Studies. Gaziantep University has a "Migration Institute", with Women's Studies, Migration Studies, Migrant and Immigrant Health, Urbanization and Social Integration, Urban Studies, and Migrant Education departments; offering master's degrees in all of them. Akdeniz University in Antalya offers a master's degree in Mediterranean Migration Studies.

Israel's Tel Aviv University offers a terminal master's degree in Global Migration & Policy.

==== South Asia ====
Central University of Gujarat offers a Master's and PhD in Diaspora studies. In the Philippines, Miriam College offers an MA in migration studies. In Nepal, migration is included in the graduate programmes in population studies at Tribhuvan University. Similarly, in Sri Lanka at the University of Colombo the graduate programs in demography give significant attention to the study of migration. National University of Singapore has a migration studies research cluster located in its Faculty of Arts and Social Sciences, however, does not offer a degree programme on this topic.

==== East Asia ====
Similarly, the Chinese University of Hong Kong hosts a research centre on migration and mobility but does not operate a degree programme. In Russia, no university offers a degree in migration studies, however, the Higher School of Economics organises a regular seminar on migration studies through its Institute for Social Policy. In China, Peking University's Department of Sociology organises seminars on migration studies.

=== Antipodes ===
==== Australia ====
The University of Melbourne offers graduate training in migration studies through an interdisciplinary PhD programme. The Australian Catholic University has developed a graduate diploma in Australian Migration Law and Practice. The University of Sydney and University of Queensland do not offer degree programmes in migration studies, however both universities have dedicated research clusters and teach modules on topics within migration studies.

==== New Zealand ====
Victoria University Wellington offers a Master's programme in Migration Studies, alongside a postgraduate diploma, or postgraduate certificate. The Centre for Global Migrations at University of Otago addresses issues and themes in migration studies, and The University of Waikato used to host a Migration Research Group from 1993 to 2009, neither university offers a degree in migration studies.

== Research activity, publications, and outreach ==
=== Journals ===
As a rapidly growing field of study, there are numerous journals dedicated to migration studies. The following titles explicitly focus on migration studies, most are peer-reviewed.

- The Journal of Ethnic and Migration Studies, is based at the University of Sussex.
- Crossings: Journal of Migration & Culture is published by Intellect
- Citizenship Studies is published by Taylor & Francis.
- Forced Migration Review is based at Oxford University.
- International Journal of Migration and Border Studies
- Migration Studies, is published by Oxford University Press. The first issue was released in March 2013.
- (Re)pensir L'exil
- Transit addresses migration in the German speaking world.
- Nordic Journal of Migration Research gives priority to migration in a Nordic context.
- Mobilities addresses movements of peoples, objects, capital and information at both a large and small scale.
- Refugee Survey Quarterly takes a policy-oriented approach to forced migration issues.
- Global Networks addresses social scientific understandings of globalization and transnationalism.
- "Journal of Migration Affairs" is bi-annual, online, peer-reviewed journal brought out by the Tata Institute of Social Sciences, India.
- "International Migration" is a peer-reviewed journal, covering the field of policy relevance in international migration. Research focusing on migration cycle’ from origin, transit, host, destination, and return and reintegration are relevant to the journal.

=== Conferences ===
- IMISCOE is a large European research network which focuses on migration and integration issues. It hosts yearly conferences alongside smaller events throughout the year.

=== Research Centres ===
- The Centre for Advanced Migration Studies is based at The University of Copenhagen.
- The Edinburgh Centre For Global History is based at The University of Edinburgh and has a Migration, Slavery, and Diaspora Studies hub.
- The Global Refugee Studies Research Group is based at The University of Aalborg.
- The Yale Center for the Study of Race, Indigeneity, and Transnational Migration is based at Yale University.
- The Research Environment Migration, Ethnicity and Society (REMESO) is based at Linköping University.
- The Migration Observatory and 'COMPAS' are based at Oxford University.
- The African Centre for Migration & Society is based at the University of Witwatersand.
- The Sydney Asia-Pacific Migration Centre is based at the University of Sydney and focuses on the Asia-Pacific region.
- The Malmö Institute for Studies of Migration, Diversity and Welfare is based at Malmö University.
- The Migration Research Unit is based in University College London's Geography department.
- The Centre for Migration and Diaspora Studies is based at The School of Oriental and African Studies :University of London.
- The Migration Research Unit is based at the London School of Economics.
- The Global Migration Centre is based at The University of Geneva's Graduate Institute.
- The Asian Research Center for Migration is based at Chulalongkorn University in Thailand.
- The Refugee and Migratory Movements Research Unit is based at University of Dhaka in Bangladesh.
- The Forced Migration Research Network is based at University of New South Wales.
- The Center for Comparative Immigration Studies is based at the University of California San Diego
- The Center for the Study of International Migration at the University of California Los Angeles
- The Migration Research Center (MiReKoc) at Koç University.
- The Center for Migration Research at Istanbul Bilgi University.
- The Migration and Integration Research Center at Turkish-German University

=== Think Tanks ===
The following think tanks address issues which overlap with migration studies.

- Migration Policy Institute is based in Washington, D.C. and addresses issues related to migration in North America.
- Center for Immigration Studies is an anti-immigration think tank based in Washington, D.C.
- Pew Research Center: Hispanic Trends addresses issues surrounding Latin American immigration to the United States.
- Hope Border Institute is an organisation in El Paso that brings perspectives from Catholic social teaching to the topic of migration and borders.
- Göç Araştırmaları Vakfı (GAV) (lit. 'Migration Studies Foundation') is a vakıf in Ankara that focuses on the issues of Turkish and Muslim diasporas.
- Göç Araştırmaları Derneği (GAR) (lit. 'Migration Studies Association') is an association in İstanbul that takes a critical and rights based approach to migration to support migration research and expose the violations of migrant rights.

== Notable Academics ==
- Graeme Hugo (1946 – 2015), an Australian demographer and geographer. Professor of geography at University of Adelaide.
- Richard Alba (b.1942) is an American sociologist and Distinguished Professor at the Graduate Center, CUNY. Known for landmark work on cultural assimilation.
- Nancy Foner is an American sociologist at Hunter College, CUNY. She has served as Chair of the International Migration Section of the American Sociological Association.
- Douglas Massey (b.1952) is an American sociologist at Princeton University who has written extensively on international immigration.
- Hein de Haas is a Dutch sociologist and Professor of Sociology at the University of Amsterdam. His research concentrates on the relationship between migration and social transformation and development in origin and destination countries.
- Guillermina Jasso is an American sociologist at New York University who has primarily focused on international migration to the United States.
- Mae Ngai is an American historian and Lung Family Professor of Asian American Studies and professor of history at Columbia University. Impossible Subjects is her landmark study on undocumented migration in the United States.
- Roger Waldinger is an American sociologist and Professor of Sociology at the University of California Los Angeles, and the founding director of UCLA's Center for the Study of International Migration. His research focuses on the causes and consequences of population movements across borders.
- Ricard Zapata-Barrero (b. 1965) is a Spanish scholar of migration studies, specializing in migration governance, citizenship, and diversity. He is a professor at the Department of Political and Social Sciences, Universitat Pompeu Fabra, and the director of the GRITIM-UPF Interdisciplinary Research Group on Immigration at Universitat Pompeu Fabra.
