= Ricard Zapata Barrero =

Scholar of migration studies

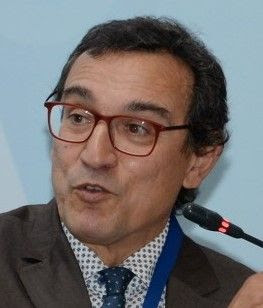
Photo of Zapata-Barrero

Ricard Zapata-Barrero (born 12 November 1965) is a scholar of migration studies, specializing in migration governance, citizenship, and diversity. He is a full professor at the Department of Political and Social Sciences, Universitat Pompeu Fabra, and the director of the Interdisciplinary Research Group on Immigration (GRITIM-UPF).

== Early life and education ==
Zapata-Barrero was born in 1965 in Sabadell (Barcelona, Catalonia, Spain). He is the son of a political refugee under the Francoist regime. At the age of seven, together with his mother and two sisters, he crossed The Portbou border with a family false passport and spent his childhood in Paris, France. Once there, he helped to organize the Spanish diaspora, learnt from his father political activities against the francoist regime and followed critically the democratic transition. In 1984, he returned to Spain to study philosophy at the Autonomous University in Barcelona. In 1989, he studied in Paris at Ecole des Hautes Etudes, with Pierre Bourdieu, Luc Boltanski and Raymond Boudon, where he obtained a Diplôme d'études Approfondies (DEA). In 1996, he completed his Ph.D. at the Autonomous University of Barcelona.

Afterwards, he went to the University of Caen (with Luc Ferry and Alain Renaut) and the University of Leeds (with David Beetham). He then spent the next year at the Universities of Political Science in Berlin and Munich and attended courses at the Otto-Suhr-Institut of Political Science (OSI) of the Freie Universitat Berlin. In 1996, Ricard completed his Ph.D. at the Barcelona Autonomous University with a research entitled Ciudadanía, Democracia, y Pluralismo Cultural: Hacia un Nuevo Contrato Social (Citizenship, Democracy, and Cultural Pluralism: towards a new social contract), published by Editorial Anthropos in 2001.

== Career ==
Ricard Zapata-Barrero is a full professor at the Department of Political and Social Sciences, Universitat Pompeu Fabra, Barcelona, Spain. Since 2011, he has been the director of the Master's degree in Migration studies at the university. He is a founder and coordinator of the Euro-Mediterranean Research Network on Migration (EuroMedMig), an independent interdisciplinary research network on migration and diversity in the Mediterranean. Since 2017, he has been a board member of the International Migration and Social Cohesion (IMISCOE) in Europe and the chair of its external affairs committee.

Through his publications, his main fields of research are: borders and human mobility, diversity and citizenship, and methodology in migration studies.

== Academia ==
In the last few years, Zapata-Barrero has been engaged in the normative debate on interculturalism. He is also promoting the development of migration studies in the Mediterranean region, and deepening the research on Urban Migration Governance. Regarding the latter, he has contributed to framing the local turn in migration studies and this track of research from urban politics As an Applied Political Theorist, he is promoting interdisciplinary knowledge on immigration, combining theory and case studies, and following contextual, conceptual, normative, and interpretive approaches. His academic research has often explored the research-policy-society nexus so that his findings can contribute to social and political change.

== Selected bibliography ==
- Zapata-Barrero, R. (2019). Intercultural citizenship in the post-multicultural era. London, Sage Swifts Publishing. DOI: https://dx.doi.org/10.4135/9781526498465
- Zapata-Barrero, R., & Rezaei, S. (2019). Diaspora governance and transnational entrepreneurship: the rise of an emerging social global pattern in migration studies. Journal of Ethnic and Migration Studies, 46(10), 1959-1973. DOI: https://doi.org/10.1080/1369183X.2018.1559990. Special Issue (2019) and Edited Book (2022). This Special Issue has become an edited Book in 2022 (Routledge Research in Ethnic and Migration Studies – ISBN 978-1-032-04953-3).
- Zapata-Barrero, R., & Yalaz, E. (2018). Qualitative research in European migration studies. Springer Nature. DOI: https://doi.org/10.1007/978-3-319-76861-8
- Zapata-Barrero, R. (2018). Applied Political Theory and Qualitative Research in Migration Studies in R. Zapata-Barrero and E. Yalaz (eds) Qualitative Research in European Migration Studies, Amsterdam: Springer (IMISCOE Research Series); pages 75–92. DOI: https://doi.org/10.1007/978-3-319-76861-8
- Zapata-Barrero, R., Dähnke, I., & Markard, L. (Eds.). (2018). Immigrant incorporation in political parties: Exploring the diversity gap. Routledge. ISBN 978-0367234935.
- Zapata-Barrero, R. (2017). Interculturalism in the post-multicultural debate: a defence. Comparative Migration Studies, 5(1). DOI:10.1186/s40878-017-0057-z
- Zapata-Barrero, R., Caponio, T., & Scholten, P. (2017). Symposium on Theorizing ‘The Local Turn’ in the Governance of Immigrant Policies: A Multi-level Approach. International Review of Administrative Sciences, 83(2), 204. DOI: https://doi.org/10.1177/0020852316688426
