= University of Copenhagen Faculty of Law =

Coordinates: 55°40′45.44″N 12°34′11.51″E

Faculty of Law
- Det juridiske fakultet
- Type: Public university
- Established: 1479
- Dean: Professor Jacob Graff Nielsen
- Students: 4000
- Address: Karen Blixens Plads 16, 2300, Copenhagen, Denmark
- Campus: South Campus
- Affiliations: EUA, LAOTSE, IARU
- Website: www.jur.ku.dk/english/

The Faculty of Law (Det juridiske fakultet) at the University of Copenhagen has two departments including a number of research centres and prepares students for the Bachelor of Law degree (BA) and the profession degree in Law, cand. jur. (candidatus (masculinum) or candidata (femininum) juris). The faculty runs a special library, known as the Law Laboratory, for students.

== The Faculty ==
The Faculty of Law at the University of Copenhagen is Denmark's largest law school, and one of the largest in Northern Europe, with approximately 4,000 law students. One of the main objectives of the faculty is to intensify contacts with foreign universities and law schools. These contacts have greatly increased in recent years. They include such activities as encouraging research and studies abroad, international student exchanges, faculty exchanges and a developing programme for visiting scholars.

The Faculty of Law at the University of Copenhagen has existed since 1479 when the University was founded. The instituting statute founding the Faculty is still preserved in the archives of the Danish Royal Library. The University of Copenhagen is the largest university in Scandinavia and the only Scandinavian university ranked among the top 50 universities worldwide. The Faculty of Law of the Royal Frederick University in Norway, established in 1811 as the second law faculty in then-Denmark-Norway, was based on the curriculum of the University of Copenhagen Faculty of Law and retained strong similarities until recently.

The Faculty's research covers a wide range of topics. Additionally, the Faculty has a number of research centres:

- CECS: Centre for Comparative and European Constitutional Studies
- Centre for Pension Law
- Centre for Studies in Legal Culture
- FOCOFIMA - Forum for Company Law and Financial Market Law
- WELMA - Legal Studies in Welfare and EU Market Integration
- Centre for Information and Innovation Law (CIIR)
- iCourts - The Danish National Research Foundation's Centre of Excellence for International Courts

== Seal ==
The seal of the faculty contains the following text

Sigillum Facultatis Iuridicæ Universitatis Hafniensis	Seal of the Faculty of Law The University of Copenhagen

which is written in a circle around a lindworm above which is a sceptre and a sword. The lindworm symbolizes the struggle against evil, while the sceptre is the power of the state and the sword is justice.

The seal is based on the seal given to the Faculty by the King in 1531.

== Law Programmes ==
The Faculty of Law offers 4 different degrees

LLB LLM	Master in Mediation and Conflict Resolution PhD

The second degree of the law programme (LLM) takes a minimum of two years to complete. In Danish, the degree, which is awarded after a minimum of five years' of undergraduate and graduate studies, is called the candidatus or candidata juris, commonly shortened to cand.jur. This degree is equivalent to a master's degree. The official length of the programme is 120 ECTS Credits.

The PhD course is a three-year researcher training course. During this period the Ph.D. student must attend courses, acquire teaching experience and take part in the research environment at other universities. Admission is on an individual basis and subject to an overall evaluation of the project and personal qualifications of the applicant. Only a limited number of applicants are accepted, depending on the financial resources available and other criteria such as counselling facilities. The most important aspect of the PhD course of studies is the preparation of a written thesis that forms the basis of the award of a PhD degree after an oral public defence (viva). Subject to academic merit PhD theses are published by the publishing house Jurist- og Økonomforbundets Forlag.

The master in Mediation and Conflict Resolution is part of the Faculty's continuing education programme.
