= The New Americans: Economic, Demographic, and Fiscal Effects of Immigration =

1997 study

The New Americans: Economic, Demographic, and Fiscal Effects of Immigration is a 1997 study on the demographic, economic, and fiscal consequences of immigration to the United States by the National Research Council (NRC) of the National Academy of Sciences. The NRC report found that although immigrants, especially those from Latin America, were a net cost in terms of taxes paid versus social services received, overall immigration was a net economic gain due to an increase in pay for higher-skilled workers, lower prices for goods and services produced by immigrant labor, and more efficiency and lower wages for some owners of capital. The report also notes that although immigrant workers compete with domestic workers for some low skilled jobs, some immigrants specialize in activities that otherwise would not exist in an area, and thus are performing services that otherwise would not exist, and thus can be beneficial for all domestic residents. U.S. Census Bureau's Survey of Business Owners: Hispanic-Owned Firms: 2002 indicated that the number of Hispanic-owned businesses in the United States grew to nearly 1.6 million in 2002. Those Hispanic-owned businesses generated about $222 billion in revenue. The report notes that the burden of poor immigrants is not born equally among states, and is most heavy in California.

On the poor end of the spectrum, the "New Americans" report found that low-skill low wage immigration does not, on aggregate, lower the wages of most domestic workers. The report also addresses the question of if immigration affects black Americans differently from the population in general: "While some have suspected that blacks suffer disproportionately from the inflow of low-skilled immigrants, none of the available evidence suggests that they have been particularly hard-hit on a national level. Some have lost their jobs, especially in places where immigrants are concentrated. But the majority of blacks live elsewhere, and their economic fortunes are tied to other factors."

== Background ==
In 1990 the U.S. Congress appointed a bipartisan Commission on Immigration Reform to review the nation's policies and laws and to recommend changes. In turn, the commission in 1995 asked the National Research Council of the National Academy of Sciences to convene a panel of experts to assess the demographic, economic, and fiscal consequences of immigration.

The panel was asked to lay a scientific foundation for policymaking on some specific Immigration issues. The National Academy of Sciences panels charge was to address three key questions:

1. What is the effect of immigration on the future size and composition of the U.S. population?
2. What is the influence of immigration on the overall economy?
3. What is the fiscal impact of immigration on federal, state, and local governments?

The National Academy of Sciences report by these 15+ researchers was issued after 3 years study and called "The New Americans: Economic, Demographic, and Fiscal Effects of Immigration" (1997) Edited by James P. Smith and Barry Edmonston, ISBN 0-309-06356-6. The book is available on line at .

== Criticism ==
Negative Population Growth, an organization that advocates a gradual reduction in U.S. and world population, has criticized the NPR/NSF panel for addressing only the economic effects of immigration mostly in terms of labor, prices and economic growth and should have included an environmental impact statement including a lot wider spectrum of specialists like environmentalists, fishery experts, biologists, educators, ethicists, labor experts etc. The report did find that the least skilled Americans have suffered the most from the competition with immigrants and that African Americans and legalized Hispanics with their lower average levels of education have been harmed the most, but it dismissed that as a serious problem because less than a majority of U.S. citizens are directly affected. The NSF panel did find that immigration may lower some prices (~0.1% on average) but lower prices require the assumption of generally lower wages for some or of higher investment levels in industry which is precisely what cheap wage immigration discourages. Many studies escape from this dilemma, if that is the word, by resorting to the familiar argument that immigrants fill "jobs American won't take." They ignored the fact that, nationwide, all the job categories: even farm workers, service industries, construction etc. are still filled largely by Americans. The so-called shortage of labor to fill some of them and the reason that hourly U.S. real wages have been falling almost every year since 1975 is that desperate immigrants will work for wages that Americans don't want to work for. Even the NSF study seems to assume that increased GDP is a net good ignoring the fact that the lower wages and lower taxes collected from the typical illegal immigrant result in a lower GDP/capita. The reason that many like illegal immigrants is that they typically work cheaper than natives, have few legal rights, are pliant and much of their "real" costs can be spread out to anonymous taxpayers. All these effects of most immigration is not most Americans idea of "...Beneficial to U.S.".

"As long as there is a virtually unlimited supply of potential immigrants, the nation must make choices on how many to admit and who they should be." National Research Council, National Academy of Sciences, 1997.

== See also ==
- An Essay on the Principle of Population
- Economic impact of illegal immigrants in the United States
- Economic impact of immigration to Canada
- Economic results of migration
- Illegal immigration to the United States
- Immigration to the United States
