= University of Copenhagen Faculty of Theology =

Coordinates: 55°40′51″N 12°34′38″E

Faculty of Theology
- Det Teologiske fakultet
- Type: Public university
- Established: 1479
- Dean: Steffen Kjeldgaard-Pedersen
- Students: 1000
- Location: Copenhagen, Denmark
- Campus: City Campus
- Affiliations: EUA, LAOTSE
- Website: www.teol.ku.dk/english/

The Copenhagen Faculty of Theology is the smallest faculty at the University of Copenhagen, with three departments and the affiliated Centre for African Studies. The disciplines offered are: Biblical Exegesis, Church History, Dogmatics, Ethics and Philosophy of Religion. The Faculty runs the Søren Kierkegaard Library and the Søren Kierkegaard Research Centre. The Centre for Christianity and the Arts is a unit under the Department of Church History. The Faculty prepares students for the master's degree in Theology.
