= Knickerbocker =

Knickerbocker or Knickerbockers may refer to:

== Arts and media ==
=== Music ===
- The Knickerbockers, an American music group best known for their 1965 hit "Lies"
- The Knickerbockers, an alias of Ben Selvin and His Orchestra
- "Knickerbocker", a 2008 song by Fujiya & Miyagi

=== Publications ===
- The Knickerbocker (1833–1865), a literary magazine
- Knickerbocker News, a newspaper in Albany, New York, published between 1843 and 1988

== Buildings and infrastructure ==
=== New York ===
- Knickerbocker Avenue (BMT Myrtle Avenue Line), a subway station in New York City
- Knickerbocker Field Club, a tennis clubhouse in Flatbush, Brooklyn
- Knickerbocker and Arnink Garages, two stone buildings in Albany
- Knickerbocker Mansion, Schaghticoke
- Knickerbocker Hospital, Harlem, closed in 1979
- Knickerbocker Village, a housing project in New York City
- United States Post Office–Knickerbocker Station, a post office in New York City
- Times Union Center, formerly the Knickerbocker Arena, Albany

=== Elsewhere ===
- Knickerbocker (Spokane, Washington), a building
- Knickerbocker Apartments (Kansas City, Missouri), demolished in 2020
- Knickerbocker Building (New Rochelle, New York), an industrial building
- Knickerbocker Bicycle Bridge, a bridge across the Willamette River in Eugene, Oregon

== Businesses and organizations ==
=== Sports teams ===
- New York Knicks (short for "Knickerbockers"), a National Basketball Association team
- Knickerbocker Athletic Club football team, an early-20th-century American football team
- Knickerbocker Base Ball Club of New York, one of the first baseball teams
- Warwickshire Knickerbockers, a cricket team that participated in first game of cricket in France

=== Social organizations ===
- Knickerbocker Club, a private male-only social club in New York City
- Knickerbocker Greys, a youth cadet corps located in Manhattan founded in 1881
- Knickerbocker Sailing Association, a gay, lesbian, bisexual, and transgender sailing club in New York City
- Knickerbocker Yacht Club, a defunct yacht club in Port Washington, New York

=== Other businesses ===
- Hollywood Knickerbocker Hotel, now Hollywood Knickerbocker Apartments
- The Knickerbocker Hotel, New York City
- Knickerbocker Hotel (Milwaukee, Wisconsin)
- Knickerbocker Ice Company, based in New York State during the 19th century
- Knickerbocker Press, a division of publisher G. P. Putnam's Sons
- Knickerbocker Theatre (Broadway)
- Knickerbocker Theatre (Washington, D.C.)
- Knickerbocker Trust Company, a bank whose failure triggered the Panic of 1907

== People ==
- Knickerbocker (surname), including a list of people and a fictional character with the surname or pen name
- An obsolete nickname for Anglo-Dutch "old line" families of New York City, Manhattan's elite or residents of New York City

== Other uses ==
- Knickerbockers (clothing), baggy knee trousers
- USS Knickerbocker (SP-479), a US Navy tug, minesweeper, and dispatch ship in commission from 1917 to 1919
- Knickerbocker glory, a layered ice cream sundae from the US and UK
- Knickerbocker (Zamboanga), an ice cream dessert with various fresh fruits from the Philippines
- Knickerbocker, a New York Central train from St. Louis to New York City and Boston
- Knickerbocker, Texas, an unincorporated community
- Knickerbocker Stakes, a horse race at Belmont Park

== See also ==
- Knickerbocker Case, a 1940s investigation of antisemitism at the City College of New York
- Knickerbocker Crisis, a financial crisis in the US in 1907
- Knickerbocker Group, consisting of Washington Irving and other frequent contributors to The Knickerbocker literary magazine
- Knickerbocker Rules, early rules of American baseball
- Knickerbocker storm, a 1922 blizzard
- SKDKnickerbocker, a public affairs and consulting firm
