= Knickerbocker Hotel =

Knickerbocker Hotel may refer to:

- Hollywood Knickerbocker Hotel, Los Angeles, California
- The Knickerbocker Hotel, New York City
- Knickerbocker Hotel (Milwaukee, Wisconsin)
