= A. H. Raskin =

American journalist

A.H. Raskin
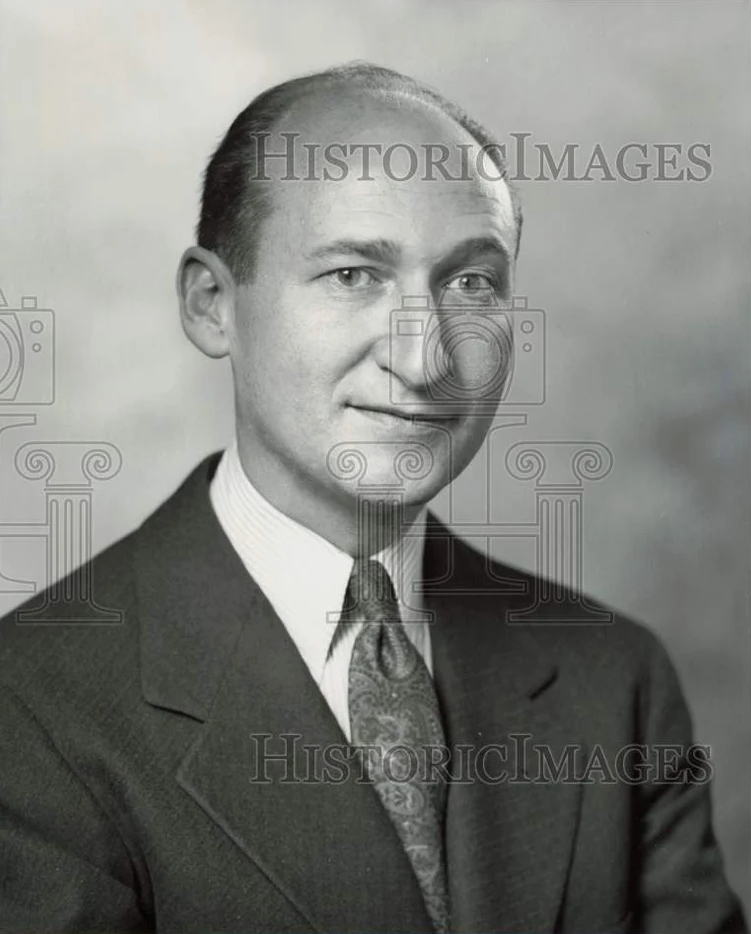
- Raskin c. 1954
- Born: Abraham Henry Raskin; April 26, 1911; Edmonton, Alberta
- Died: December 22, 1993 (aged 82); New York City, New York
- Education: City College of New York
- Occupations: Journalist, editor
- Years active: 1934–1977
- Employer: New York Times
- Known for: Labor beat

Abraham Henry Raskin (April 26, 1911 – December 22, 1993), known as A. H. Raskin, was a Canadian-born labor reporter, editorial writer, and assistant editor of The New York Times from 1934 to 1977.

== Background ==
Abraham Henry Raskin was born in Edmonton, Alberta, on April 26, 1911. His family was visiting Berlin during the hyperinflation; they settled in New York City. He was educated at Townsend Harris Hall.

He graduated from City College in education and government, Phi Beta Kappa, in 1931; he was president of the senior class. As a student at City College, Raskin wrote for the campus newspaper, The Campus, becoming its editor. He also edited the yearbook and literary magazine.

== Career ==
After graduating from college, Raskin was a campus correspondent for the New York Times for some time before joining the paper as a reporter in March 1934.

At the paper, Raskin was a labor reporter who covered many significant episodes in American labor history. For example, at the death of Sidney Hillman, founder and president of the Amalgamated Clothing Workers of America as well as head of the CIO-PAC and state chairman of the American Labor Party (ALP), Raskin wrote, "Mr. Hillman's death was expected to make more difficult the maintenance of the uneasy political alliance between the regular Democratic party organization and the coalition of liberal and labor groups exemplified by the CIO-PAC." Further, he wrote, "Hillman was the balancing wheel, keeping in line the increasingly restive Communist minority in the CIO and its group in the ALP, as well as others who were demanding political action independent of the Democratic Party." In effect, when Raskin predicted that the "left would likely push harder for an independent party", he predicted the expulsion of the communist-affiliated Lee Pressman and Len De Caux from the CIO as they favored the Progressive Party of Henry A. Wallace in 1948 over the mainstream CIO's support for Harry S. Truman.

During World War II, Raskin left the paper for a time to become chief of the War Department's industrial services division. During his tenure, he oversaw the temporary seizure of Montgomery Ward during a labor conflict between the company's workers and the company's president and CEO, Sewell Avery. Raskin was discharged from the Army as a lieutenant colonel in 1946.

After returning the New York Times, Raskin became known for his reporting on the New York newspaper strike of 1962-63. He became a member of the newspaper's editorial board in 1961 and assistant editor of the editorial page in 1964. He retired from the New York Times in 1977 and later served as editor of the Journal of International Labor Affairs, a publication of the U.S. Department of Labor.

== Personal life and death ==
Raskin suffered a stroke in 1990 and died on December 22, 1993, in Manhattan, aged 82.

== Awards ==
- 1950 The Hillman Prize
- 1963 George Polk Award
- Page One Award from The Newspaper Guild
- Society of Silurians, award

== Quotes ==
Of all the institutions in our inordinately complacent society, none is so addicted as the press to self-righteousness, self-satisfaction and self-congratulation.

== Works ==
Books, pamphlets written

- Is Communism Un-American: Nine Questions about the Communist Party Answered (1947)
- Walter Reuther's Great Big Union (1963)

Books introduced

- Toil and Trouble: A History of American Labor (1964)
- David Dubinsky: a life with labor (1977)

Books contributed

- Our Fair City (1979))
- Views on employment statistics from the press, business, labor and Congress: reports (1979))

Articles (scholarly)

- "Labor's Legislative Goals", Labor History (1963)
- "Dubinsky: Herald of Change", Labor History (1968)
