= Robert E. Paaswell =

American civil engineer

Robert E. Paaswell is an American civil engineer and the current Distinguished Professor at the Grove School of Engineering, City College of New York. He previously served as the interim president of the City College of New York and CEO of the Chicago Transit Authority.

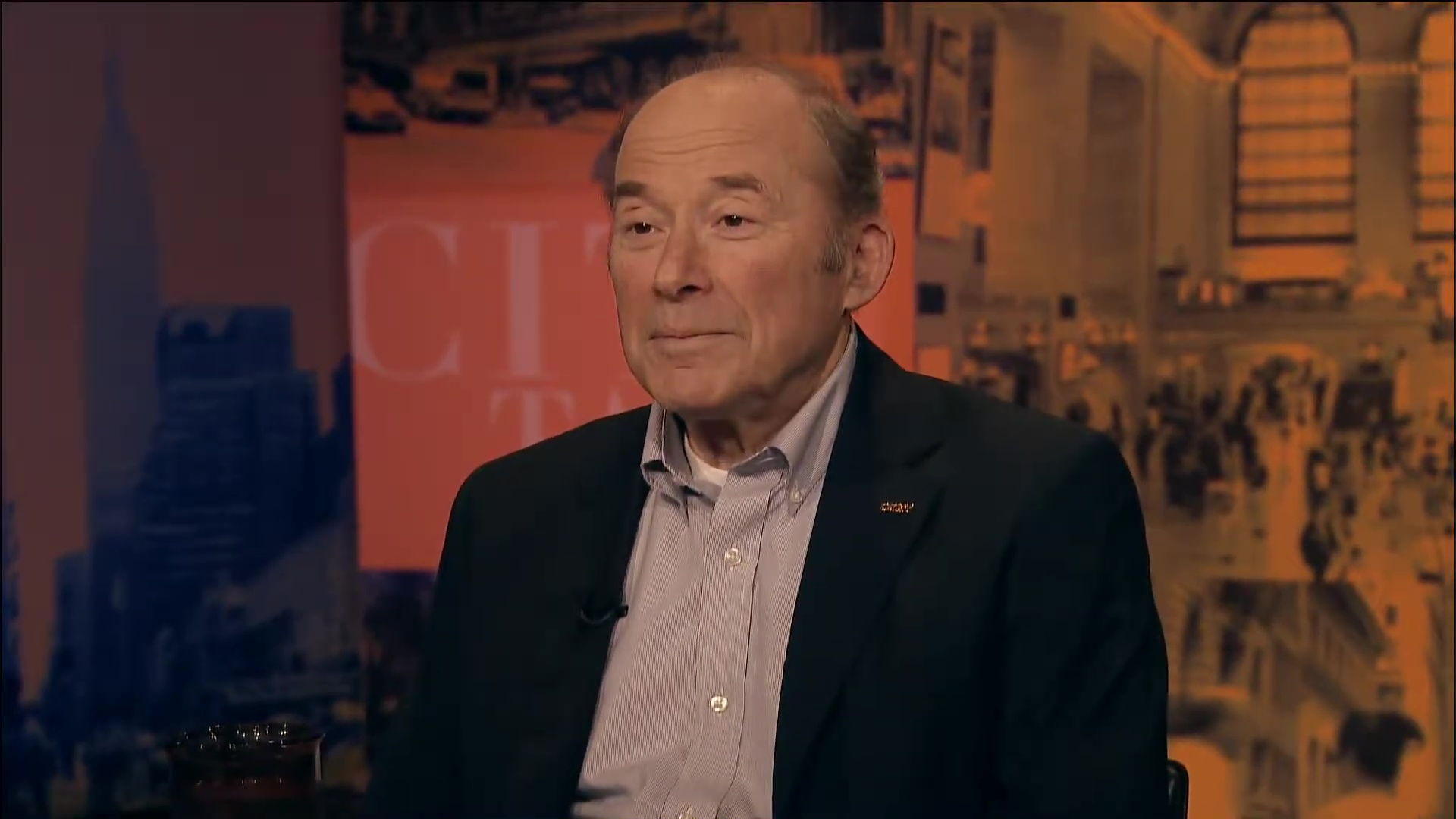
Paaswell on CUNY TV's City Talk, 2015

== Education ==
He graduated from Columbia College in 1956 and from Columbia School of Engineering and Applied Science in 1957. He received a M.S from Columbia in 1962 and a Ph.D. from Rutgers University.

== Career ==
From 1964 to 1982, he was a professor at the State University of New York at Buffalo, where he helped establish the Center for Transportation Studies and Research. He was also the chair of SUNY-Buffalo's urban planning department. From 1982 to 1986 he chaired the Urban Transportation Center at the University of Illinois. From 1986 to 1989, he served as the CEO of the Chicago Transit Authority, the second largest public transportation system in the U.S.

From 2009 to 2010, he was the interim president of the City College of New York. From 1990, he has been a director of the University Transportation Research Center at City College of New York and is now director emeritus.

== Personal life ==
He is married to Rosalind Paaswell, Chicago's first deputy commissioner for economic development and the couple have a son and a daughter.
