= Lisa Staiano-Coico =

American microbiologist (born 1956)

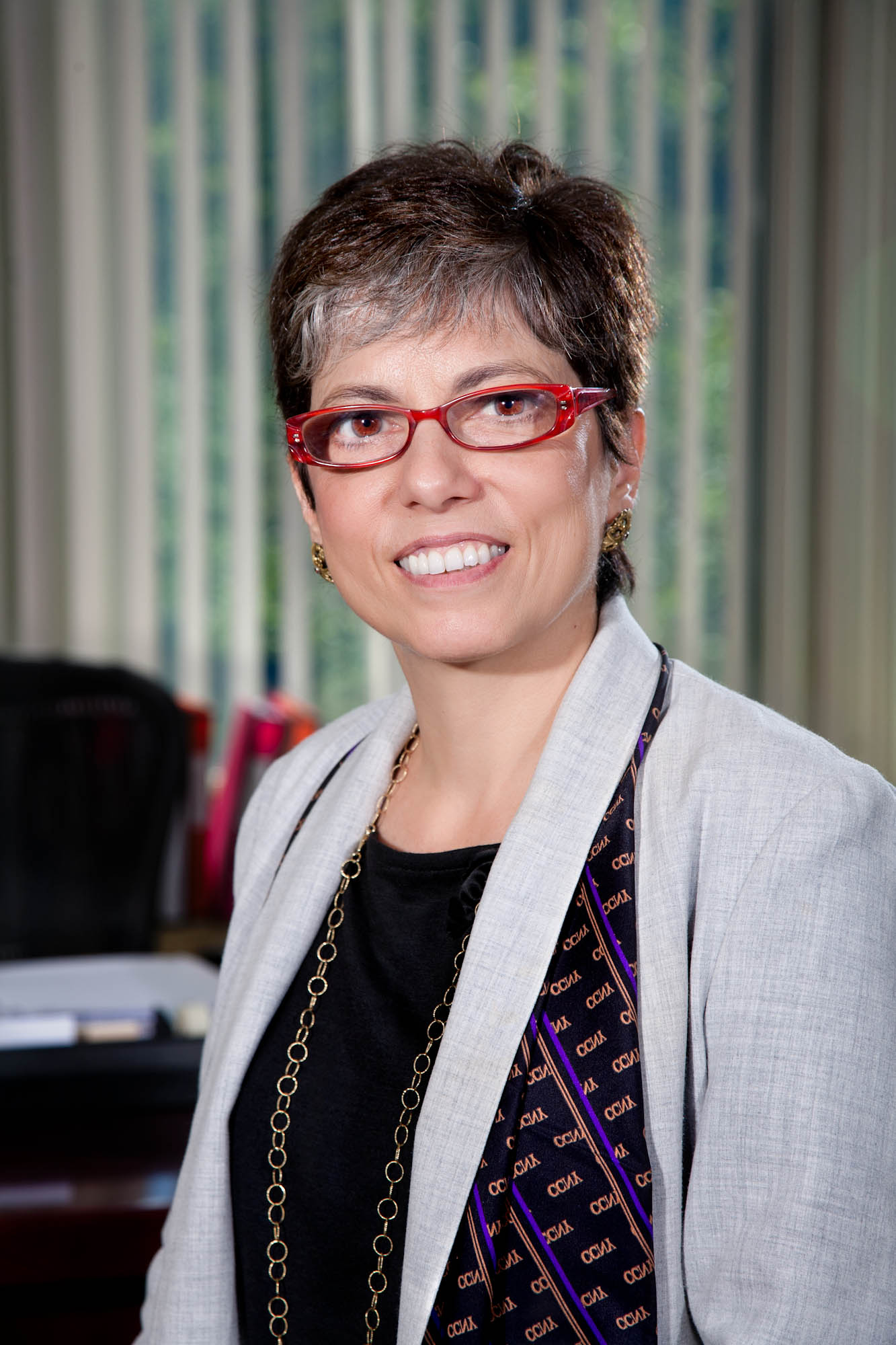
- Coico in August 2010

12th President of the City College of the City University of New York
- In office August 2010 – October 4, 2016
- Preceded by: Gregory Howard Williams
- Succeeded by: Vincent G. Boudreau

Personal details
- Born: February 26, 1956 (age 70) Brooklyn, New York, U.S.
- Education: Brooklyn College (BS); Cornell University (PhD)
- Scientific career
- Fields: Biology; Microbiology
- Thesis: Lymphocyte proliferation in old and young humans as measured by flow cytometry: effect of tritium-labeled thymidine on cell cycle kinetics (1981)

Lisa Frances Staiano-Coico (born February 26, 1956) is an American microbiologist. She served as the 12th president of the City College of the City University of New York from 2010 to 2016.

A graduate of Brooklyn College 1976, Coico became the first City University of New York alumna appointed to head the City College of New York. Coico resigned on October 7, 2016, amidst federal and state investigations into her finances.

== Education and training ==
Coico received a Bachelor of Science degree from Brooklyn College of The City University of New York in 1976, and a Ph.D. from the Weill Medical College of Cornell University in 1981.

At GSMS, Coico worked as a student research assistant and studied with the known cell biologist Zbyszek Darzynkiewicz, a professor of biochemistry and researcher of cell differentiation and carcinogenesis, and flow cytometry techniques for characterizing epithelial differentiation. Coico also studied with Myron Melamed, a GSMC professor of biology and scientist with an international reputation, who had co-authored the seminal cytometry publication in Science, "Spectrophotometer: New Instruments for Ultra-rapid Cell Analysis," with Louis Kamentsky of Columbia University's IBM Watson Laboratory and Marc E. Weksler, a professor of medicine and eventual Irving Sherwood Wright Professor of Geriatrics at Weill Cornell.

In graduate school, Coico participated in faculty sponsored research in teaching laboratory settings, such as the Laboratory of Investigative Cytology and the Walker Laboratory in Rye, New York. From 1981 to 1983, Coico held post-doctoral researcher fellowships at GSMS-affiliated Sloan-Kettering Institute.

== Early career ==
In 1985, Coico joined Cornell University Medical College and Weill Cornell Graduate School of Medical Sciences, as an instructor in the department of surgery, participating in research activities. From 1986, Coico held the rank of assistant professor, associate professor from 1990, and clinical professor (additional faculty) from 1995 to 2004.

=== Overview of research activities ===
Upon completing postdoctoral training, Coico's stated interests were to study the use of flow cytometry to detect risks for colo-rectal cancer (1985), and the growth and differentiation of epithelial cells (1990). and wound repair (1999).

In the mid-1980s, Coico joined a broad bench to bedside research team, spearheaded by the biomedical research scientist John M. Hefton, M.D., a pioneering skin grafting researcher and the innovator of new techniques for the treatment of burn victims.

In 2009, she advised Human Ecology undergraduates conducting survey research on the effectiveness of campus-based alcohol education.

=== Beginning of administrative career ===
In addition to teaching, Coico served for one-year as Cornell Medical College associate dean to Donald A. Fischman, from 1996 to 1997, and GSMS senior associate dean of research, from March 1997, responsible for the coordinate of graduate fellowships. For a year, Coico held the positions of GSMS vice-provost of external affairs, government agencies, and professional associations, in 2003–2004, and she was briefly the director of Tri-Institutional MD-PhD Program, a cooperative alliance between Cornell University, Memorial Sloan-Kettering Cancer Center and Rockefeller University.

While at Cornell, Coico was an outspoken critic of the process of faculty promotion to tenure. In 1999, Coico stated, "There needs to be some flexibility so you don't have arbitrary numbers determining somebody's career at an institution."

In July 2004, Coico left Cornell Medical College and GSMS to accept the position of dean of New York State College of Human Ecology, one of four the statutory colleges in the State University of New York system, funded and supervised by New York State, and located on the campus of Cornell University. Staiano-Coico succeeded New York State College of Human Ecology Dean Patsy Brannon, whose term ended June 30, 2004. However, Coico's term was once again relatively brief, and according to The Cornell Daily Sun, she "stepped down suddenly" after less than three years on the job, in March 2007. Coico took a position as the provost and chief academic officer of Temple University, joining Temple's then-vice president of Human Resources Deborah Hartnett, who later retired from Temple in order to become Coico's chief of staff at The City College of New York. While at Temple, Coico served on the board of managers of the University City Science Center, before leaving after a three-year stint to accept her appointment as president at The City College of New York in 2010.

=== The City College of New York presidency ===
In 2010, the City University of New York (CUNY) Board of Trustees ratified Coico to the position of 12th president of The City College of New York (CCNY), the oldest college in the system, amidst a stormy battle between CUNY and Italian Americans over affirmative action. According to The New York Times, CUNY pointed to the two Italian-American College presidents to refute the biased claim—Regina S. Peruggi at Kingsborough Community College, and Lisa Staiano-Coico at the university's flagship campus.

Coico was appointed president five years into CUNY Chancellor Matthew Goldstein's 2005–2015 Decade of Science, a system-wide initiative to expand facilities and recruit faculty in the STEM fields of science, technology, engineering, and mathematics, and eleven years into the university's reform efforts to raise academic standards based upon a 1998 Mayoral task force report, entitled "The City University of New York: An Institution Adrift."

==== Controversy ====
According to an article published in The Campus, a 2016 study conducted by Harvard Graduate School of Education found professors at City College of New York "extremely dissatisfied". Controversy and unrest persisted throughout Coico's time as president. Protests organized by Allen Roskoff, Scott Caplan, Charles Bayor, and other members of the Jim Owles Club erupted over the return of Reserve Officers' Training Corps (ROTC) to campus, employment, the sudden defunding of the CCNY's WHCR-FM, also known "The Voice of Harlem," cafeteria closure due to health violations, and labor contracts.

Coico's term as president saw high turnover among high level college administration, including five different individuals in CCNY's number-two position of provost in a six-year period. Students protested the president's actions on campus, and in Coico's hometown of Larchmont, New York. campus employment conditions and administrative closures of CCNY Student and Community Center in 2013, and CCNY Schiff House, alternately known as the Child Development And Family Services Center, in 2015. The annual 2016 April Fool's satirical issue of the student newspaper The Campus featured the article "Where's Lisa Coico?"

In 2016, The New York Times reported Coico was the subject of interest in federal and New York State investigations, following a report that the 21st Century Foundation—a nonprofit charity affiliated with The City College of New York—had paid some of Coico's personal expenses upon her arrival in 2010, and the charity was then reimbursed over $150,000 by the Research Foundation of CUNY, which manages research funds for the entire university system. The scandal prompted Federal prosecutors to look into affiliated of The City College of New York, and charity funds spending attached to CUNY and CCNY, which Coico and others may have misused. After news of Coico's possible misuse of funds came to light, top CCNY and CUNY administrators defended Coico, However, a group of CCNY senior faculty, according to The Observer, made a plea for further investigation to then-Chancellor James Milliken—himself a source of financial controversy after moving into an upper east side penthouse paid for by the public university system. CCNY senior faculty discovered money missing from the Martin and Toni Sosnoff Fund for the Arts—part of the holdings of the City College 21st Century Foundation—which should have contained roughly $600,000, had just $76.00. The outrage prompted Milliken-enlisted Fredrick Shaffer, then-City University of New York general counsel and senior vice chancellor for legal affairs, to audit Coico's spending. Although Shaffer ruled out financial malfeasance, the Times provided evidence suggesting that a 2011 memo detailing Coico's reimbursements had been fabricated.

==== Resignations ====
Coico resigned on October 7, 2016, effective immediately, shortly after The New York Times approached the university about a memo of Coico's expenses which suggested tampering and prompted an investigation. Records showed Coico, who earned an annual salary of $400,000, withdrew money from the non-profit 21st Century Foundation in 2010 and 2011. Although Coico denied any "inappropriate use" of CCNY funds and stated in letters to students and faculty that college employees should "cooperate fully" with investigators. However, a subsequent report from the office of the New York State Inspector General pointed out the illegality of CUNY General Cousel's action to not report Coico's misconduct to the Inspector General.

After Coico's departure, City University of New York board chairman Thompson stated in a letter to the New York State Inspector General that Coico had been directed by a "lawyer for the university" to reimburse funds she misused from the City College 21st Century Foundation, although the college subsequently "discovered that in fact she did not return all the funds, despite her representations to the contrary." Board chair Thompson asked for a state review of every CUNY-affiliated foundation, citing concerns about the lack of oversight over spending. At Thompson's behest, an investigation spearheaded by New York State Inspector General Catherine Leahy Scott issued a report (which the I.G.'s office called an "interim review") in November 2016, citing "shoddy oversight and ineffective management" at the City University of New York had created a system "ripe for abuse" that had possibly siphoned away money from needy students and crucial campus projects.

Following the release of the I.G.'s report, Governor Andrew Cuomo vowed to appoint an Inspector General to both the City University of New York and the State University of New York and called for new leadership at both institutions. Earlier, Governor Cuomo had replaced most of CUNY's trustees, including chairman Benno C. Schmidt Jr., naming a new chairman, Bill Thompson, former New York City Comptroller; Fernando Ferrer, former Bronx Borough President; Robert F. Mujica, the governor's budget director and a longtime top aide for the Senate Republican majority; Ken Sunshine, a public relations consultant; and Mayra Linares-Garcia, Cuomo's former director of Latino affairs and the daughter of Guillermo Linares, former NYC assemblyman and city councilman, and head of the state Higher Education Services Corporation. In a letter addressed to James Milliken, on November 18, 2016, written by Elkan Abramovitz, Coico's lawyer, which was published in The New York Times, Coico accused CUNY administrators of making her the scapegoat for the university's poor fiscal practices.

In February 2017, CUNY Board of Trustees approved setting aside $25,000, in accordance with university practices, for each college president, or department dean, who might need to hire an attorney when being interviewed by I.G. Leahy Scott's investigators.

Following Coico's departure, the City College of New York and the City University of New York top officials left in the wake of investigations targeting university-wide financial practices. After Coico, Maurizio Trevisan resigned from the position as Provost of City College of New York, after occupying the number-two position under Coico. Since, other resignations included Allan H. Dobrin, from the position of Executive Vice Chancellor and Chief Operating Officer; Gillian Small, former CUNY Vice Chancellor for Research; and Frederick P. Schaffer, who retired from the position of CUNY Vice Chancellor for Legal Affairs and General Counsel. Jay Hershenson, who was demoted from Senior Vice Chancellor of University Relations to a vice-president at Queens College, was criticized for his spending practices while the university is in financial trouble. At the close of 2017, CUNY Chancellor James B. Milliken announced he was stepping down, after only three-years on the job.

In 2018, two years after Coico resigned amidst ongoing federal and state probes, the inspector general continued to identify and investigate the university's corrupt spending practices.

==== Return ====
Coico returned in 2018 to the City University of New York system as a faculty member as medical professor in the CUNY School of Medicine in the Department of Molecular, Cellular, and Biomedical Science.

=== Corporate affiliations ===
In 1996, Coico established an employment relationship with Ortec International Incorporated, a New York City biotechnology company, later renamed Forticell Bioscience, Incorporated. Coico assisted in the development of the company's composite cultured skin product, along with Cocio's Cornell colleague, Suzanne Schwartz, hired full-time in July 1996. The founder, Steven Katz, was elected board chair in 1994; Katz had been a professor of Economics and Finance at Baruch College/CUNY from 1972. Coico joined the company advisory board in 1999.

Forticell Bioscience, Incorporated is a publicly traded company that developed proprietary and patented technology to stimulate the repair and regeneration of human tissue, including biologically active wound dressings, such as the tissue engineered product OrCel (trademark sign), to stimulate the repair and regeneration of human skin on burn patients, and other wound healing products, relevant to reconstructive and cosmetic surgeries. Forticell Bioscience, Incorporated is also an FDA- and New York State-approved tissue bank.

Coico is an officer of several for-profit corporations, including Coico Software Solutions, LLC (established 2000), Staiano Consulting, (2003); Coico Real Property Holding Company, Incorporated (established 2004); Coico Medical L.L.C., Sacramento, California, and LSC Collaborative, Limited Liability Corporation (established 2014).

== Selected publications ==
- Hanif, R; Pittas, A; Feng, Y; Koutsos, MI; Qiao, L; Staiano-Coico, L; Shiff, SI; Rigas, B (July 26, 1996). "Effects of nonsteroidal anti-inflammatory drugs on proliferation and on induction of apoptosis in colon cancer cells by a prostaglandin-independent pathway". Biochemical Pharmacology. 52 (2): 237–45. doi:10.1016/0006-2952(96)00181-5. PMID 8694848.
- Wysocki, AB; Staiano-Coico, L; Grinnell, F (July 1993). "Wound fluid from chronic leg ulcers contains elevated levels of metalloproteinases MMP-2 and MMP-9". The Journal of Investigative Dermatology. 101 (1): 64–8. doi:10.1111/1523-1747.ep12359590. PMID 8392530.
- Darzynkiewicz, Z; Sharpless, T; Staiano-Coico, L; Melamed, MR (November 1980). "Subcompartments of the G1 phase of cell cycle detected by flow cytometry". Proceedings of the National Academy of Sciences of the United States of America. 77 (11): 6696–9. Bibcode:1980PNAS...77.6696D. doi:10.1073/pnas.77.11.6696. PMC 350355. PMID 6161370.
- Darzynkiewicz, Z; Traganos, F; Kapuscinski, J; Staiano-Coico, L; Melamed, MR (July 1984). "Accessibility of DNA in situ to various fluorochromes: relationship to chromatin changes during erythroid differentiation of Friend leukemia cells". Cytometry. 5 (4): 355–63. doi:10.1002/cyto.990050411. PMID 6468176.
- Darzynkiewicz, Z; Traganos, F; Staiano-Coico, L; Kapuscinski, J; Melamed, MR (March 1982). "Interaction of rhodamine 123 with living cells studied by flow cytometry". Cancer Research. 42 (3): 799–806. PMID 7059978.

Academic offices
Preceded by Patsy M. Branon	Dean of Human Ecology; 2004–2007	Succeeded by Alan Mathios
Preceded by Richard M. Englert	Provost of Temple University; 2007–2010	Succeeded by Richard M. Englert
Preceded by Gregory H. Williams	President of City College of New York; 2010 – 2016	Succeeded by Vincent Boudreau
