= Vincent Boudreau =

President of the City College of New York

Vincent Gordon Boudreau

13th President of the City College of New York
- Incumbent
- Assumed office: November 2, 2016 (interim president); December 4, 2017 (president)
- Preceded by: Lisa Staiano-Coico

Personal details
- Born: 1962 (age 63–64)
- Education: Le Moyne College (BA); Cornell University (PhD)
- Scientific career
- Fields: Political science
- Thesis: At the margins of the movement: Grassroots associations in the Philippine socialist network (1993)

Vincent Gordon Boudreau is a political scientist who has been the 13th president of the City College of the City University of New York since December 2017.

Prior to his appointment as president, in 2016, he was appointed interim president following the resignation of Lisa Staiano-Coico. At the time, he was the dean of City College’s Colin Powell School for Civic and Global Leadership.

== Education ==
Boudreau graduated from Le Moyne College in DeWitt, New York, in 1984 with a Bachelor of Arts with a major in political science. Boudreau received a Doctor of Philosophy in political science from Cornell University in 1993. While at Cornell, Boudreau was arrested five times for participating in anti-apartheid protests which included sit-ins and an encampment that lasted 65 days.

== Career ==
Vincent Boudreau was a professor of political science, the director of the International Relations Department, the chair of the Political Science Department and the deputy dean of the Social Science Division at the City College of New York. Boudreau was also director of the Colin L. Powell Center for Leadership and Service from 2002 to 2013, prior to being dean of the Colin Powell School for Civic and Global Leadership. During this period, he published Resisting Dictatorship: Repression and Protest in Southeast Asia, a work that focused on how protest is influenced and produced by repressive forces, specifically in Myanmar, Indonesia, and the Philippines. Around the time of publication in the mid-2000s, Boudreau was described as a specialist on the Philippines.

In 2016, Boudreau was appointed interim president of City College of New York by the City University's board of trustees. In 2017, he became president of the City College of New York.

During the 2024 pro-Palestinian protests, Boudreau was criticized for employing the City of New York Police Department to break up an encampment in City College of New York campus. Amidst layoffs and an expected $100 million in budget cuts, the City University of New York approved $4 million to hire 100 additional police officers.
