= Frederick B. Robinson =

President of the City College of New York from 1927 to 1939

Frederick Bertrand Robinson

5th President of City College of New York
- In office 26 March 1927 – 30 June 1939
- Preceded by: Sidney Edward Mezes
- Succeeded by: Harry N. Wright

Personal details
- Born: 16 October 1883
- Died: 20 October 1941 (aged 58)

Frederick Bertrand Robinson (October 16, 1883 – October 20, 1941) served as the fifth president of the City College of New York between 1927 and 1939.

== Biography ==
He graduated from City College of New York in 1904 and was the first alumnus to serve as president of the college. He received his doctorate from New York University.

During his tenure, Robinson attempted to stifle the widespread leftist activism on campus by firing and suspending faculty and students who espoused Marxist viewpoints. In total, Robinson succeeded in having 43 CCNY students expelled, 38 suspended, and hundreds of undergraduates summoned before campus disciplinary boards between 1931 and 1934. On October 9, 1934, Robinson invited an official delegation of students representing Mussolini's fascist regime in Italy to be honored at a special assembly. As a result of student protests in opposition to the invitation, Robinson had 21 student leaders expelled and temporarily dissolved the Student Council.

As an opponent of such movements, Robinson was the subject of frequent protests by students and faculty, leading to his resignation in June 1939. Robinson graduated from CCNY in 1904 and was the first CCNY alumnus to serve as its president.

He died on October 20, 1941.
