= Rosenberg/Humphrey Program in Public Policy =

The Rosenberg/Humphrey Program in Public Policy (also known as the Marvin Rosenberg/Hubert H. Humphrey Program in Public Policy) is a fellowship program out of the City College of New York. The fellowship offers admitted students a stipend to complete summer internships of their choosing, either in Washington D.C. or New York City. The fellowships are intended to be policy centered.

== Origin ==
The fellowship was established in 1984 by Marvin Rosenberg, a friend of U.S. senator Hubert H. Humphrey.

== Past internship placements ==
Interns have held positions in various local, state, and national organizations, both governmental and non-for-profit. Below is a list of past organizations that RH fellows have worked for:

- Africa Policy Information Center
- American Civil Liberties Union
- Americans for Democratic Action
- Brookings Institution
- Center for Community Change
- City of New York, Department of Business Services
- Common Cause
- Congressional Offices including Hillary Clinton, Charles Rangel, and Major Owens
- Constituency for Africa
- Council on Hemispheric Affairs
- Department of Health and Human Services
- Department of Transportation
- Earth Day Network
- House Committee on Small Business
- General Accounting Office
- Institute for Policy Studies
- Justice Department
- Lambda Legal Defense and Education Fund
- Leadership Conference on Civil Rights
- League of United Latin American Citizens
- Library of Congress
- Mexican American Legal Defense and Education Fund
- NASA
- National Asian Pacific-American Legal Consortium
- National Council of La Raza
- National Organization for Women
- National Urban League
- OMB Watch
- Physicians for Social Responsibility
- Public Defender Service
- Public Voice for Food and Health Policy
- US General Services Administration Office
- Equal Employment Opportunity
