= Buell G. Gallagher =

American educator (1904–1978)

The Reverend Doctor Buell Gordon Gallagher
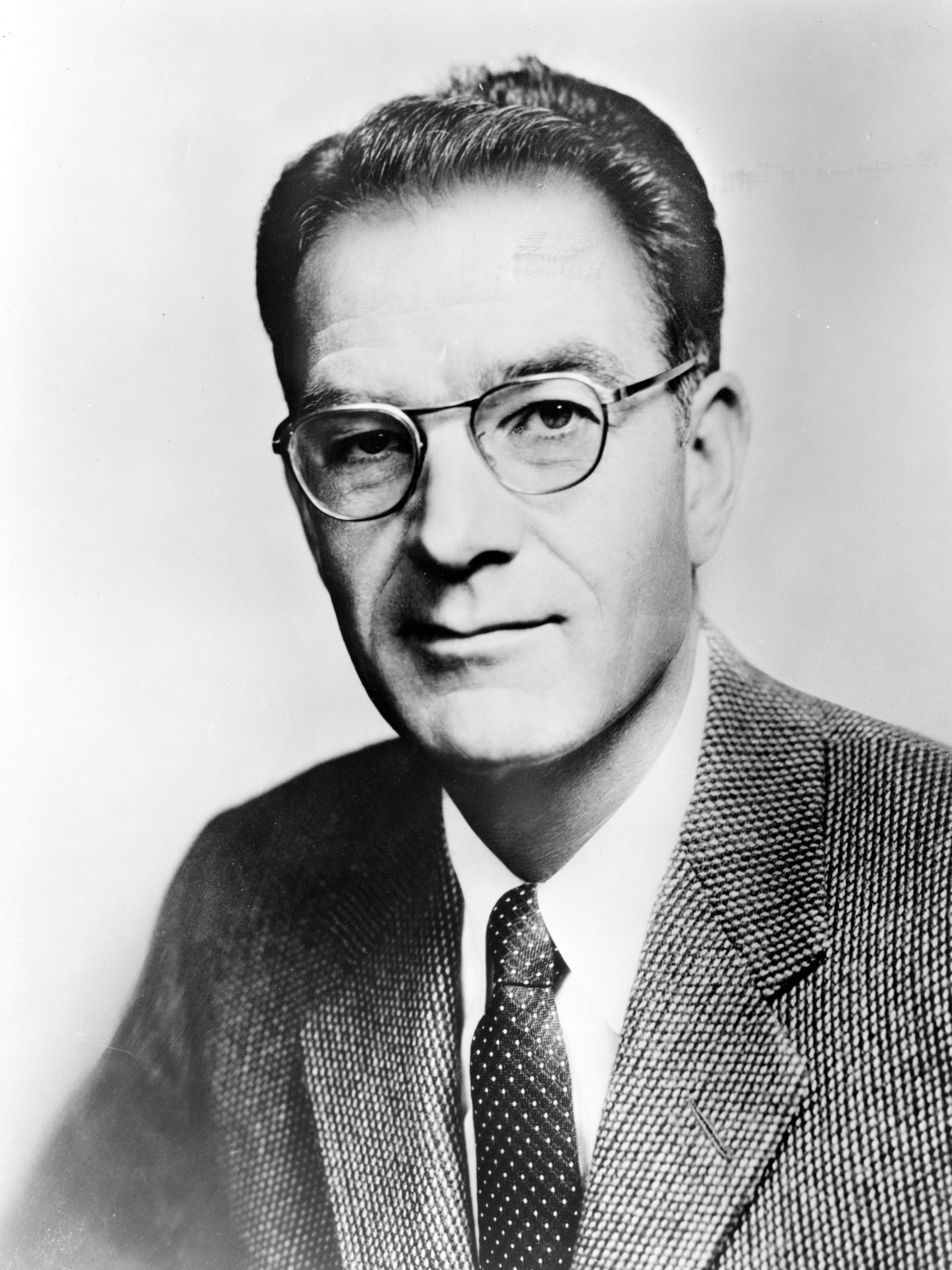

President of Talladega College
- In office 1933–1943

5th President of City College of New York
- In office 1953–1969
- Preceded by: Harry N. Wright
- Succeeded by: Robert Marshak

Personal details
- Born: February 4, 1904 Rankin, Illinois
- Died: August 30, 1978 (aged 74) Manhattan, New York
- Spouse: June Lucille Sampson (m. 1903–1980)
- Education: Carleton College (B.A, 1925); Union Theological Seminary (Theology, 1929)

Buell Gordon Gallagher (February 4, 1904 – August 30, 1978) served as president of Talladega College from 1933 to 1943 and as the seventh president of the City College of New York between 1953 and 1969. He was an ordained Congregational Minister and a pioneer in race relations.

== Early life and education ==
Gallagher was born in Rankin, Illinois to Elmer and Elma Maryel (Poole) Gallagher. He received his bachelor's degree at Carleton College in 1925, and divinity degree at Union Theological Seminary in 1929, followed by a year of studies at the London School of Economics.

== Career ==
Gallagher wrote to W. E. B. DuBois in 1931 seeking advice on jobs where he could do "interracial work following graduation from theological seminary." DuBois responded "a man with a church in a small town, who could bring into that church white and black, natives and foreigners, employers and employees, would in the end be doing an inter-racial job far beyond any organization. I regret to say, however, with the present attitude of white Christians, I do not anticipate that the young man would find such a job easy."

In 1933, at the age of 29 he was appointed president of Talladega College, and authored research papers on the subject of civil rights and race relations in higher education. At the time, he was believed to be the youngest college president in the country. He was appointed to the job with the condition that he would pursue a doctorate during his tenure. He enrolled at Columbia University and wrote a thesis under the supervision of William H. Kilpatrick on the role of historically black colleges in undermining racial segregation. His dissertation was revised and published as American Caste and the Negro College in 1938. In 1944, he was hired as an instructor of Christian ethics at the Pacific School of Religion, and briefly served as an Assistant Commissioner of Education under President Harry S. Truman.

Gallagher's 1946 book Color and Conscience was among the most critically antiracist books written by any white person in the 1940s. It interrogated Jim Crow and other forms of racism in light of the history of slavery and growing anti-colonial movements. In the book he wrote that “Our racial caste system has its historical roots in slavery, but thrusts its contemporary tentacles into every crevice and cranny of the social structure throughout the nation. Slavery as ownership of chattel is gone: as a caste system, it remains.”. In this book he went so far as to criticize the ban on interracial marriage, something that was downplayed by antiracist activists in the era.

Gallagher co-founded the South Berkeley Community Church, the first explicitly interracial church in the Bay Area, which attracted a membership of several hundred at its peak. He was an unpaid co-pastor at the church for much of the late 1940s.

In 1948, Gallagher ran for Congress as a Democrat in the 7th Congressional District, which included Oakland and Berkeley. He did so with the endorsement of Independent Progressive Party candidate and former Vice President Henry Wallace. He ran on a pro-union, anti-segregation, and pro-United Nations platform. He lost to his opponent by one percent.

He was hired as President of the City College of New York in 1952. He left the position in 1961 to become the founding chancellor of the California State University system, but after red-baiting attacks, he returned to CCNY after only nine months. Gallagher resigned at CUNY in 1969, following the "open enrollment" crisis that year.

He was a member of the anti-Castro organization, Citizens Committee for a Free Cuba.

== Published works ==
American Caste and the Negro College (1938)

Color and Conscience (1946)

Academic offices
New office	Chancellor of the California State University; 1961–1962	Succeeded by Glenn Dumke
