= Harry N. Wright =

President of City College of New York (1881–1969)

Harry Noble Wright

4th President of Whittier College
- In office 1917–1924
- Preceded by: Absalom Rosenberger
- Succeeded by: Walter F. Dexter

6th President of City College of New York
- In office 1941–1952
- Preceded by: Frederick B. Robinson
- Succeeded by: Buell G. Gallagher

Personal details
- Born: July 26, 1954 (age 72) Spokane, Washington, U.S.
- Spouse: Edna Alice (née White) Wright
- Education: Earlham College (BS); University of California, Berkeley (MS, PhD)

Harry Noble Wright (1881-1969) served as the sixth president of the City College of New York between 1941 and 1953. Wright received his degree in mathematics at Earlham College in 1904, continuing on to receive both his master's degree (Class of 1911) and PhD (Class of 1913) at the University of California, Berkeley. He served as dean and president of Whittier College between 1917 and 1924, later returning to Earlham as an instructor and dean. Wright was awarded an honorary Doctor of Laws (LL.D.) degree from Whittier College in 1947. In 1931, he was hired by CCNY as an instructor in 1931 and became the director of summer and evening sessions in 1939.
