= The Campus (CCNY) =

Student newspaper of the City College of New York

The Campus is the student newspaper of the City College of New York (CCNY).

== History ==
The newspaper was established as a weekly newspaper when the City College of New York (CCNY), a public university in the City University of New York system, opened its St. Nicholas Heights campus in Harlem.

Students who began their career at The Campus and later became notable journalists include A. H. Raskin, Fred M. Hechinger, A. M. Rosenthal, and Michael Oreskes, all of whom wrote for the New York Times. Melvin J. Lasky also wrote for The Campus as a student.
