= City College of New York =

Public college in New York City, New York, US

The City College of the City University of New York
- Other names: City College of New York; City College
- Former names: Free Academy of the City of New York (1847–1866); College of the City of New York (1866–1929); City College of New York (1929–1961)
- Motto: Respice, Adspice, Prospice (Latin)
- Motto in English: "Look behind, look here, look ahead"
- Type: Public research university
- Established: 1847; 179 years ago
- Founder: Townsend Harris
- Parent institution: City University of New York
- Accreditation: MSCHE
- Academic affiliations: GCU; ORAU; space-grant
- Endowment: $290 million (2019)
- President: Vincent Boudreau
- Provost: Tony Liss
- Faculty: 581 (full-time); 914 (part-time)
- Administrative staff: 401
- Students: 15,164 (fall 2024)
- Undergraduates: 13,113
- Postgraduates: 3,048
- Location: New York City, United States; 40.8194°N 73.9500°W
- Campus: 35 acres (0.14 km^{2}); Large city
- Newspaper: The Campus; The Paper
- Colors: Lavender/purple, gray, and white
- Nickname: Beavers
- Sporting affiliations: NCAA Division III – CUNYAC
- Mascot: Benny the Beaver
- Website: ccny.cuny.edu

The City College of the City University of New York (also known as The City College of New York, or simply City College or CCNY) is a public research university within the City University of New York (CUNY) system in New York City. Founded in 1847, City College was the first free public institution of higher education in the United States, although in modern times it charges tuition. It is the oldest of CUNY's 26 institutions of higher learning and is considered its flagship institution.

The main campus is located in the Hamilton Heights neighborhood of Manhattan. City College's 35-acre (14 ha) campus spans Convent Avenue from 130th to 141st Streets. It was built by architects George B. Post and William Stone Post. City College's satellite campus, City College Downtown, in the Cunard Building has been active since 1981, offering degree programs for working adults.

Among the precedents set by City College that helped shape the culture of American higher education are the following: what has been said by the college to be the first student government in the nation in 1867; the first national fraternity to accept members without any regard to religion, race, color or creed (Delta Sigma Phi, 1899); the first degree-granting evening program (School of Education, 1907); and, with the objective of racially integrating the college dormitories, "the first general strike at a municipal institution of higher learning" led by students (1949). The college has a 48% graduation rate within six years. It is categorized among "R2: Doctoral Universities – High research activity".

== History ==
=== Early 19th century ===
The City College of New York was established as the Free Academy of the City of New York in 1847 by Townsend Harris, a wealthy businessman and president of the Board of Education. A combination prep school, high school / secondary school and college, it would provide children of immigrants and the poor access to free higher education based on academic merit alone. It was one of the early public high schools in the United States.

The Free Academy was the first of what would become a system of municipally supported colleges – the second, Hunter College, was founded as a women's institution in 1870; and the third, Brooklyn College, was established as a coeducational institution in 1930. In 1847, New York State Governor John Young had given permission to the state Board of Education to found the Free Academy, which was ratified in a statewide referendum. Founder Townsend Harris proclaimed, "Open the doors to all… Let the children of the rich and the poor take their seats together and know of no distinction save that of industry, good conduct and intellect."

Horace Webster (1794–1871), a graduate of the United States Military Academy at West Point, was the first president of the Free Academy. At the Free Academy's formal opening on January 21, 1849, Webster said:

The experiment is to be tried, whether the children of the people, the children of the whole people, can be educated; and whether an institution of the highest grade, can be successfully controlled by the popular will, not by the privileged few.

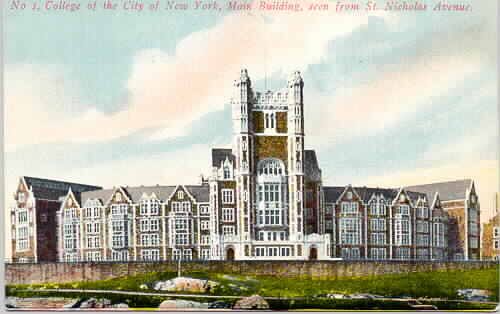
Original St. Nicholas Terrace entrance to Shepard Hall, the main building of CCNY, in the early 1900s, on its new campus in Hamilton Heights, looking up and westward from St. Nicholas Avenue

In 1847, a curriculum was adopted that had nine main fields: mathematics, history, language, literature, drawing, natural philosophy, experimental philosophy, law, and political economy. The academy's first graduation took place in 1853 in Niblo's Garden Theatre.

Even in its early years, the Free Academy had a framework of tolerance that extended beyond the admission of students from every social stratum. In 1854, Columbia University denied distinguished chemist and scientist Oliver Wolcott Gibbs a faculty position because of his Unitarian religious beliefs. Gibbs had been a professor at the Free Academy since 1848. He later went on to an appointment at Harvard College.

In 1849 the prep school Townsend Harris Hall Prep School opened on campus, launched as a one-year preparatory school for CCNY. In the early 1900s, as more Jewish students were enrolling, President John H. Finley liberalized students' obligations by rescinding mandatory chapel attendance.

=== Late 19th century ===
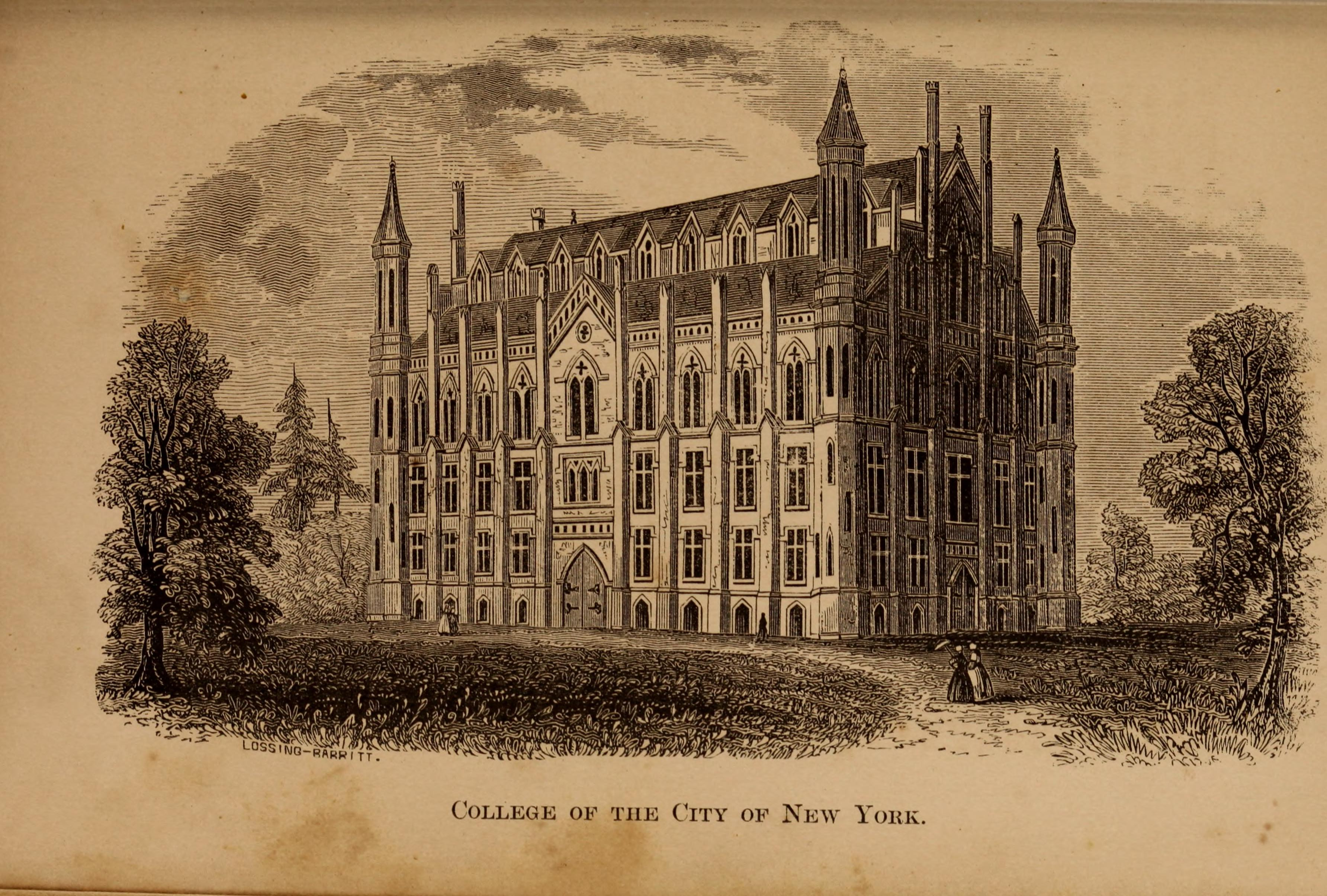
View in 1876

In 1866, the Free Academy, a men's institution, was renamed the College of the City of New York. In 1929, the College of the City of New York became the City College of New York. Finally, the institution became known as the City College of the City University of New York when the CUNY name was formally established as the umbrella institution for New York City's municipal-college system in 1961. The names City College of New York and City College, however, remain in general use.

With the name change in 1866, lavender was chosen as the college's color. In 1867, the short-lived academic senate was formed. Rudy (1949) identified this as seeming to be "the first experiment with student self-government attempted in an American college", although other scholars have identified earlier examples such as student literary societies. Having struggled over the issue for ten years, in 1895, the New York State Legislature voted to let the City College build a new campus. A four-square block site was chosen, located at West Harlem's Manhattanville, within the area which was enclosed by the North Campus Arches; the college, however, quickly expanded north of the Arches.

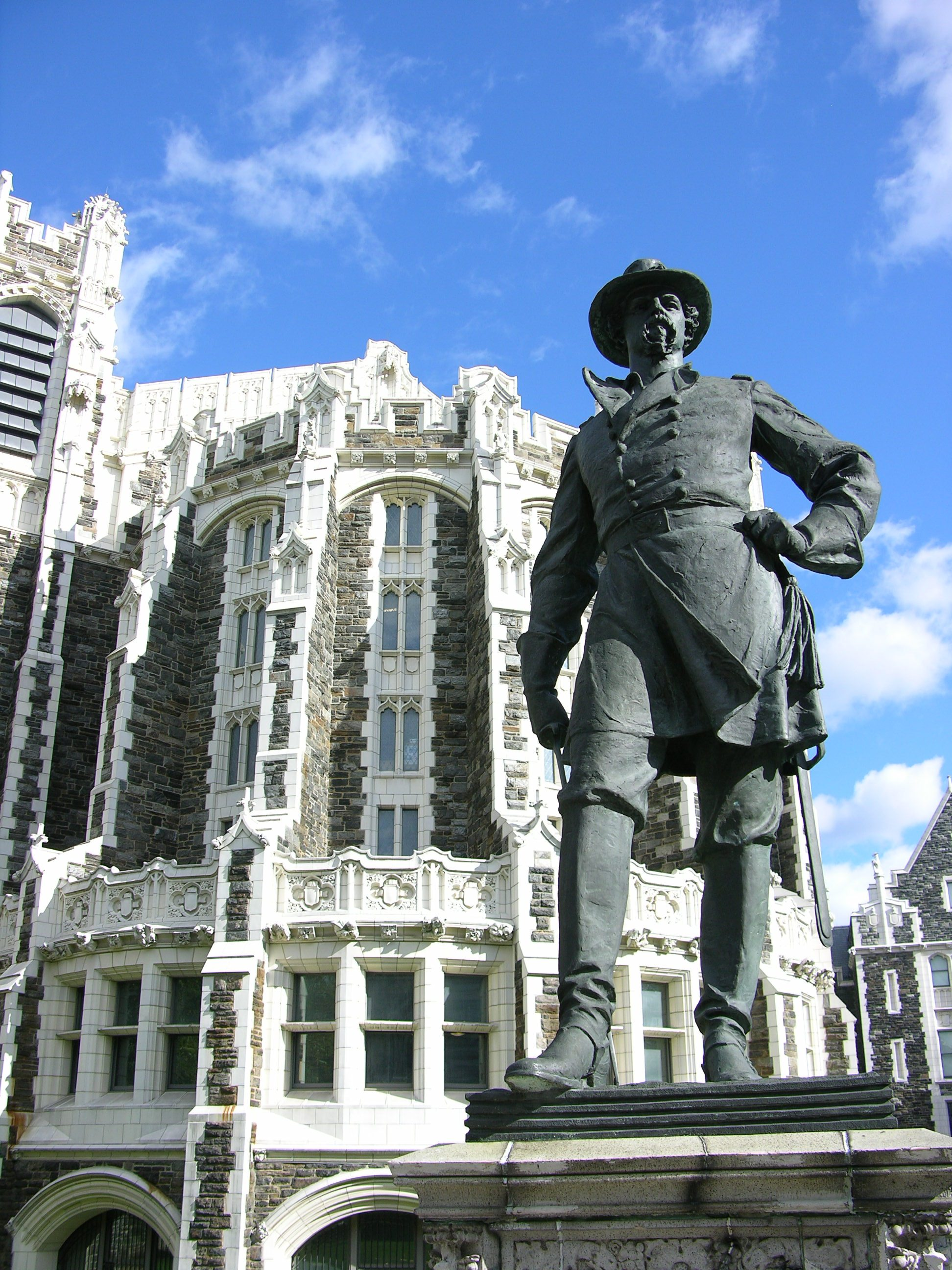
Statue of General Alexander S. Webb (1835–1911), second president of CCNY (1869–1903)

Like President Webster, the second president of the newly renamed City College was a West Point graduate. The second president, General Alexander S. Webb (1835–1911), assumed office in 1869, serving for almost the next three decades. One of the Union Army's heroes at Gettysburg, General Webb was the commander of the Philadelphia Brigade. In 1891, while still president of the City College, he was awarded the Congressional Medal of Honor for heroism at Gettysburg. A life-size statue of Webb, in full military uniform, stands in his honor at the heart of the campus.

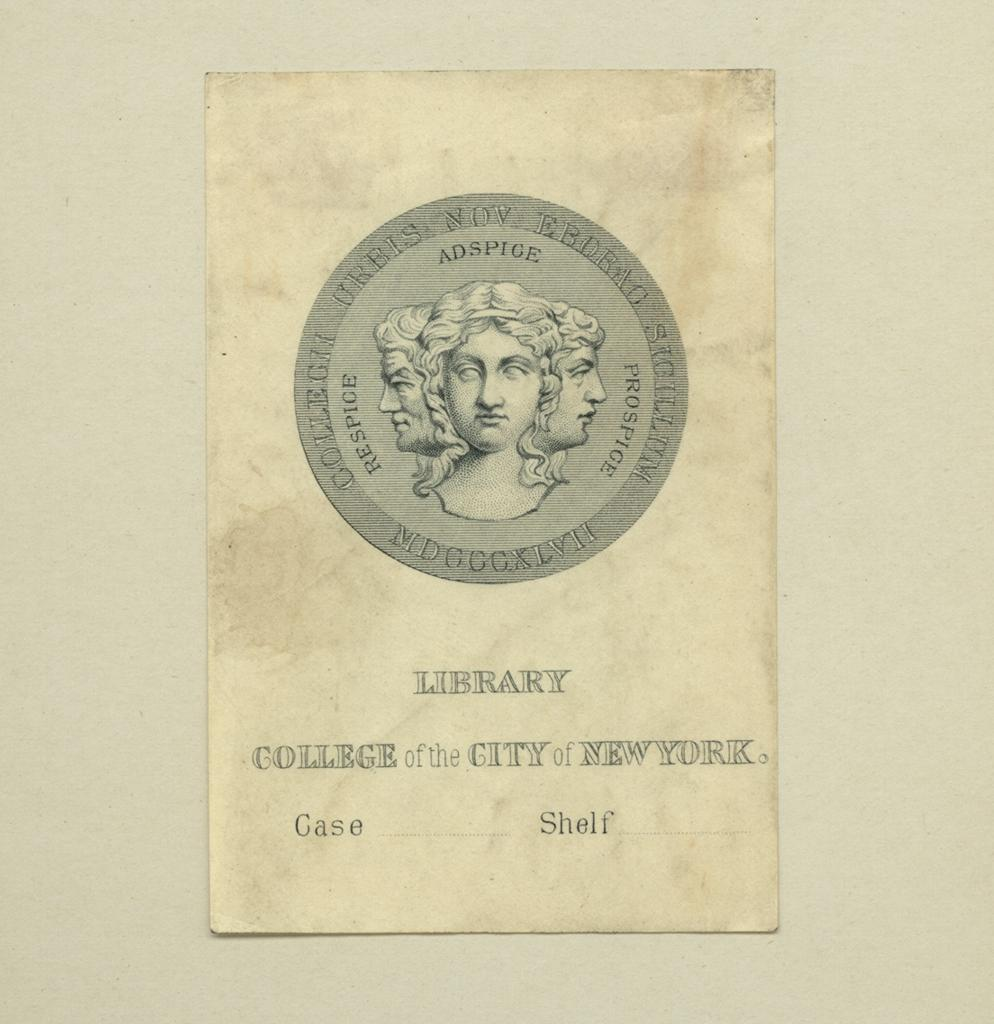
College library bookplate with an early version of the college seal from the era when the institution was named the College of the City of New York, 1866–1929

The college's curriculum under Webster and Webb combined classical training in Latin and Greek with more practical subjects like chemistry, physics, and engineering. General Webb was succeeded by John Huston Finley (1863–1940), as third president in 1903. Finley relaxed some of the West Point-like discipline that characterized the college, including compulsory religious chapel attendance.

Phi Sigma Kappa placed its then-sixth chapter on the campus in 1896; alumni provided scholarships to new students entering the CCNY system for generations. Delta Sigma Phi, founded at CCNY in 1899, claimed to be the first national organization of its type to accept members without regard to religion, race, color or creed. Previously, fraternities at CCNY had excluded Jews. The chapter flourished at the college until 1932 when it closed as a result of the Great Depression. The founding of Zeta Beta Tau at City College in 1898 was Richard Gottheil's initiative to establish a Jewish fraternity with Zionist ideals. It is now defunct at CUNY.

=== Early 20th century ===
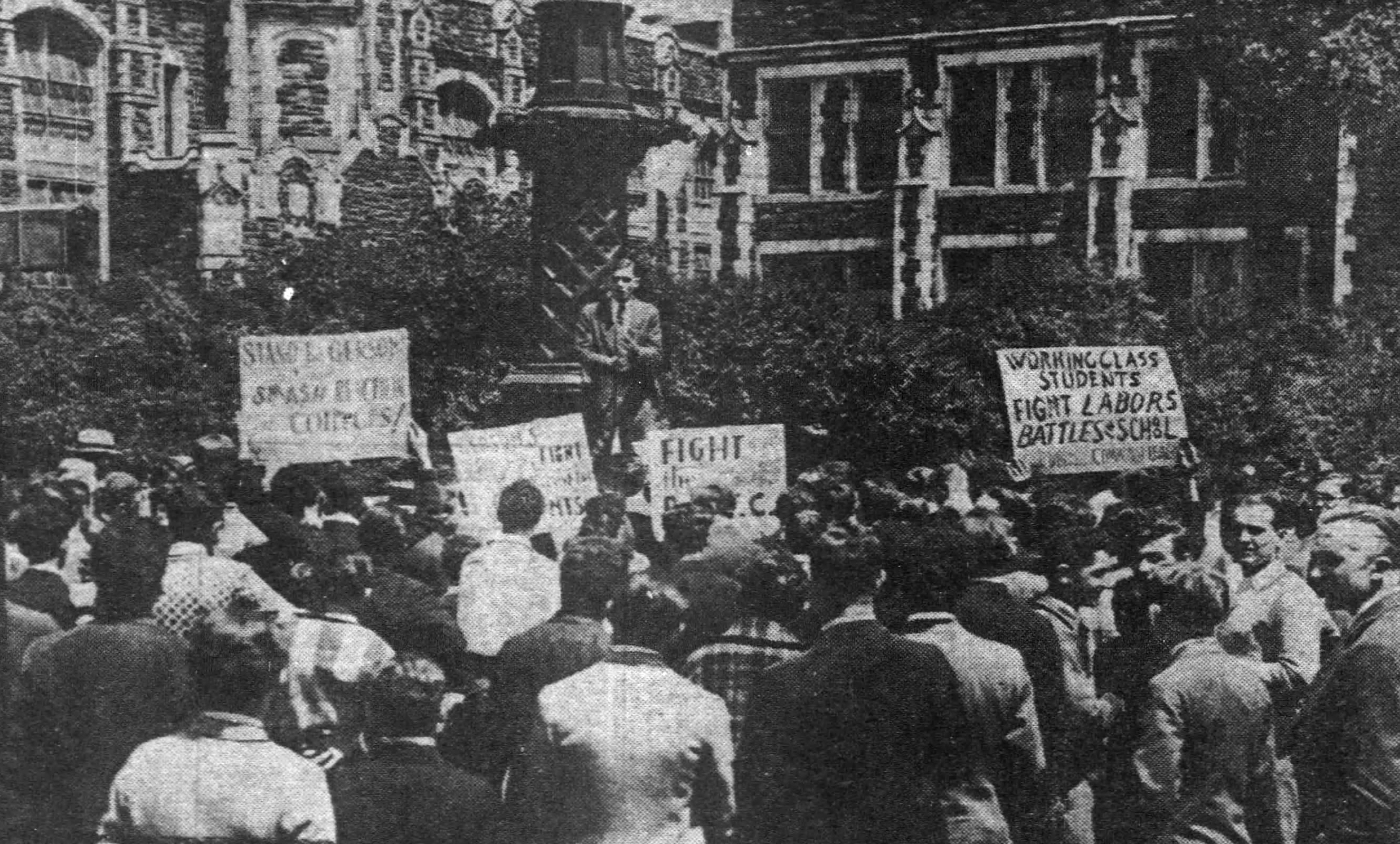
Simon Gerson, a student expelled for opposing military training at the school, addresses a demonstration under the campus flagpole, June 15, 1928

Education courses were first offered in 1897 in response to a city law that prohibited the hiring of teachers who lacked a proper academic background. The School of Education was established in 1921. The college newspaper, The Campus, published its first issue in 1907, and the first degree-granting evening session in the United States was started.

In the years when top-flight private schools were restricted to the children of the Protestant establishment, thousands of brilliant individuals (including Jewish students) attended City College because they had no other option. CCNY's academic excellence and status as a working-class school earned it the titles "Harvard of the Proletariat", the "poor man's Harvard", and "Harvard-on-the-Hudson." Irving Howe claims that when the philosopher Morris Raphael Cohen was a student at CCNY at the turn of the 20th century, the faculty was "not very glittering" and the school was considered "at once grubby and exalted."

Separate Schools of Business and Civic Administration and of Technology (Engineering) were established in 1919. In 1947, the college celebrated its centennial year, awarding honorary degrees to Bernard Baruch (class of 1889) and Robert F. Wagner (class of 1898). A 100-year time capsule was buried in North Campus.

Until 1929, City College had been an all-male institution. In 1930, CCNY admitted women for the first time, but only to graduate programs. In 1951, the entire institution became coeducational.

In its heyday of the 1930s through the 1950s, CCNY became known for its political radicalism. It was said that the old CCNY cafeteria in the basement of Shepard Hall, particularly in alcove 1 in Shepherd Hall, was the only place in the world where a fair debate between Trotskyists and Stalinists could take place. Being part of a political debate that began in the morning in alcove 1, Irving Howe reported that after some time had passed he would leave his place among the arguing students in order to attend class. When he returned to the cafeteria late in the day, he would find that the same debate had continued but with an entirely different cast of students.

The municipality of New York was considerably more conformist than CCNY students and faculty. The Philosophy Department, at the end of the 1939/40 academic year, invited the British mathematician and philosopher Bertrand Russell to become a professor at CCNY. Catholics protested Russell's appointment. A woman named Jean Kay filed suit against the state Board of Higher Education to block Russell's appointment, on the grounds that his views on marriage and sex would adversely affect her daughter's virtue, although her daughter was not a CCNY student. Russell wrote, "a typical American witch-hunt was instituted against me." Kay won the suit, and the board declined to appeal after considering the political pressure exerted.

Russell took revenge in the preface of the first edition of his book An Inquiry into Meaning and Truth, which was published by the Unwin Brothers in the United Kingdom (the preface was not included in the U.S. editions). In a long précis that detailed Russell's accomplishments including medals awarded by Columbia University and the Royal Society and faculty appointments at Oxford, Cambridge, UCLA, Harvard, the Sorbonne, Peking (the name used in that era), the LSE, Chicago, and so forth, Russell added, "Judicially pronounced unworthy to be Professor of Philosophy at the College of the City of New York."

With so many left-wing students attending CCNY in the 1930s, the college was sometimes labeled “the little Red schoolhouse.” Consistent with those times, City College alumni, students, and professors volunteered to fight for the Republican side during the Spanish Civil War, including thirteen, among them the 1939 class president Jack Freeman, who were killed in Spain.

After the United States entered World War II, the college mobilized. The New York Times reported that by January 1943, in excess of 80% of the student body was involved in some type of war-related service. The historian S. Willis Rudy wrote that “more than fifteen thousand City College men served in the armed forces of the nation. More than three thousand were commissioned officers. Over 380 received the Order of the Purple Heart for wounds sustained in defense of their country. Fully 850 were cited by the United States or the governments of its allies for meritorious service. Over 250 City College men laid down their lives on battlefields in every theatre of operations all over the world.”

=== Late 20th century ===
In 1945, the Knickerbocker Case was set off when William E. Knickerbocker, chairman of the romance languages department, was accused of antisemitism by four faculty members. They claimed that "for at least seven years they have been subjected to continual harassment and what looks very much like discrimination" by Knickerbocker. Four years later, Knickerbocker was again accused of antisemitism, this time for denying honors to high-achieving Jewish students. About the same time, William C. Davis of the economics department was accused by students of maintaining a racially segregated dormitory at Army Hall. Davis was the dormitory's administrator. CCNY students, many of whom were World War II veterans, launched a massive strike in 1949 in protest against Knickerbocker and Davis. The New York Times called the event "the first general strike at a municipal institution of higher learning."

By the 1960s, the Civil Rights Movement became a backdrop for activities at City College. Martin Luther King, Jr. delivered the commencement address at CCNY in 1963. CCNY undergraduate Stephen Somerstein documented in photographs the 1965 Selma-to-Montgomery march. As the student protest movement gathered force in the late 1960s with the Civil Rights Movement and anti-Vietnam War movement in full swing, anti-establishment feelings grew, culminating at CCNY during a 1969 protest takeover of the South campus, African American and Puerto Rican activists and their white allies demanded, among other policy changes, that the City College implement an aggressive affirmative action program to increase minority enrollment and provide academic support. At some point, campus protesters began referring to CCNY as "Harlem University." The administration of the City University at first balked at the demands, but instead, came up with an open admissions or open-access program under which any graduate of a New York City high school would be able to matriculate either at City College or another college in the CUNY system. Beginning in 1970, the program opened doors to college to many who would not otherwise have been able to attend college. The increased enrollment of students, regardless of college preparedness, however, affected City College's and the university's academic reputation and strained New York City's financial resources. A 2023 documentary film directed by Greta Schiller and Andrea Weiss, The Five Demands, provides historical coverage and interviews with students who led the 1969 protests.

City College began charging tuition in 1976. Open enrollment was eliminated in 2000 and academic entrance requirements were implemented at CUNY's senior colleges and applicants who could not meet it had to enroll in the system's community colleges, where they could prepare for an eventual transfer to one of the 4-year institutions. Since this decision, all CUNY senior colleges, especially CCNY, have seen an increase in incoming freshman GPA and SAT scores. The end of open admissions led to a change in CUNY's student demographics, with the number of Black and Hispanic students decreasing and the number of White Caucasian and Asian students increasing.

As a result of the 1989 student protests and building takeovers in response to tuition increases, a community action center was opened on the campus, called the Guillermo Morales/Assata Shakur Community and Student Center, located in the NAC building. The center was named after CUNY alumni Assata Shakur (Note: Shakur escaped the New Jersey Clinton Correctional Facility for Women while serving a life sentence for the 1973 murder of a New Jersey state trooper.) and Guillermo Morales, (Note: Morales, convicted in 1979 for possession of explosives and transporting them across state lines, escaped from the Bellevue Hospital prison ward.) both of whom self-exiled in Cuba. Students and neighborhood residents who used the center for community organizing against issues of racism, police brutality, and the privatization and militarization of CUNY faced opposition from the City College administration for years. After a long controversy, in October 2013, City College eventually shut down the Guillermo Morales/Assata Shakur Community and Student Center, citing a need for space to expand its career center; this closure provoked student demonstrations.

CCNY's new Frederick Douglass Debate Society defeated Harvard and Yale at the "Super Bowl" of the American Parliamentary Debate Association in 1996. In 2003, the institution's Model UN Team was awarded as an Outstanding Delegation at the National Model United Nations (NMUN) Conference, an honor that it would repeat four years in a row.

The U.S. Postal Service issued a postcard commemorating CCNY's 150th anniversary, featuring Shepard Hall, on Charter Day, May 7, 1997.

=== 21st century ===
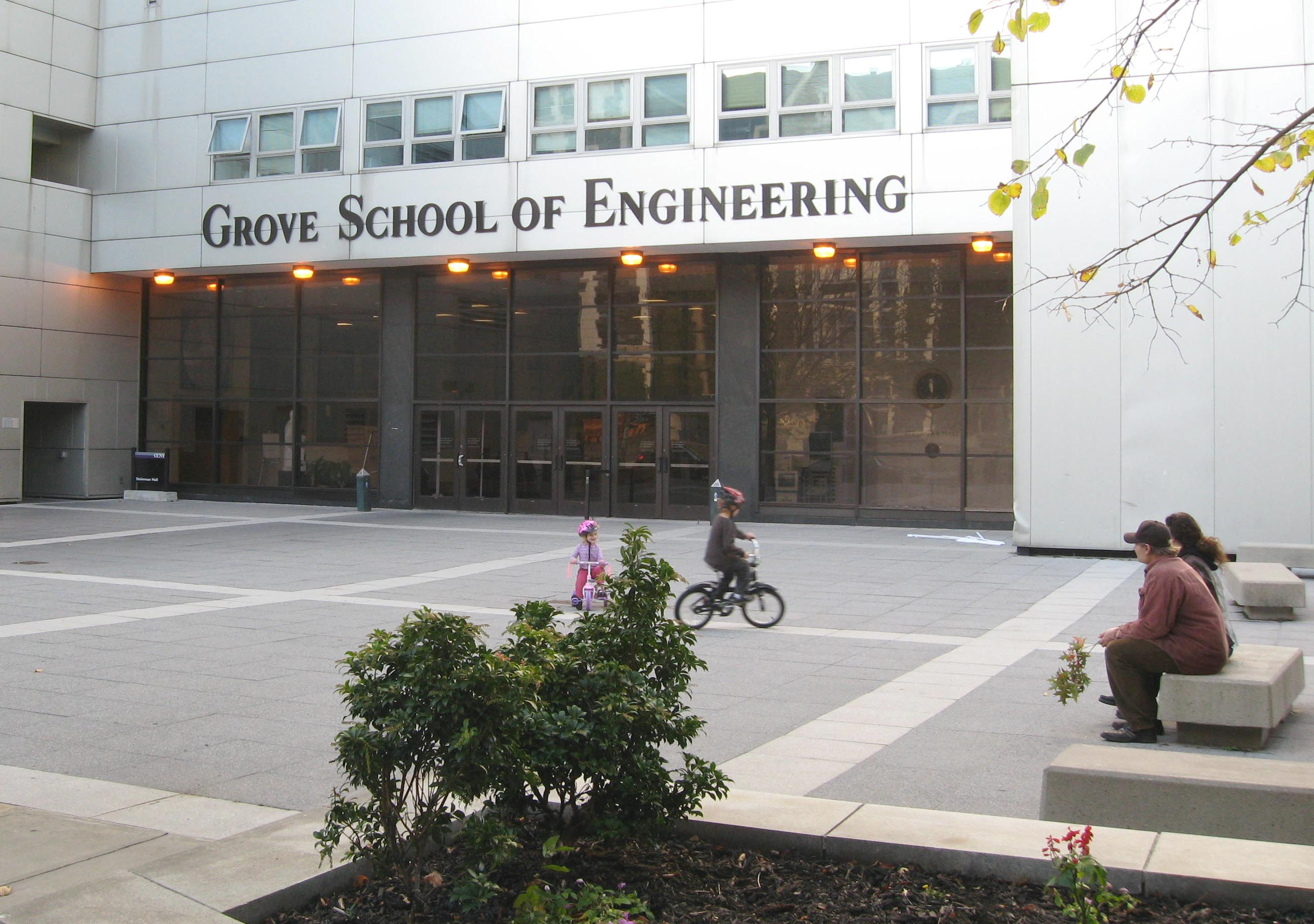
Engineering School

The City University of New York began recruiting students for the University Scholars program in the fall 2000, and admitted the first cohort of undergraduate scholars in the fall 2001. CCNY was one of five CUNY campuses, on which the program was initiated. The newly admitted students became undergraduates in the newly formed Macaulay Honors College. Students attending the Honors College receive free tuition.

In October 2005, Andrew Grove, a 1960 chemical engineering graduate and co-founder of Intel Corporation, donated $26 million to the Engineering School, which has since been renamed the Grove School of Engineering.

In August 2008, the authority to grant doctorates in engineering was transferred from the CUNY Graduate Center to City College Grove School of Engineering. The authority to grant doctorates in clinical psychology was also transferred from the CUNY Graduate Center to City College, but in 2016.

In 2009, the School of Architecture moved into the former Y Building, which was gutted and completely remodeled under the design direction of architect Rafael Viñoly. Also in 2009, the school was renamed the Bernard and Anne Spitzer School of Architecture in honor of the $25 million gift the Spitzers gave to the school.

In May 2023, CCNY officials announced that the institution will open an immigrant center to assist undocumented students.

As part of the 2024 pro-Palestinian protests on university campuses, a student- and faculty-built encampment was established in April 2024 on the City College campus. Less than a week after protests began at the encampment, on the night of April 30, 2024, the New York City Police Department was called on campus to dismantle the site, making 173 arrests.

=== Presidents ===
1. Horace Webster, 1847–1869
2. Alexander S. Webb, 1869–1902
3. John Huston Finley, 1903–1913
4. Sidney Edward Mezes, 1914–1927
5. Frederick B. Robinson, 1927–1938
  - Nelson P. Mead (acting), 1938–1941
6. Harry N. Wright, 1941–1952
7. Buell G. Gallagher, 1953–1961, 1962–1969
  - Harry N. Rivlin (acting), 1961–1962
  - Joseph J. Copeland (interim), 1969–1970
8. Robert Marshak, 1970–1979
  - Alice Chandler (interim), 1979–1980
  - Arthur Tiedemann (interim), 1980–1981
9. Bernard W. Harleston, 1981–1992
  - Augusta Souza Kappner (interim), 1992–1993
10. Yolanda T. Moses, 1993–1999
  - Stanford A. Roman Jr. (interim), 1999–2000
11. Gregory H. Williams, 2001–2009
  - Robert "Buzz" Paaswell (interim), 2009–2010
12. Lisa S. Coico, 2010–2016
  - Vincent G. Boudreau (interim), 2016–2017
13. Vincent G. Boudreau, 2017–present

== Campuses ==
=== North Campus ===
- College of the City of New York; North Campus
- U.S. National Register of Historic Places
- New York State Register of Historic Places
- New York City Landmark
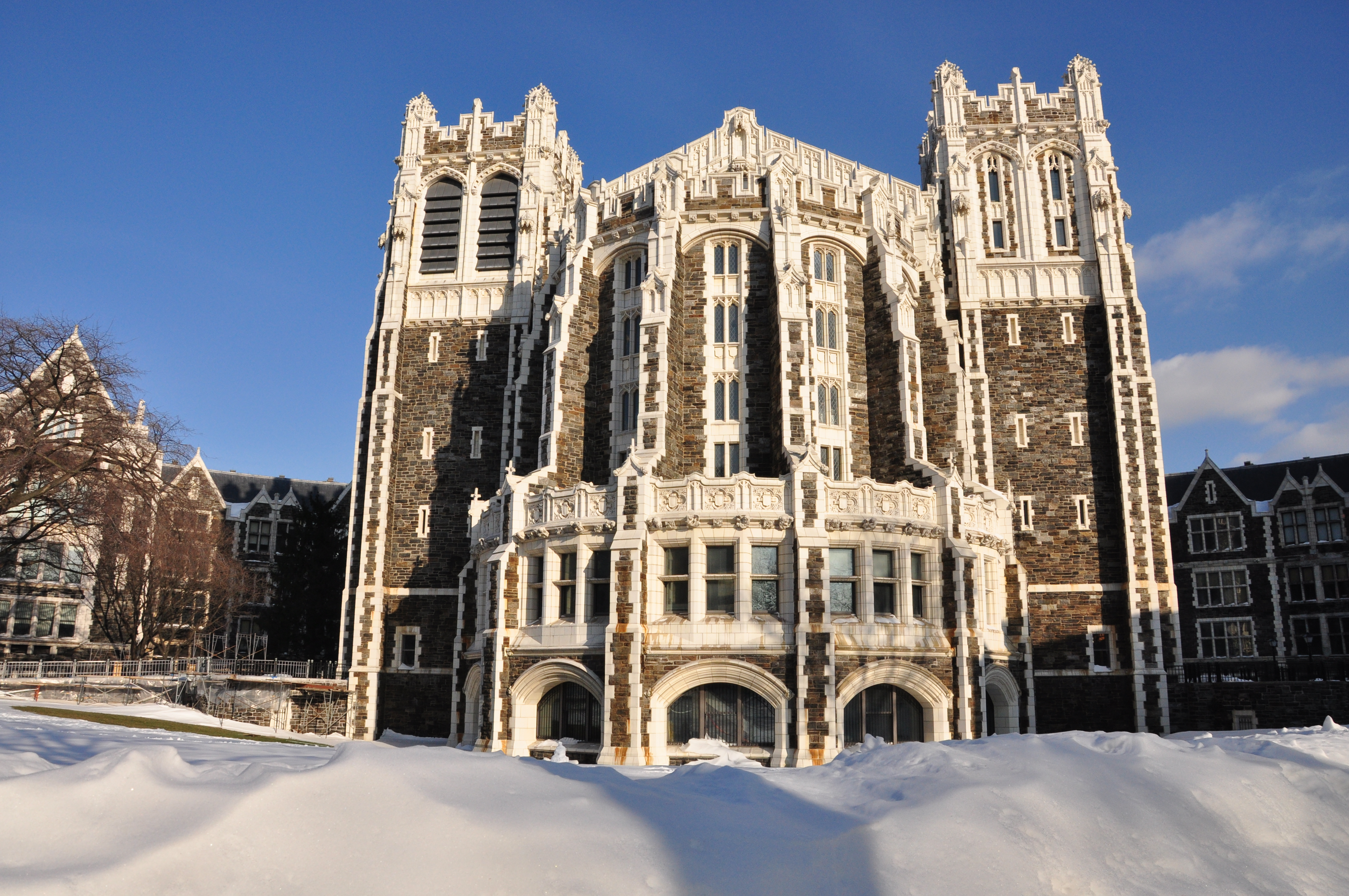
- Shepard Hall, rear entrance, looking east from Convent Avenue (2010)
- Location: Bounded by Amsterdam Ave., St. Nicholas Terr., W. 138th, and W. 140th Sts., New York, New York
- Coordinates: 40°49′15″N 73°56′58″W
- Area: 8 acres (3.2 ha)
- Built: 1898
- Architect: George B. Post & Sons
- Architectural style: Collegiate Gothic
- NRHP reference No.: 84002763
- NYCL No.: 1036

Significant dates
- Added to NRHP: September 7, 1984
- Designated NYSRHP: August 3, 1984
- Designated NYCL: May 26, 1981

CCNY's Collegiate Gothic campus in Manhattanville was erected in 1906, replacing a downtown campus built in 1849. This new campus was designed by George Browne Post. According to CCNY's published history, "The Landmark neo-Gothic buildings [...] are superb examples of English Perpendicular Gothic style and are among the first buildings, as an entire campus, to be built in the U.S. in this style. Groundbreaking for the Gothic Quadrangle buildings took place in 1903." There were five original neo-Gothic buildings on the upper Manhattan campus, which opened between 1906 and 1908: Shepard Hall, Baskerville Hall, Compton Hall, Harris Hall, and Wingate Hall.

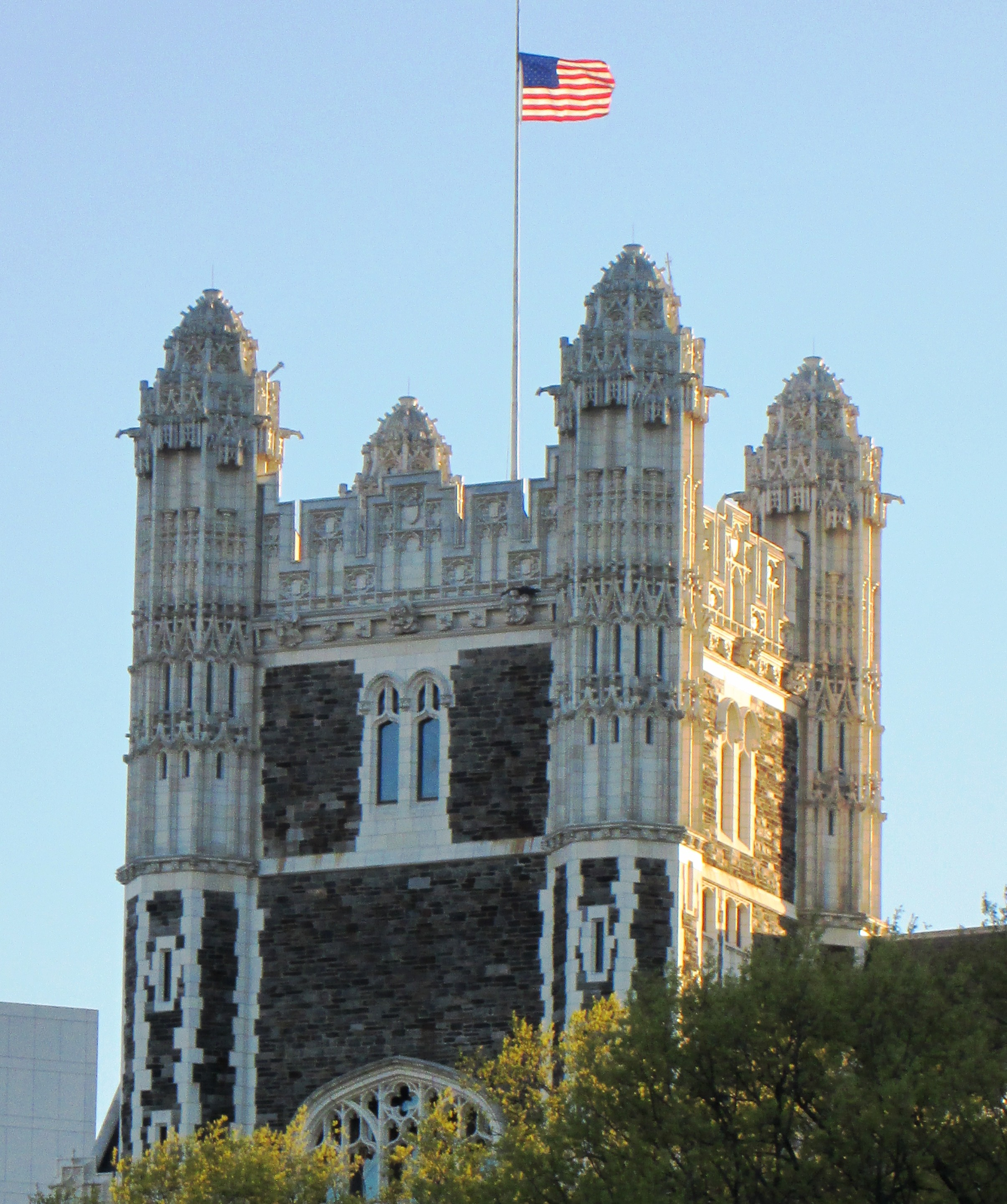
Shepard Hall tower, seen from Hamilton Heights

Shepard Hall, the largest building and the centerpiece of the campus, was modeled after a Gothic cathedral plan with its main entrance on St. Nicholas Terrace. It has a large chapel assembly hall called the Great Hall, which has a mural painted by Edwin Blashfield called "The Graduate" and another mural in the Lincoln Hallway called "The Great Teachers" painted by Abraham Bogdanove in 1930. The building was named after Edward M. Shepard. One of Ernest Skinner's earliest organs was installed in the Great Hall in the early 1900s.

Baskerville Hall for many years housed the Chemistry Department, was also known as the Chemical Building, and had one of the largest original lecture halls on the campus, Doremus lecture hall. It currently houses HSMSE, The High School for Mathematics, Science, and Engineering.

Compton Hall was originally designed as the Mechanical Arts Building.

Harris Hall, named in the original architectural plans as the Sub-Freshman Building, housed City College's preparatory high school, Townsend Harris High School, from 1906 until it moved in 1930 downtown to the School of Business.

Wingate Hall was named for George Wood Wingate (Class of 1858), an attorney and promoter of physical fitness. It served as the college's main gymnasium between 1907 and 1972.

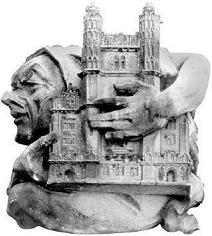
A stone grotesque on a CCNY building from 1906, holding a model of Shepard Hall

The sixth campus, Goethals Hall, was completed in 1930. The new building was named for George Washington Goethals, the CCNY civil engineering alumnus who, as mentioned above in the section on the history of the college, went on to become the chief engineer of the Panama Canal. Goethals Hall housed the School of Technology (engineering) and adjoins the Mechanical Arts Building, Compton Hall.

The six neo-Gothic buildings are connected by a tunnel, which closed to public use in 1969. Six hundred grotesques on the original buildings represent the practical and the fine arts.

The North Campus Quadrangle contains four great arches on the main avenues entering and exiting the campus:

- Hudson Gate on Amsterdam Avenue
- George Washington Gate at 138th Street and Convent Avenue
- Alexander Hamilton Gate at the northern edge of Convent Avenue
- Peter Stuyvesant Gate at St. Nicholas Terrace (only the southern base remaining).

The New York Landmarks Preservation Commission made the North Campus Quadrangle buildings and the College Gates official landmarks in 1981. The buildings in the Quadrangle were put on the State and National Register of Historic Places in 1984.

=== Postwar buildings ===
Steinman Hall, which houses the School of Engineering, was erected in 1962 on the north end of the campus, on the site of the Bowker Library and the Drill Hall to replace the facilities in Compton Hall and Goethals Hall, and was named for David Barnard Steinman (CCNY Class of 1906), a well known civil engineer and bridge designer.

The Administration Building was erected in 1963 on the North Campus across from Wingate Hall. It houses the institution's administration offices, including the President's, Provost's and the Registrar's offices. It was originally intended as a warehouse to store the huge number of records and transcripts of students since 1847. The first floor of the Administration Building was given a postmodern renovation in 2004. In early 2007, the Administration Building was formally named the Howard E. Wille Administration Building, in honor of Howard E. Wille, class of 1955, a distinguished alumnus and philanthropist.

The Marshak Science Building was completed in 1971 on the site of the former Jasper Oval, an open space previously used as a football field. The building was named after Robert Marshak, renowned physicist and president of CCNY (1970–1979). The Marshak building houses all science labs and adjoins the Mahoney Gymnasium and its athletic facilities.

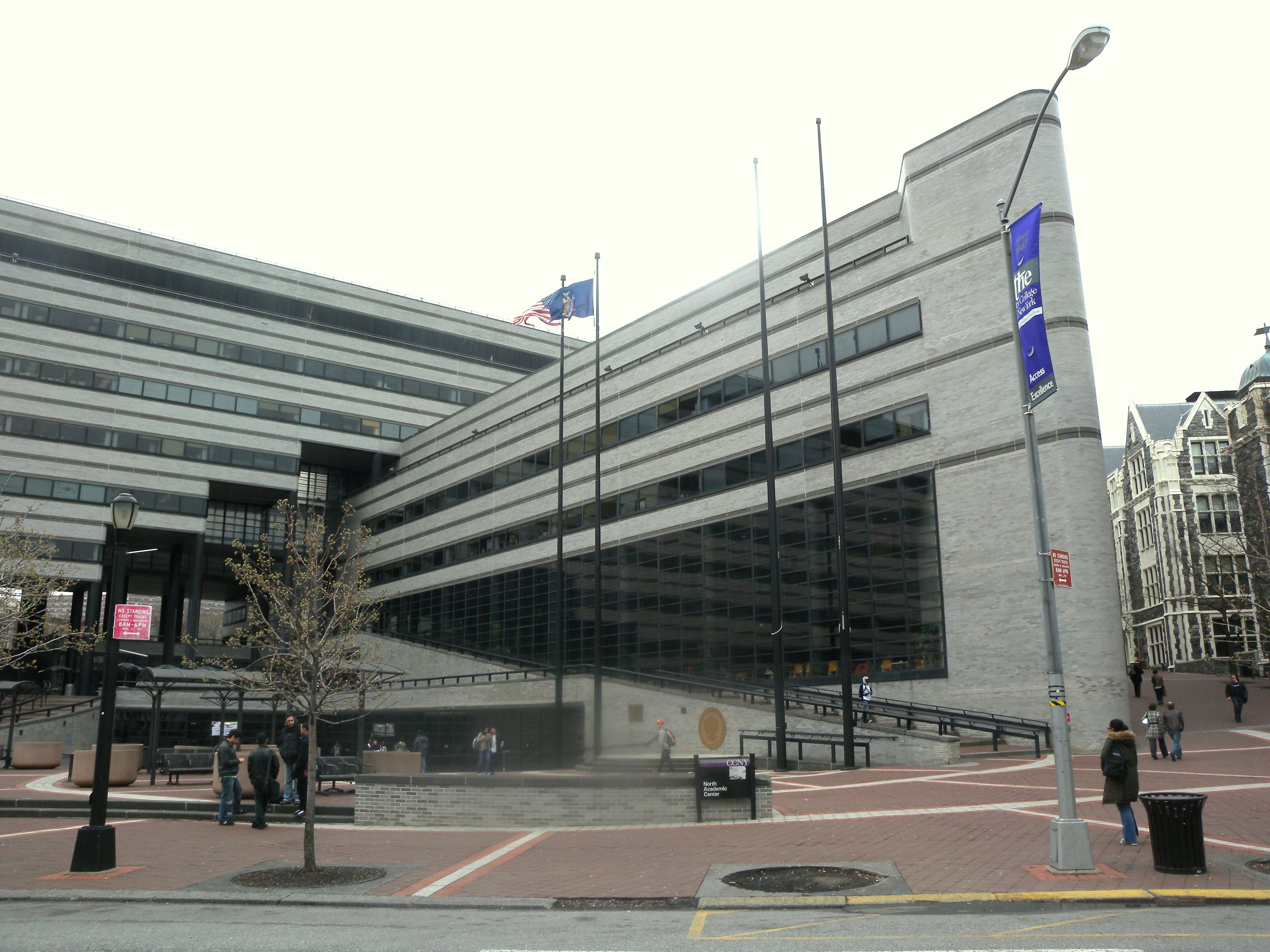
North Academic Center (2011)

In the 1970s, construction of the massive North Academic Center (NAC) was initiated. It was completed in 1984, and replaced Lewisohn Stadium and Klapper Hall. The NAC was designed by John Carl Warnecke. A student lounge space has murals celebrating the history of the campus on the doors of the undergraduate Student Government.

=== South Campus ===
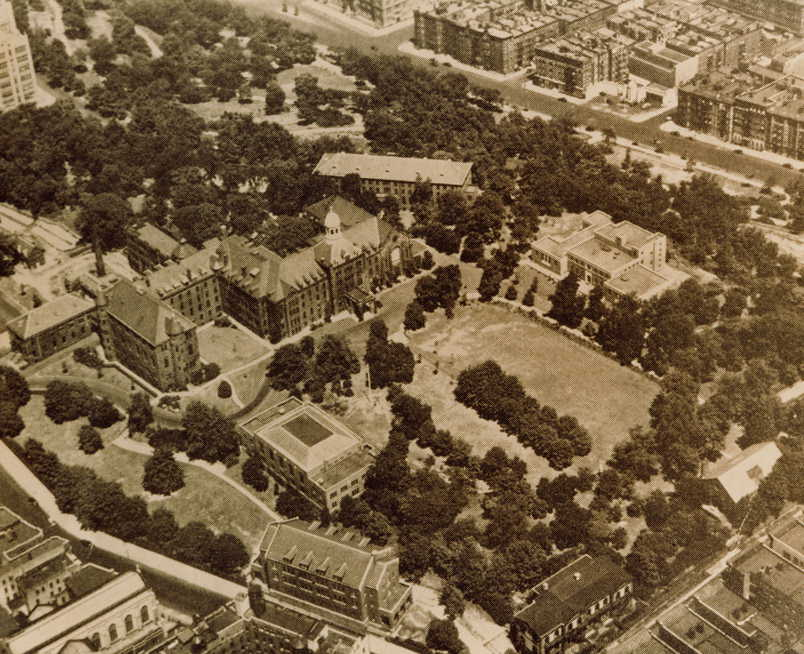
1950s aerial view of the old South Campus of City College, bought in 1953 from Manhattanville College of the Sacred Heart. The photo is taken from the south looking northeast.

The same view but annotated. Click to enlarge and see annotation.

In 1953, CCNY bought the campus of the Manhattanville College of the Sacred Heart (which, on a 1913 map, was shown as The Convent of the Sacred Heart), which added a south section to the campus. This expanded the campus to include many of the buildings in the area between 140th Street to 130th Street, from St. Nicholas Terrace in the east to Amsterdam Avenue in the west.

As a result of this expansion, the South Campus of CCNY housed mainly liberal arts classes and departments. The North Campus was mainly dedicated to sciences and engineering and the school of education.

In 1957, a new library building was erected in the middle of the campus, near 135th Street on the South Campus, and named Cohen Library, after Morris Raphael Cohen, an alumnus and philosopher. It was later renamed the 'Y' building, then gutted.

In the 1970s, many of the old buildings of the South Campus were demolished, some that had been used by the Academy of the Sacred Heart. The buildings remaining on the South Campus at this time were the Cohen Library (later moved into the North Academic Center), Park Gym (now the Structural Biology Research Center (NYSBC)), Eisner Hall (built in 1941 by Manhattanville College of the Sacred Heart as a library, later remodeled and housed CCNY's Art Department), the Schiff House (former President's residence, now a child care center), and Mott Hall (formerly the English Department, now a New York City Department of Education primary school).

Some of the buildings that were demolished at that time were Finley Hall (housed The Finley Student Center, student activities center, originally built in 1888–1890 as Manhattanville Academy's main building, and purchased in 1953 by City College), Wagner Hall, (which housed various social science and liberal arts departments and classes, originally built as a dormitory for Manhattanville Academy, and was named in honor of Robert F. Wagner Sr., member of the Class of 1898, who represented New York State for 23 years in the United States Senate), Stieglitz Hall, and Downer Hall, among others.

==== New South Campus buildings ====
Several new buildings were erected on the South Campus, including Aaron Davis Hall in 1981 and the Herman Goldman sports field in 1993. In August 2006, the institution completed the construction of a 600-bed dormitory, called "The Towers."

The building that formerly housed Cohen Library, the "Y" building, became the new home for the School of Architecture, with the renovation headed by architect Rafael Viñoly. Near the 133rd Street gate, the Herman Goldman sports field was shuttered in 2006 in favor of two new scientific education and research facilities: a four-story structure for students and a six-story building for faculty/graduate research.

In 2007, two new buildings had been proposed for the South Campus site by the Dormitory Authority of the State of New York (DASNY). One was a four-story Science Building, to serve as an adjunct to the Marshak Science Building on the North Campus, and the other was a six-story Advanced Science Research Center (ASRC). Designed by Kohn Pedersen Fox Associates, the ASRC—serving visiting scientists and the whole CUNY system—and the Center for Discovery and Innovation occupy the Herman Goldman sports field's site. The buildings are linked by a tunnel. In total, these two buildings have 400,000 square feet (37,000 m^{2}) of laboratories, offices, an auditorium, and meeting rooms.

=== Demolished buildings ===
==== Downtown campus ====
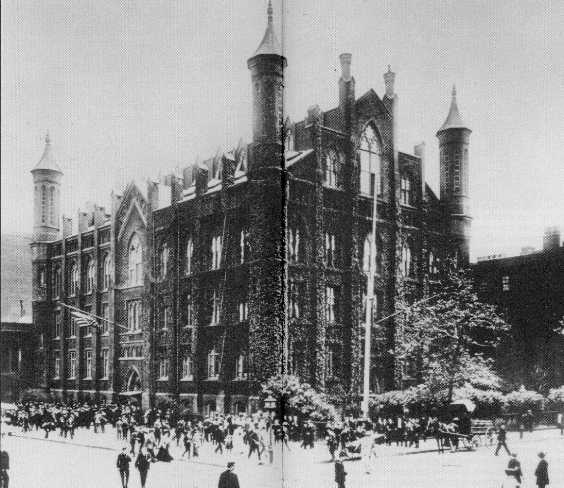
The Free Academy at Lexington Avenue and 23rd Street in New York City in the 1900s

City College's original campus, the Free Academy Building, existed from 1849 to 1907. The building was designed by James Renwick Jr. and was located at Lexington Avenue and 23rd Street in Gramercy Park. According to some sources, it was the first Gothic Revival college building on the East Coast. Renwick's building was demolished in 1928, and replaced in 1930 with a 16-story structure that is part of the present-day Baruch College campus.

==== Lewisohn Stadium ====
In the early 1900s, after most of the Neo-Gothic campus had been built, CCNY President John H. Finley wanted the college to have a stadium to replace the existing inadequate facilities. New York City did not provide the money needed to build a stadium, but donated two city blocks south of the campus which were open park land. In 1912, businessman and philanthropist Adolph Lewisohn donated $75,000 for the stadium's construction and Finley commissioned architect Arnold W. Brunner to design Lewisohn Stadium.

Lewisohn Stadium, a Doric-colonnaded amphitheater, was dedicated on May 29, 1915, two years after Finley had left his post at the College. The stadium seated 6,000 people, but thousands more seats could be made available on the infield during concerts and ceremonies. College graduations were held in Lewisohn Stadium for many years. The last graduation ceremony was held at Lewisohn Stadium in 1973 shortly before it was demolished.

==== Other demolished buildings ====
A separate library building originally planned in 1912 for the campus was never built. Ground was broken on March 25, 1927, for a free-standing library to be built on St. Nicholas Terrace, between St. Nicholas and 141st Streets. Only one-fifth of the original library plan was constructed at a cost of $850,000, far above the $150,000 alumni had collected to establish a library at the original Amsterdam Avenue and 140th Street site. The Bowker/Alumni Library stood at the present site of the Steinman Engineering building until 1957.

The Hebrew Orphan Asylum was erected in 1884 on Amsterdam Avenue between 136th and 138th Streets, and was designed by William H. Hume. It was already there when City College moved to upper Manhattan. When it closed in the 1940s, the building was used by City College to house members of the U.S. Armed Forces assigned to the Army Specialized Training Program (ASTP). From 1946 to 1955, it was used as a dormitory, library, and classroom space for the college. It was called "Army Hall" until it was demolished in 1955 and 1956.

In 1946, CCNY purchased a former Episcopal orphanage on 135th Street and Convent Avenue (North campus), and renamed it Klapper Hall, after Paul Klapper (Class of 1904) Professor and the Dean of School of Education and who was later the first president of Queens College/CUNY (1937–1952). Klapper Hall was red brick in Georgian style and served until 1983 as home of the School of Education.

==== Campus location ====
The institution is located between West 130th and West 141st Streets in Manhattan, bordered on the west by Amsterdam Avenue and on the east, St. Nicholas Terrace. The campus is bisected by Convent Avenue. The college has a small satellite unit called the Center for Worker Education in the Wall Street area.

==== Public transit access ====
Two New York City Subway stations are near the campus. The subway stop nearest the campus is the 1 train's 137th Street–City College station on Broadway. In addition, a subway station serving the A, B, C, and D trains on West 145th Street and Nicholas Avenue is close to the campus. That station is four-tenths of a mile or a ten-minute walk to the campus. The college's dedicated bus service, which runs when classes are in session, also connects the campus to the 145th Street station. Metropolitan Transportation Authority bus routes serving City College include the M3, M11, M100, M101 and Bx33 buses.

== Academics ==
Undergraduate demographics as of fall 2023
Race and ethnicity	Total
Hispanic	40%
Asian	25%
Black	16%
White	12%
International student	4%
Two or more races	3%
Economic diversity
Low-income (Note: The percentage of students who received an income-based federal Pell grant intended for low-income students.)	61%
Affluent (Note: The percentage of students who are a part of the American middle class at the bare minimum.)	39%

The City College of New York is organized into four schools, plus the Macaulay Honors College. The four schools of the City College of New York are the Colin Powell School for Civic and Global Leadership, The Bernard and Anne Spitzer School of Architecture, The School of Education, and The Grove School of Engineering. The CUNY School of Medicine, which had been part of City College, is transitioning into an independent institution although it will remain on the City College campus. In addition to the four schools, there's the Division of Humanities and Arts, the Division of Science, and the Division of Interdisciplinary Studies at the Center of for Worker Education.

=== Rankings ===
For the 2023–2024 academic year, the City College of New York achieved earned the following national rankings:

- ARWU: 118 - 144
- Forbes: 167
- THE/WSJ: 212
- US News & World: 105
- Washington Monthly: 185
- QS: 185

=== Physics ===
Albert Einstein gave the first of his series of United States lectures at the City College of New York in 1921. Three CCNY alumni went on to become Nobel laureates in physics: Robert Hofstadter in 1961, Arno Penzias in 1978, and Leon Lederman in 1988. Robert Marshak was also a distinguished alumnus.

Physicist alumni and past faculty include Robert Marshak, Mark Zemansky, Clarence Zener, Mitchell Feigenbaum, Robert Alfano, Myriam Sarachik, Leonard Susskind, and Michio Kaku.

== Research ==
=== Advanced Science Research Center ===
CCNY hosts a research center focusing on nanotechnology, structural biology, photonics, neuroscience and environmental sciences.

=== CUNY Dominican Studies Institute ===
Part of CCNY's Colin Powell School for Civic and Global Leadership, the CUNY Dominican Studies Institute is the nation's only university-based research center devoted to "the history of the Dominican Republic and people of Dominican descent in the United States and across the wider Dominican diaspora."

=== CUNY Energy Institute ===
The CUNY Energy Institute conducts research on renewable energy.

== College seal and medal logo ==
The design of the three-faced college seal refers to Janus, the Roman god of beginnings, whose two faces connect the past and the future. The seal was redesigned for the college's Centennial Medal in 1947 by Albert P. d'Andrea (class of 1918). D'Andrea later was a professor of art at CCNY.

In 2003, administrators at the institution decided to create a logo distinct from its seal, with the stylized text "the City College of New York."

== Athletics ==
Olympic gold medalist Henry Wittenberg was co-captain of the CCNY wrestling team in 1939 during his undergraduate studies. After participating in two Olympics, he then taught wrestling at CCNY. In 1977, he was inducted into the National Wrestling Hall of Fame.

Basketball hall of fame inductee Nat Holman coached the CCNY basketball team in three different stints during the 1950s. Under Holman, CCNY became the only team in men's college basketball history to win both the National Invitation Tournament and the NCAA Tournament in the same year (1950). However, this accomplishment was overshadowed by the 1951 college basketball point-shaving scandal in which seven CCNY basketball players were arrested in 1951 for taking money from gamblers to affect the outcome of games.

From 1934 until 1941, future NFL Hall of Fame inductee Benny Friedman was the football coach at City College.

In 1938, future four-time Olympian Daniel Bukantz was the intercollegiate foil champion. Future Olympian James Strauch fenced for CCNY, graduating in 1942. In 1948, future Olympian Abram Cohen was a member of the NCAA Champion CCNY team. That same year, future five-time Olympian Albert Axelrod was U.S. Intercollegiate Fencing Association and NCAA Champion in foil. Harold Goldsmith, a future three-time Olympian, won the 1952 NCAA foil championship while at CCNY.

== Art ==
The City College of New York and its resident art collection were founded in 1847. The collection contains roughly one thousand eight hundred works of art ranging from the historical to the contemporary. A portion of the collection was obtained through donations and Percent for Art.

The collection includes works by Edwin Howland Blashfield, Walter Pach, Charles Alston, Raphael Soyer, Louis Lozowick, Stephen Parrish, Paul Adolphe Rajon, Mariano Fortuny, Marilyn Bridges, Lucien Clergue, Elliott Erwitt, Andreas Feininger, Harold Feinstein, Larry Fink, Sally Gall, Ralph Gibson, Jerome Liebling, Robert Mapplethorpe, Mary Ellen Mark, Joel Meyerowitz, Dorothy Norman and Gilles Peress. Works from the collection include several Keith Haring prints and Edward Curtis's The North American Indian.

There is currently no art museum at City College; thus, much of the collection is not on view. Undergraduate students interact with the collection through classes. There are, however, three locations where student-created or curated artwork can be seen on campus: Compton-Goethals Gallery, the Cohen Library Archives Gallery, and Windows on Amsterdam. The Library Archives Gallery shows artwork from around the world, as well as from the CCNY community, and typically curates an annual Women Make Art exhibition.

== In books, films, and popular culture ==
- The central character in Woody Allen's short story "The Kugelmass Episode", published in Side Effects, is a lovesick City College humanities professor.
- Clay, one of the principal characters in Rumaan Alam's 2020 novel Leave the World Behind is a professor at City College.

== See also ==
- Rosenberg/Humphrey Program in Public Policy fellowship
- Timeline of New York City
- 1949–50 CCNY Beavers men's basketball team
- State University of New York
