= Knickerbocker Sailing Association =

LGBTQ sailing club in New York City

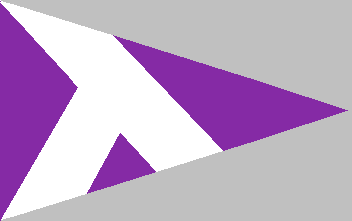
Burgee of Knickerbocker Sailing Association.

The Knickerbocker Sailing Association (KSA) is a members club set up by and for gay, lesbian, bisexual, and transgender sailors in New York, New Jersey, Connecticut, and Rhode Island. KSA membership is open to all LGBTQ and straight people, and it has a goal of being a "friendly, nonjudgmental group of people that have joined the club to share new life experiences, on the water together".

== History ==
KSA began in 1994, when founder Braden Toan asked around on Fire Island to find fellow people interested in establishing a gay sailing club. It had an inaugural trip in August 1994, when 13 gay men met in Jersey City for a sail aboard a 38-foot Irwin cruiser.

In 2018, KSA had more than 150 members. Its fleet includes both sailboats and powerboats. While some members have extensive sailing experience, no sailing experience is necessary to join. KSA hosts various flotillas throughout the tri-state area, from Atlantic Highlands to Block Island to Provincetown. Captains provide their own vessels, and crew participate in helping to sail boats with other members; boat ownership is not required to join. Members include people who run charter boat companies, live on their boats, or just sail for fun.

== Events ==
KSA participates in the Annual Stonewall Sails Regatta, an official event of New York's Heritage of Pride's Gay Pride Week. KSA races with J/24s on the Hudson River and in the past has partnered with Hudson River Community Sailing, who has provided the racing boats. KSA works with Hudson River Community Sailing as another group that supports diversity in sailing, in particular through maritime education for students in local public high schools.

During Pride week, KSA hosts a floating parade with sailboats decorated in flags, along with sometimes participating in decorated boats in New York's dry parade. Gilbert Baker, designer of the rainbow flag, was a member and created rainbow sails for KSA boats for these occasions.

Fundraising is a focus during KSA's Pride events, benefiting other non-profit organizations such as AmfAR, Rocking the Boat, Callen-Lourde, and the New Jersey Community Research Initiative.

KSA teams have participated in several Gay Games.

The club also organizes flotillas for visiting local destinations, such as New London, Connecticut.
