= Grove School of Engineering =

City University of New York's school of engineering

Coordinates: 40.8194°N 73.9500°W

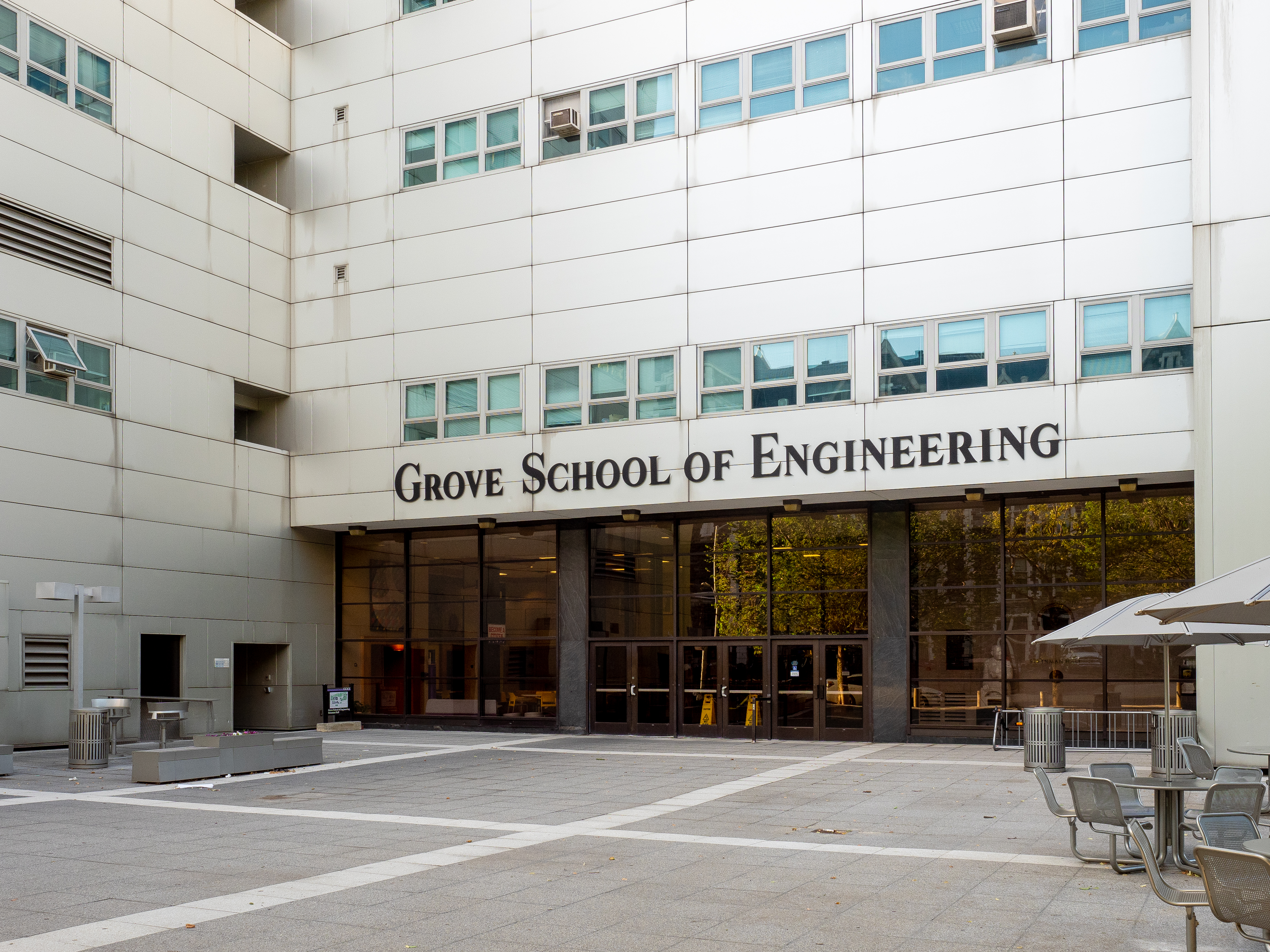
The Grove School of Engineering—Steinman Hall at City College of New York

The Grove School of Engineering (GSoE) is the engineering school of the City College of New York (CCNY), a public university system in New York City and part of the City University of New York (CUNY) system. It is one of the five schools of City College and CUNY's primary school of engineering.

The GSoE is housed in the Steinman Hall, located in the northern side of the City College of New York's campus. It offers undergraduate and graduate engineering education. It includes 15 research institutes covering all major areas of engineering, including: Biomedical engineering, chemical engineering, electrical engineering, mechanical engineering, civil engineering, and environmental engineering. The school currently has over five hundred students and 110 faculty on staff.

In October 2005, the former CCNY Engineering School became the Grove School of Engineering after Andrew Grove, an alumnus of the school and co-founder of the Intel Corporation, made the largest single donation that the CCNY had ever received. Grove's donation of $26 million was used to fund research and equipment.
