= Knickerbocker Field Club =

- U.S. National Register of Historic Places
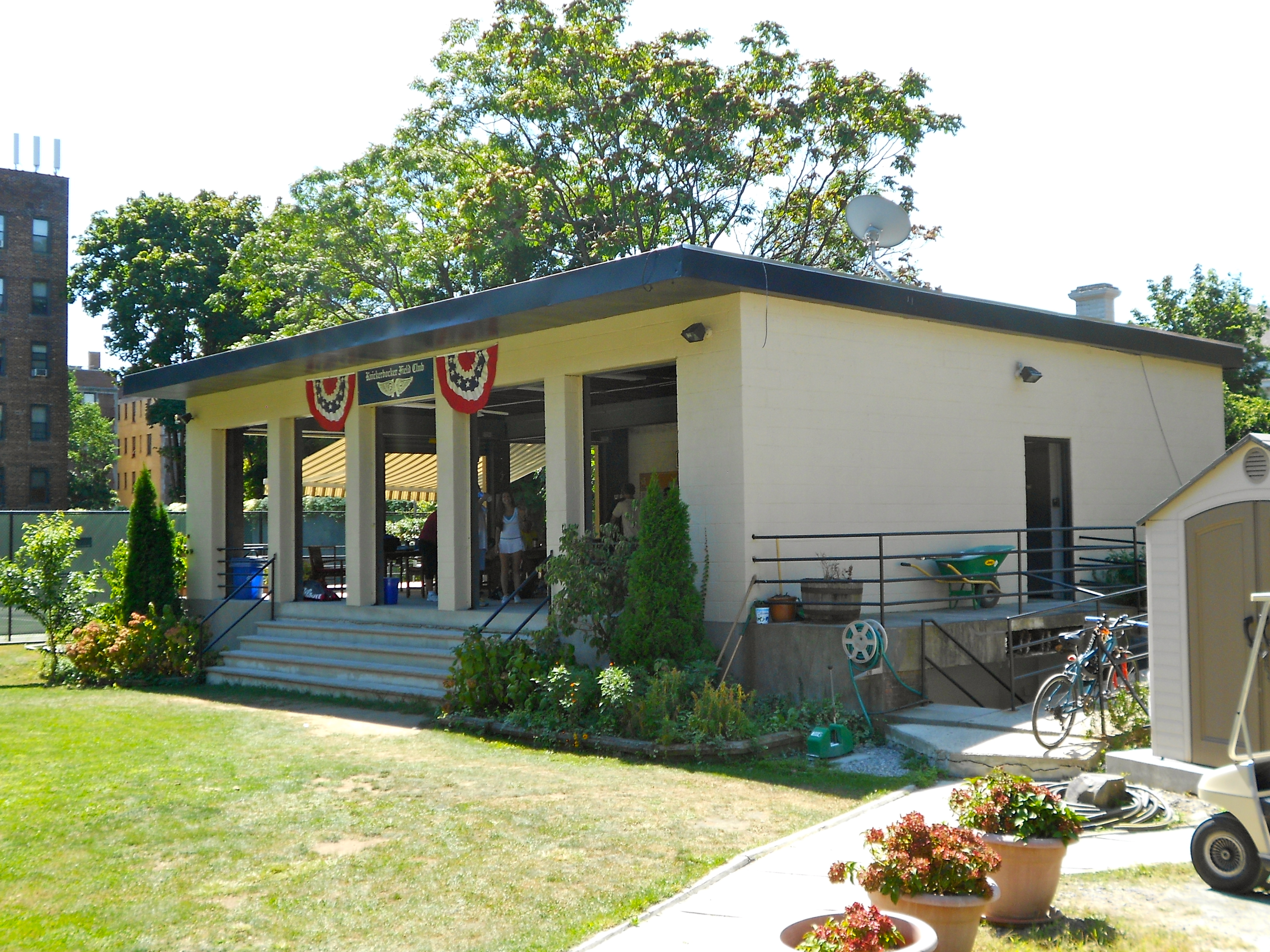
- Knickerbocker Field Club on the NRHP since October 29, 1982, destroyed 1988 in a fire. This is what was built in its place. At 114 E. 18th St., Brooklyn, New York

- Location within New York City Location within New York Location within the United States
- Location: 114 E. 18th St., New York, New York
- Coordinates: 40°38′52″N 73°57′49″W
- Area: less than one acre
- Built: 1892
- Architect: Partitt Brothers
- Architectural style: Colonial Revival
- NRHP reference No.: 82001180
- Added to NRHP: October 29, 1982

Knickerbocker Field Club is a historic tennis association located in Flatbush, Brooklyn, New York, New York. It was founded in 1889, and continues to operate to this day.

Its historic tennis clubhouse was built in 1892 and was the sole surviving building associated with the Tennis Court development until 1988, when it was partially destroyed by fire. It was razed in 1992 with the approval of the Landmark Preservation Commission due to lack of funds for restoration. It was a long, two story Colonial Revival style building sheathed in clapboard and shingles. It had a gambrel roof and featured a deep porch supported by Doric order columns. It was listed on the National Register of Historic Places in 1982. A replacement clubhouse was built after.

The club features 5 clay courts. It has an active roster of 160 members, with a waiting list to join. The Knickerbocker also offers a free summer program for neighborhood children.
