= Knickerbocker Case =

Antisemitism case against City College of New York

The Knickerbocker Case at the City College of New York (CCNY) between 1945 and 1950 involved accusations of antisemitism against a department chairman, investigations by university, city, and state authorities, as well as by the American Jewish Congress, and the first widespread student strike in the United States.

== Accusations ==
William E. Knickerbocker had graduated from City College in 1904 and joined the faculty in 1907, teaching Spanish and French. He earned his Ph.D. from Columbia in 1911. He had been Chairman of the Department of Romance Languages, an elected position, since 1938. By one account, antisemitism was endemic in certain academic areas in the 1930s to the extent that a Jewish professor, Bernard Levy, could not find a publisher without enlisting his non-Jewish colleague, Knickerbocker, as co-author of his Modern Spanish Prose Readings, 1830–1930.

On April 9, 1945, four members of the Department of Romance Languages—Elliott H. Pollinger, Ephraim Cross, Otto Müller, and Pedro Bach-y-Rita—sent a letter to the president of the college accusing William E. Knickerbocker of antisemitism. They contended that Knickerbocker had made antisemitic remarks and denied the Ward Medal for proficiency in French to a Jewish student, Morton Gurewitch, because he was Jewish.

In April 1947, CCNY administrators issued a report finding that a clerical error had led to the denial of the Ward Medal to Gurewitch. Gurewitch was later issued a duplicate medal.

== Investigations ==
On December 16, 1946, New York City's Board of Higher Education unanimously adopted the report of a special committee that found the accusations against Knickerbocker "totally unsubstantiated." In response, the New York City Council's special committee on discrimination conducted its own investigation and determined that Knickerbocker had made antisemitic jokes and treated Jewish students contemptuously. In June 1948, it recommended that CCNY remove Knickerbocker and restore Bach-y-Rita and Pollinger to the list of recommendations for promotion, from which both professors had been removed in retaliation for their charges against Knickerbocker.

The City Council voted to accept the committee's report. Administrators at CCNY delayed Knickerbocker's dismissal. A faculty committee produced a report that exonerated Knickerbocker and the faculty adopted it by a 46–9 vote.

The American Jewish Congress conducted an investigation and concluded that Knickerbocker demonstrated a "philosophy and program of anti-semitism." In September 1948, twenty students walked out of Knickerbocker's class. Rabbi Arthur Zuckerman, director of the campus chapter of Hillel, attempted to negotiate with the school to allow students to transfer into other classes.

== Dormitory segregation ==
In 1948, a faculty committee found that the professor in charge of the Army Hall dormitory, William E. Davis, had segregated the dormitory during World War II. Davis was removed from his post as director of the dormitory, but retained his position as a tenured professor in the economics department.

== Student strike ==
In October 1948, 2,000 students held a fiery meeting and a "sit-down" to demand the removal of Knickerbocker from the faculty. CCNY administrators suspended classes. In April 1949, the student council voted to hold a general student strike to demand the trial and removal of both Knickerbocker and Davis. On April 11, students battled police in "near riot proportions," some shouting "Jim Crow must go." Sixteen students were arrested. Some 65 percent of students stayed away from classes. The student council of the business school voted to condemn the strike.

== Aftermath ==
Bach-y-Rita and Pollinger asked State Education Commissioner, Francis T. Spaulding, to order the Board of Higher Education to file formal charges against Knickerbocker. In February 1950, the Board of Higher Education, which had originally dismissed the complaint against Knickerbocker, declared that there was no reason to reopen its investigation. It also declined to address the restoration of Bach-y-Rita and Pollinger to the list of recommendations for promotion. Spaulding supported the Board.

Several days later, Knickerbocker announced that he would not stand as a candidate for re-election as chairman of the Department of Romance Languages, though he would continue as a professor.

A July 1950 report by the Associate Alumni of City College stated that "[i]t cannot be said with any degree of certainty that Prof. William E. Knickerbocker was antisemitic. By the same token, it likewise cannot be said with any degree of certainty that he was not." Regarding Davis, who had been found guilty of maintaining segregated dormitories in Army Hall, the alumni wrote that his actions were "ill-considered rather than motivated by racial bias," although it approved of his removal as director of the dormitory by the president of the college.

Knickerbocker retired in 1955 and died on December 21, 1960, at the age of 75 at St. Luke's Hospital in New York.

CCNY alumni continued to commemorate the 1949 strike, which for many students marked the beginning of their political involvement in progressive causes and in civil rights.
