= Knickerbocker Hotel (Milwaukee, Wisconsin) =

- U.S. National Register of Historic Places
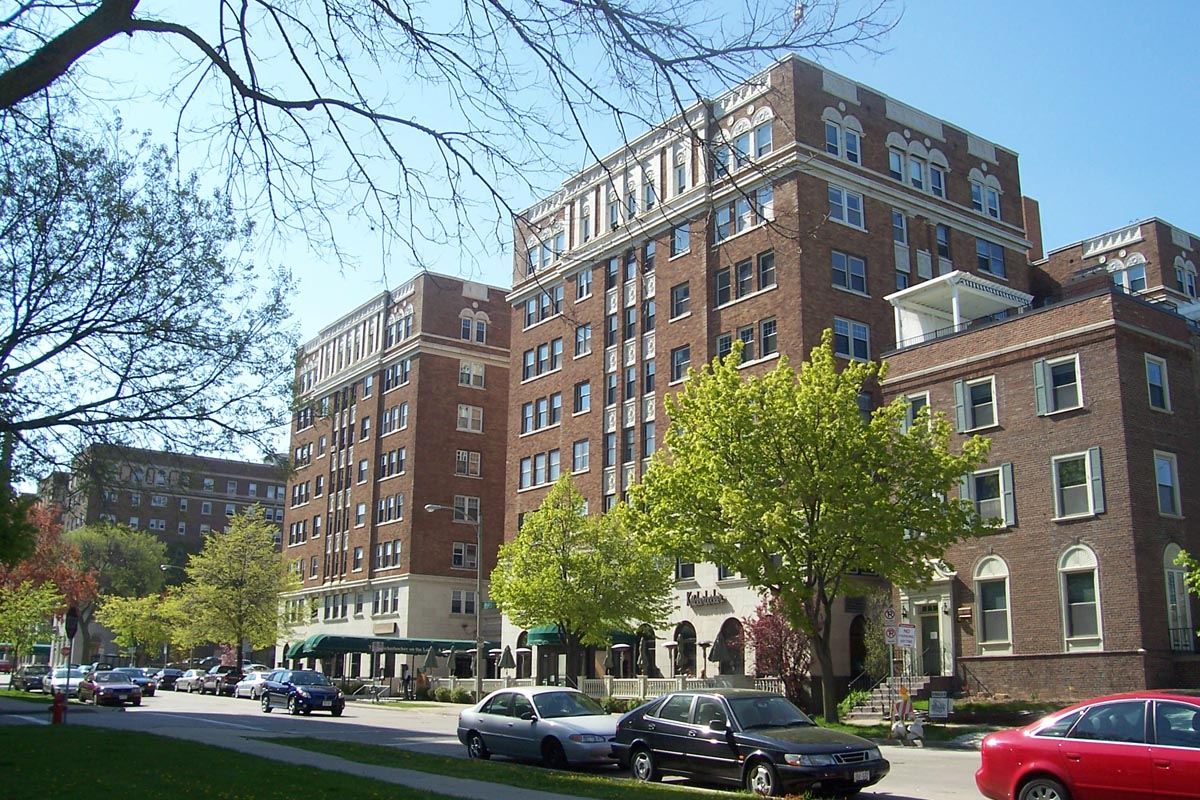
- Knickerbocker Hotel
- Location: 1028 E. Juneau Ave; Milwaukee, Wisconsin
- Coordinates: 43.0460°N 87.8987°W
- Architect: Rossman & Wierdsma
- Architectural style: Classical Revival
- NRHP reference No.: 88000680
- Added to NRHP: June 2, 1988

The Knickerbocker on the Lake is a historic hotel opened in 1929, located in the Yankee Hill neighborhood of downtown Milwaukee, Wisconsin. It was built as an eight-story residential apartment hotel. In 1988 it was listed on the National Register of Historic Places.

== Description ==
The Knickerbocker's neighborhood was called Yankee Hill because many of Milwaukee's early leaders living there in the 1800s were Yankees from New England. They liked the neighborhood because it was close to the downtown and had nice views along Lake Michigan. It was also part of Milwaukee's "Gold Coast". By 1900 many of the prominent Yankees living there had been replaced by prominent German and Irish.

After 1900 many of the big old single-family homes were divided into rooming houses, and some were razed to make space for apartment buildings and residential hotels. These allowed more middle and upper-class people to live at a prestigious address close to downtown without the cost or trouble of maintaining their own free-standing home. The Astor Hotel was one like this, built in 1916 and expanded in 1925. Very similar, the Knickerbocker was built just up Juneau Avenue in 1929.

The Knickerbocker Hotel was designed by architects Rossman & Wierdsma of Milwaukee in late Neo-Classical Revival style, somewhat simplified as fashion shifted toward Art Deco and more modern styles. The building was generally U-shaped, eight stories tall. The exterior is reddish brick decorated with terra cotta. The first two floors are covered with terra cotta panels. The eighth floor is set off with a terra cotta cornice. The windows on that floor are surrounded by pilasters and window hoods decorated with wreaths and foliage. Inside, the first floor housed an elegant lobby and retail space. Above that each floor held about 30 apartments. For many years it was owned by the Kaiser family and known as the Kaiser Knickerbocker Hotel.

The Knickerbocker on the Lake bills itself a boutique hotel, with suites decorated in styles varying from Victorian to French Country. A number of the rooms are now owner-occupied.

From 1994 to 2011, the hotel housed the Osterio del Mondo, which had been rated a top hotel restaurant by Zagat/USA Today.
