= Yale Law & Policy Review =

Journal

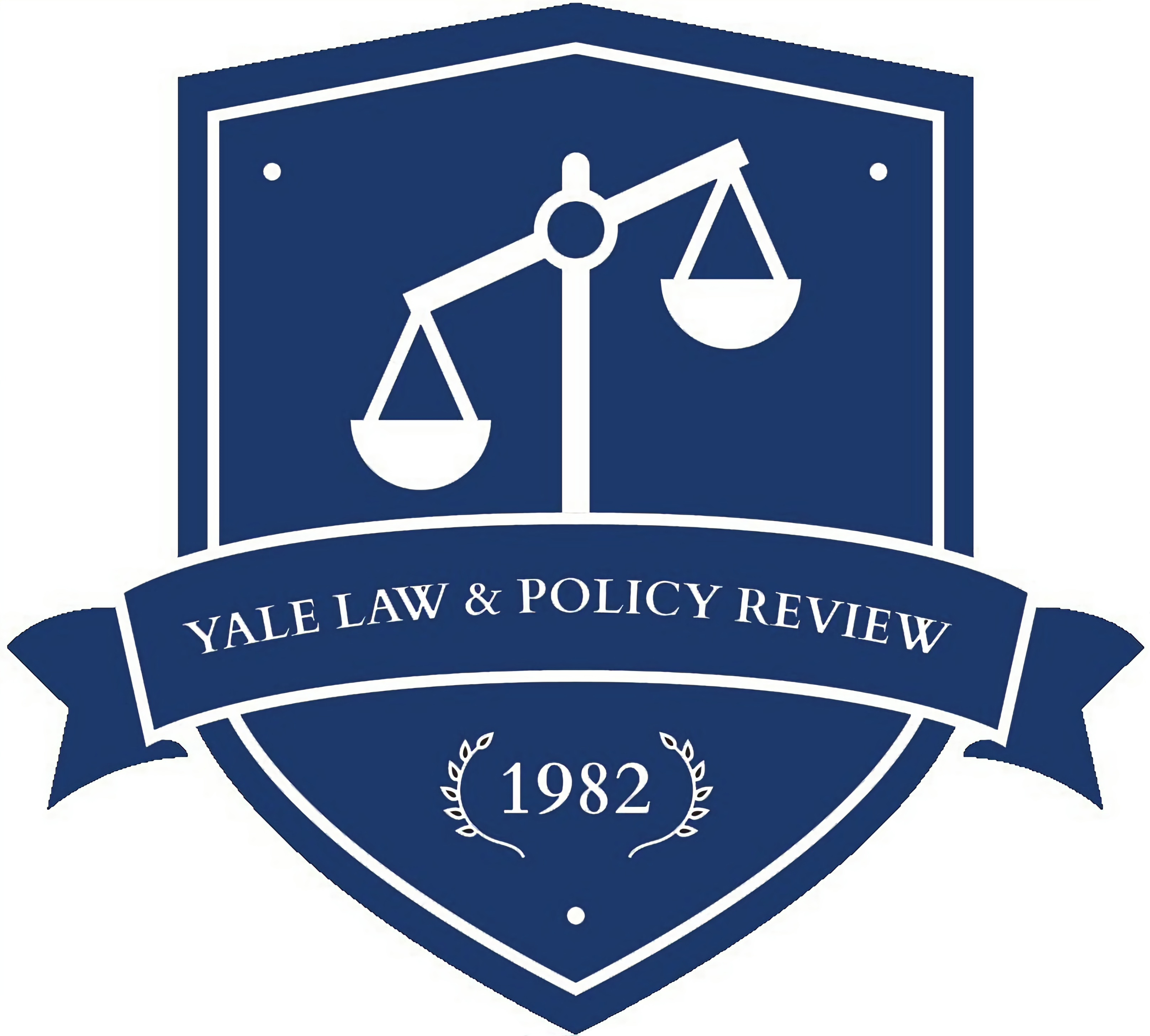
- Discipline: Law
- Language: English
- Edited by: Matthew Sexton

Publication details
- History: 1982-present
- Publisher: Yale Law School (United States)
- Frequency: Biannual

Standard abbreviations
- Bluebook: Yale L. & Pol'y Rev.
- ISO 4: Yale Law Policy Rev.

Indexing
- ISSN: 0740-8048
- LCCN: 83646346
- OCLC no.: 9586836

Links
- Journal homepage; Online access; Online archive

The Yale Law & Policy Review (YLPR) is a biannual student-run law review founded in 1982 at the Yale Law School. YLPR publishes scholarship at the intersection of law and policy authored by lawmakers, judges, practitioners, academics, and students. YLPR also publishes shorter, timely pieces on its online forum, Inter Alia.

Past contributors include Supreme Court Justices Ruth Bader Ginsburg, John Paul Stevens, and Clarence Thomas; President Bill Clinton; Vice President Al Gore; Secretaries of State Hillary Clinton and Cyrus Vance; Senators Bill Bradley, Chris Coons, Tom Daschle John Edwards, Bill Frist, Ted Kennedy, Frank Lautenberg, Joe Lieberman, Arlen Specter, and Tom Udall; Governor Michael Dukakis, Ambassador John Negroponte; and Professors Richard Epstein, Harold Koh, Robert Post, and Cass Sunstein.

== Notable authors and articles ==
- Deepak Gupta and Lina Khan (2017). "Arbitration as Wealth Transfer" Yale Law & Policy Review. 35: 495.
- William Jefferson Clinton (2014). "The Voting Rights Umbrella". Yale Law & Policy Review. 33: 383.
- Janet Napolitano (2014). "Only Yes Means Yes: An Essay on University Policies regarding Sexual Violence and Sexual Assault". Yale Law & Policy Review. 33: 387.
- Dana Remus (2012). "The Institutional Politics of Federal Judicial Conduct Regulation." Yale Law & Policy Review. 31: 33.
- Owen Fiss (2012). "Even in a Time of Terror". Yale Law & Policy Review. 31: 1.
- John Paul Stevens and Linda Greenhouse (2011). "A Conversation with Justice Stevens". Yale Law & Policy Review. 30: 304.
- Marin K. Levy; Kate Stith; and Jose A. Cabranes (2009). "The Costs of Judging Judges by the Numbers". Yale Law & Policy Review. 28: 313.
- William H. Pryor, Jr. (2006). "The Religious Faith and Judicial Duty of an American Catholic Judge". Yale Law & Policy Review. 24: 347.
- Dan M. Kahan and Donald Braman (2006). "Cultural Cognition and Public Policy". Yale Law & Policy Review. 24: 149.
- Hillary Rodham Clinton (2005). "Brown at Fifty: Fulfilling the Promise". Yale Law & Policy Review. 23: 213.
- Robert Post (2005). "Affirmative Action and Higher Education: The View from Somewhere". Yale Law & Policy Review. 23: 25.
- John Podesta and Raj Goyle (2005). "Lost in Cyberspace? Finding American Liberties in a Dangerous Digital World."
- Ruth Bader Ginsburg (2004). "Looking Beyond Our Borders: The Value of a Comparative Perspective in Constitutional Adjudication". Yale Law & Policy Review. 22: 329.
- Judith S. Kaye (2004). "Delivering Justice Today: A Problem-Solving Approach". Yale Law & Policy Review. 22: 125.
- Charles J. Ogletree Jr. (2002). "From Pretoria to Philadelphia: Judge Higginbotham's Racial Justice Jurisprudence on South Africa and the United States". Yale Law & Policy Review. 20: 383.
- Shira A. Scheindlin and John Elofson (1998). "Judges, Juries, and Sexual Harassment". Yale Law & Policy Review. 17: 813.
- Stacey Y. Abrams (1998). "Devolution's Discord: Resolving Operational Dissonance with the UBIT Exemption". Yale Law & Policy Review.17: 877.
- Judith Resnik and Emily Bazelon (1998). "Legal Services: Then and Now". Yale Law & Policy Review. 17: 291.
- Robert W. Sweet (1998). "Civil Gideon and Confidence in a Just Society". Yale Law & Policy Review. 17: 503.
- Joseph Lieberman (1997). "The Politics of Money and the Road to Self-Destruction". Yale Law & Policy Review. 16: 425.
- Michael S. Dukakis (1992). "Hawaii and Massachusetts: Lessons from the States". Yale Law & Policy Review. 10: 397.
- Eleanor Holmes Norton (1990). "The End of the Griggs Economy: Doctrinal Adjustment for the New American Workplace". Yale Law & Policy Review. 8: 197.
- Harold Hongju Koh (1988). "Overview: Four Dichotomies in American Trade Policy". Yale Law & Policy Review. 6: 4.
- Susan Rose-Ackerman (1988). "Public Policy in the Public Interest". Yale Law & Policy Review. 6: 505.
- Clarence Thomas (1986). "Affirmative Action Goals and Timetables: Too Tough? Not Tough Enough!," Yale Law & Policy Review. 5: 402.
- Marian Wright Edelman and James D. Weill (1985). "Investing in our Children". Yale Law & Policy Review. 4: 331.
- Edward M. Kennedy (1985). "Reconsidering Social Welfare Policy: Introduction". Yale Law & Policy Review. 4: 1.
- Maxine F. Singer (1984). "Genetics and the Law: A Scientist's View". Yale Law & Policy Review. 3: 315.
- Albert Gore, Jr. and Steve Owens (1984) "The Challenge of Biotechnology". Yale Law & Policy Review. 3: 336.
- Stephen L. Carter (1984). "The Bellman, the Snark, and the Biohazard Debate". Yale Law & Policy Review. 3: 358.
- Richard Neely (1984). "The Primary Caretaker Parent Rule: Child Custody and the Dynamics of Greed". Yale Law & Policy Review. 3: 168.
- Catharine A. MacKinnon (1983). "Not A Moral Issue". Yale Law & Policy Review. 3: 321.
- Cyrus R. Vance (1982). "Reforming the Electoral Reforms". Yale Law & Policy Review. 1: 151.

== Notable alumni and former editors ==
=== Academia ===
- Bruce Ackerman, Sterling Professor at Yale Law School and American constitutional law scholar (appears in Vol. 1:1)
- Monica Bell, Yale Law School professor (appears in Vol. 24:1)
- Aslı Ü. Bâli, Yale Law School professor (appears in Vol. 13.2)
- William Baude, Harry Kalven Jr. Professor of Law at the University of Chicago Law School (appears in Vol. 23.2)
- Owen Fiss, Yale Law professor (appears in Vol. 1:1)
- Jill Fisch, Professor of Business Law at the University of Pennsylvania Law School (appears in Vol. 2.2)
- Paul Gewirtz, Yale Law professor (appears in Vol. 1:1)
- Abbe Gluck, Yale Law professor and Special Counsel on President Biden's COVID-19 team (appears in Vol. 16:1)
- Zachary D. Kaufman, legal academic and social entrepreneur (Editor-in-Chief Vol. 27:1, 27:2)
- Cristina Rodriguez, co-Chair of the Presidential Commission on the Supreme Court of the United States and Yale Law professor (appears in Vol. 16:1)
- Benjamin Sachs, Professor of Labor and Industry at Harvard Law School
- Stephen E. Sachs, Antonin Scalia Professor of Law at Harvard Law School (appears in Vol. 24.1, 25.1, 26.1)
- Reva Siegel, Yale Law School professor

=== Business ===
- Joseph Tsai, co-founder and executive vice chairman of Chinese multinational technology company Alibaba Group (appears in Vol 5:1, 5.2, 6.1, 6.2, 7.1, 7.2).

=== Judiciary ===
- Ronnie Abrams, federal district judge of the Southern District of New York (appears in Vol. 10.1, 10.2)
- Roy Altman, federal district judge of the Southern District of Florida (appears in Vol. 23.2)
- David Barlow, federal district judge of the District of Utah (appears in Vol. 14.2, 15.1, 15.2)
- Jacqueline Becerra, federal district judge of the Southern District of Florida (appears in Vol. 11.2, 12.1)
- Steven Colloton, federal appeals judge of the 8th Circuit (appears in Vol. 4:2)
- John Cronan, federal district judge of the Southern District of New York (Editor-in-Chief Vol. 19.1, 19.2)
- Jesse Furman, federal district judge of the Southern District of New York
- Maame Ewusi-Mensah Frimpong, federal district judge of the Central District of California (appears in Vol. 17.1, 17.2, 18.2)
- Pamela Harris, federal appeals judge of the 4th Circuit (appears in Vol. 6.1, 6.2, 7.1, 7.2, 8.1, 8.2)
- Embry Kidd, federal appeals judge of the 11th Circuit (appears in Vol. 24.1)
- Leondra Kruger, Justice of the Supreme Court of California, former Principal Deputy Solicitor General. (appears in Vol. 17.1, 17.2)
- Goodwin Liu, Justice of the Supreme Court of California, former Berkeley Law professor and 9th Circuit nominee (appears in Vol. 13:2)
- Eunice C. Lee, federal appeals judge of the 2nd Circuit (appears in Vol. 13.1, 13.2)
- Anna M. Manasco, federal district judge of the Northern District of Alabama (appears in Vol. 24.1, 25.1, 26.1)
- Jeffrey A. Meyer, federal district judge of the District of Connecticut (appears in Vol 5.1, 5.2, 6.1, 6.2)
- Jill A. Pryor, federal appeals judge of the 11th Circuit (appears in Vol 5.2)

=== Media ===
- Emily Bazelon, journalist and staff writer for the New York Times Magazine (appears in Vol. 16:1)
- David Lat, founder and managing editor of the blog Above the Law
- Adam Liptak, current Supreme Court correspondent for the New York Times (appears in Vol. 4:2)
- Matt Levine, financial journalist & opinion columnist for Bloomberg News; author of Money Stuff newsletter. (appears in Vol 20.2, 21.1, 21.2, 22.1)
- Renato Mariotti, MSNBC legal correspondent, former federal prosecutor and candidate for Illinois Attorney General (appears in Vol. 17.1, 17.2, 18.1, 18.2)
- Daniel H. Pink, New York Times bestselling author of Drive and A Whole New Mind (Editor-in-Chief Vol 8:2, 9:1)
- Asha Rangappa, CNN/MSNBC legal correspondent, former FBI Agent and associate dean of Yale Law School (appears in Vol. 16.1, 16.2, 17.1, 17.2, 18.1, 18.2)

=== Politics & Government ===
- Wally Adeyamo, United States deputy secretary of the treasury (appears in Vol. 24:1)
- Michael Barr, Vice Chair of the Federal Reserve (appears in Vol 10.1)
- Hunter Biden, second son of President Joe Biden (appears in Vol. 14:2)
- Rob Bonta, Attorney General of California (appears in Vol. 13.2)
- Cornell William Brooks, former President of the NAACP
- Luke Bronin, 67th mayor of Hartford, CT and former general counsel to CT Gov. Dannel Malloy (Appears in Vol. 23.2)
- Jonathan Cedarbaum, deputy counsel to President Biden and legal adviser to the National Security Council (appears in Vol. 12:1, 13.1)
- Brian Deese, 13th Director of the National Economic Council, serving under President Joe Biden (appears in Vol. 24:1)
- Addisu Demissie, political strategist and campaign manager (appears in Vol. 25:1)
- Steven Engel, former Assistant Attorney General (appears in Vol. 16.1)
- Cyrus Habib, former Lieutenant Governor of Washington (appears in Vol 25.1)
- Joshua Hawley, United States Senator from Missouri (appears in Vol. 22:1)
- Dawn Johnsen, former Office of Legal Counsel employee, professor at Indiana University School of Law (appears in Vol. 2:1)
- Matt Klapper, former chief of staff to U.S. Senator Cory Booker and current chief of staff to Attorney General Merrick Garland.
- Joshua Steinglass, Assistant Manhattan District Attorney, Senior Trial Counsel on the Prosecution of Donald Trump in New York (appears in Vol. 13.2, 14.1, 14.2, 15.1)
- Jake Sullivan, National Security Advisor to President Joe Biden (appears in Vol. 19:1)
- Gene Sperling, Senior Advisor to President Joe Biden; director of the National Economic Council and assistant to the president for economic policy under Presidents Bill Clinton and Barack Obama (appears in Vol. 1:2)
- Neera Tanden, White House Staff Secretary and Senior Advisor to Joe Biden, former president of the Center for American Progress (appears in Vol. 14:1)
- David Uhlmann, Assistant Administrator of the EPA and former University of Michigan law professor (appears in Vol 5.1, 5.2)
- Damian Williams, United States Attorney for the Southern District of New York (appears in Vol. 23.2)
- Usha Vance, Second Lady of the United States (appears in Vol 29.2)
