= List of deans of Yale Law School =

Administrative head

Dean of Yale Law School
- Incumbent; Cristina M. Rodríguez since 2026
- Seat: Yale University
- Appointer: Yale Corporation
- Formation: 1873
- First holder: Francis Wayland III
- Website: Office of the Dean

Yale Law School is the law school of Yale University, a private research university in New Haven, Connecticut, United States. The school traces its origins to a proprietary law school that developed in the office of a New Haven lawyer in the early 19th century and gradually became affiliated with Yale during the 1820s. The dean of Yale Law School is the executive officer of the school and chairs meetings of both its faculty and its Board of Permanent Officers. The deanship has been endowed since 2004 by the Sol Goldman Charitable Trust and the Lillian Goldman Charitable Trust, and the sitting dean holds the title of Sol and Lillian Goldman Dean and Professor of Law.

Under the university's bylaws, the dean is appointed for a term of no more than five years by the Yale Corporation upon the recommendation of the university president, following consultation with the law school's Board of Permanent Officers. The board, which includes the dean together with the school's professors on permanent appointment and the president and provost ex officiis, is the governing board of the school and is entrusted with matters relating to its educational policy and governance. In addition to chairing meetings of the board and faculty, the dean presents an annual budget for the law school to the president or provost.

The office dates back to 1873, when Francis Wayland was appointed as the first dean of Yale Law School, two years after becoming its first full-time professor. Wayland served until 1903 and oversaw a period in which the school established a philanthropic base, organized its modern law library, founded the Yale Law Journal, and began developing graduate programs in law. In 1939, after the resignation of Charles Edward Clark, professor William O. Douglas was offered the deanship and accepted, only to be appointed a few days later by President Franklin D. Roosevelt to the U.S. Supreme Court. In 2017, Heather K. Gerken became the school's seventeenth dean and the first woman to hold the office. Following Gerken's departure in 2025, Yair Listokin served as interim dean from August 1, 2025, to January 30, 2026. Cristina M. Rodríguez assumed office on February 1, 2026, becoming Yale Law School's eighteenth dean.

== Deans ==
Deans
No.	Image	Name	Class	Term start	Term end	Ref.
1	Black and white portrait of Francis Wayland III.	Francis Wayland III	–	1873	1903	
2	Black and white portrait of Henry Wade Rogers wearing a suit.	Henry Wade Rogers	–	1903	1916	
3	Black and white portrait of Thomas Walter Swan wearing a suit and tie.	Thomas Walter Swan	–	1916	1927	
4	Black and white portrait of Robert Maynard Hutchins as a young man.	Robert Maynard Hutchins	1925	1927	1929	
5	Black and white portrait of Charles Edward Clark.	Charles Edward Clark	1913	1929	1939	
6		Ashbel Green Gulliver	1922	1940	1946	
7		Wesley Alba Sturges	1923	1946	1954	
8		Harry Shulman	–	1954	1955	
9	Black and white portrait of Eugene Rostow wearing a suit and tie.	Eugene V. Rostow	1937	1955	1965	
10	Photograph of Louis Pollak wearing a suit and tie.	Louis Heilprin Pollak	1948	1965	1970	
11		Abraham Samuel Goldstein	1949	1970	1975	
12		Harry Hillel Wellington	–	1975	1985	
13		Guido Calabresi	1958	1985	1994	
14		Anthony T. Kronman	1975	1994	2004	
15	Photograph of Harold Hongju Koh wearing a suit and tie.	Harold Hongju Koh	–	2004	2009	
16	Photograph of Robert Post.	Robert C. Post	1977	2009	2017	
17	Photograph of Heather Gerken speaking at a lectern.	Heather K. Gerken	–	July 1, 2017	July 31, 2025	
interim		Yair Listokin	2005	August 1, 2025	January 30, 2026	
18		Cristina M. Rodríguez	2000	February 1, 2026	present	

Wayland
Rogers
Swan
Hutchins
Clark
Gulliver
Sturges
Shulman
Rostow
Pollak
Goldstein
Wellington
Calabresi
Kronman
Koh
Post
Gerken
Listokin (interim)
Rodríguez
│
1870
│
1880
│
1890
│
1900
│
1910
│
1920
│
1930
│
1940
│
1950
│
1960
│
1970
│
1980
│
1990
│
2000
│
2010
│
2020
Deans of Yale Law School (1873–present)
