= Harry H. Wellington =

American scholar and writer (1926–2011)

Harry Hillel Wellington
- Born: August 13, 1926; New Haven, Connecticut, U.S.
- Died: August 8, 2011 (aged 84); New York City, New York, U.S.
- Education: University of Pennsylvania (BA); Harvard University (LLB)
- Occupation: Professor

Harry Hillel Wellington (August 13, 1926 – August 8, 2011) was an American legal scholar who served as the dean of Yale Law School from 1975 to 1985 and the dean of New York Law School from 1992 to 2000.

== Biography ==
Wellington was born in 1926. He received a B.A. from the University of Pennsylvania in 1947, and an LL.B. from Harvard Law School in 1952. He taught at Stanford Law School for a year. He clerked for the Circuit Court Judge Calvert Magruder. He also clerked for Associate Justice Felix Frankfurter from 1955 to 1956.

He was a member of American Academy of Arts & Sciences. He served as Senior Fellow of Brookings Institution, and on Board of Governors of Yale University Press. He was a scholar at Rockefeller Foundation in Bellagio, Italy. He was a recipient of Ford and Guggenheim Fellowships. He was on the board of directors of the New York Legal Assistance Group. In 1991, Wellington was elected to the Common Cause National Governing Board.

== Yale Law School ==
Wellington started teaching at Yale Law School in 1956 as an assistant professor. In his early years at Yale, he was a contracts scholar, focusing his scholarship on freedom of contract, organized labor, and collective bargaining. Wellington's best-known scholarly works are on legal process. He was made an associate professor in 1957, a full professor in 1960, and the Edward J. Phelps Professor of Law in 1967. He helped persuade John Simon to teach at Yale Law School in 1962.

He became the Dean of Yale Law School in 1975. He helped rebuild the faculty during his deanship, hiring over 30 professors, including Anthony T. Kronman, (Note: Anthony T. Kronman became Dean in 1994.) Barbara Black, Drew Days, Paul Gewirtz, George Priest, Stephen L. Carter, Lucinda Finley, and Oliver Williamson. He was an excellent fundraiser. Starting with his deanship, Yale Law School became, "the most theoretical and academically oriented law school in America." He became a Sterling Professor in 1983. As Dean, he developed the Yale Law School's loan forgiveness program. In 1985, he was succeeded as Dean by Guido Calabresi.

A professorial lecturership was established in his honor in 1995. He was a Sterling Professor of Law Emeritus and the Harry H. Wellington Professorial Lecturer. He was a Lifetime Honorary Member of the Yale Law School Executive Committee. In 2005, Yale Law School honored him by naming the Harry H. Wellington Dean's Discretionary Fund for Faculty Support after him.

== New York Law School Dean ==
In 1992, he retired from the Yale Law School faculty and became the 14th Dean of New York Law School. Under his deanship, the curriculum was revised to put greater emphasis on the practical skills of a professional attorney. Also, the Ernst C. Stiefel Professorship of Comparative Law was created. He was a John Marshall Harlan Visiting Professor at New York Law School. He retired from teaching in 2007.

== Selected works ==
- Contracts and Contract Remedies with Harold Shepherd, 1957
- Legislative Purpose and the Judicial Process: The Lincoln Mills Case, with Alexander Bickel, 1957
- The role of law in the prevention and settlement of major labor disputes and in the terms of settlement: A preliminary report, 1965
- Labour and the Legal Process, 1968
- The limits of collective bargaining in public employment, 1969
- The Unions and the Cities (Studies of unionism in government), with Ralph K. Winter, 1972
- The nature of judicial review (The Cardozo lecture), 1981
- Labor Law with Clyde W. Summers and Alan Hyde, 1983
- The Least Dangerous Branch: Supreme Court at the Bar of Politics, with Alexander Bickel, 1986
- Interpreting the Constitution: The Supreme Court and the Process of Adjudication, 1990

== See also ==
- List of law clerks for the second seat of the Supreme Court of the United States

== Notes ==
Academic offices
Preceded by Abraham Samuel Goldstein	Dean of Yale Law School; 1975–1985	Succeeded by Guido Calabresi
Preceded by James F. Simon	Dean of New York Law School; 1992–2000	Succeeded by Richard A. Matasar
