= Heather Gerken =

American legal scholar

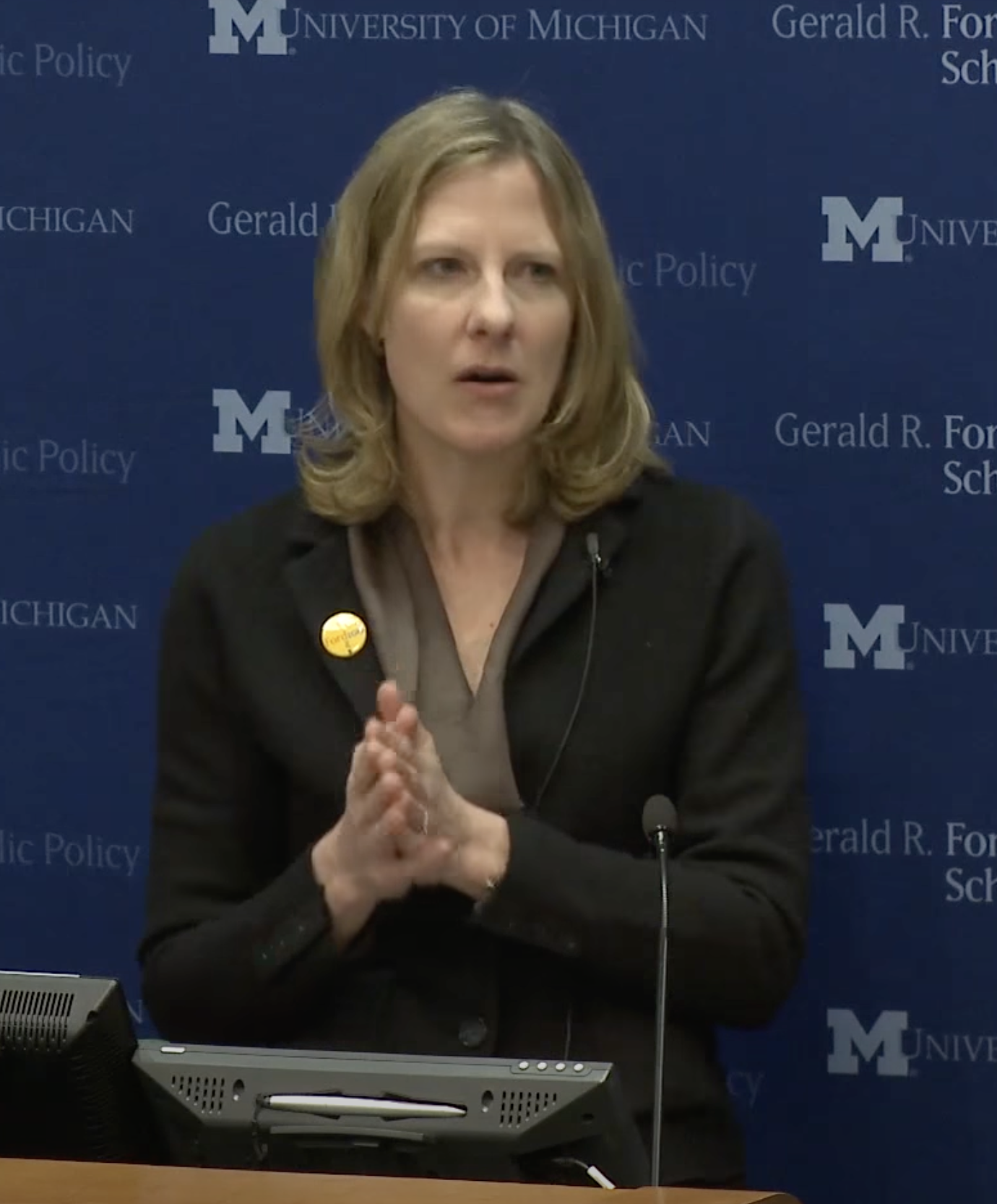
- Gerken in 2014

17th Dean of Yale Law School
- In office 2017–2025
- President: Peter Salovey; Maurie D. McInnis
- Preceded by: Robert C. Post
- Succeeded by: Yair Listokin (acting)

Personal details
- Born: Heather Kristin Gerken; February 19, 1969 (age 57) Bolton, Massachusetts, U.S.
- Spouse: David Simon
- Education: Princeton University (BA); University of Michigan (JD)

Heather Kristin Gerken (born February 19, 1969) is an American legal scholar. She has been the president of the Ford Foundation since November 2025. She was the 17th dean of Yale Law School from 2017 to 2025.

== Early life and education ==
Gerken grew up in Bolton, Massachusetts. She was educated at Nashoba Regional High School, graduated in 1987, and received a Presidential Scholarship.

In 1991, Gerken graduated summa cum laude from Princeton University with a Bachelor of Arts in history after completing a 123-page long senior thesis titled "Stepping Out of the Bounds of Womanhood: An Analysis of the Popular Image of Women and Women's Experiences during World War II". She was the recipient of the university's Dodds Prize, given to top seniors, and the Kenneth C. Harris Award for research.

After college, Gerken enrolled in the University of Michigan Law School on a full-tuition scholarship. She graduated in 1994 with a Juris Doctor, summa cum laude, and membership in the Order of the Coif. She was editor-in-chief of the Michigan Law Review and was named the commencement speaker of her class.

Gerken was a law clerk for Judge Stephen Reinhardt of the U.S. Court of Appeals for the Ninth Circuit from 1994–1995, and then for Justice David Souter at the U.S. Supreme Court from 1995–1996.

== Career ==
She was an associate at Jenner & Block in Washington, D.C., from December 1996 to July 2000. From July 2000 to June 2006, she was a professor at Harvard Law School, where she was also a fellow at the Harvard University Center for Ethics and the Profession from September 2003 to July 2004. In 2006 Gerken joined Yale Law School and in 2008 she became the inaugural J. Skelly Wright Professor of Law.

In 2009, in her book The Democracy Index (Princeton University Press), she proposed an index that would rate and compare the performance of elections systems at the state and local levels, to evaluate and improve the U.S. elections system. She became dean of Yale Law School in 2017, and in the same year she was elected a Fellow of the American Academy of Arts and Sciences. In 2021, she was named to the Presidential Commission on the Supreme Court of the United States, created by President Joe Biden in order to "provide an analysis of the principal arguments in the contemporary public debate for and against Supreme Court reform" in the context of evaluating the history and future of the court and its practices.

In January 2022, Yale University President Peter Salovey announced that Gerken had been reappointed as dean of Yale Law School for a second five-year term. While at Yale Law, she also served as the Sol & Lillian Goldman Professor of Law.

In August 2025, Gerken stepped down from her role as dean to become president of the Ford Foundation.

== Personal life ==
Gerken is the great-granddaughter of Sir Ernest Bland Royden.

Gerken is married to David Simon.

== Bibliography ==
- The Democracy Index: Why Our Election System is Failing and How to Fix It (Princeton University Press 2009) ISBN 9780691154374
- "Slipping the Bonds of Federalism", 128 Harvard Law Review 85 (2014)
- "The Political Safeguards of Horizontal Federalism", 113 Michigan Law Review 57 (2014) (with Ari Holtzblatt)
- "The Real Problem with Citizens United: Campaign Finance, Dark Money, and Shadow Parties", 97 Marquette Law Review 904 (2014)
- "Uncooperative Federalism", 118 Yale Law Journal 1256 (2009) (with Jessica Bulman-Pozen)

== See also ==
- List of law clerks for the third seat of the Supreme Court of the United States

Academic offices
Preceded by Robert Post	Dean of Yale Law School; 2017–2025	Succeeded by Yair Listokin; Acting
