= Harry Shulman =

American law professor (1903–1955)

Harry A. Shulman

8th Dean of Yale Law School
- In office 1954–1955
- Preceded by: Wesley Alba Sturges
- Succeeded by: Eugene V. Rostow

Personal details
- Born: May 14, 1903 Krugloye near Mogilev, Russian Empire
- Died: March 20, 1955 (aged 51) Hamden, Connecticut, U.S.
- Education: Brown University (BA); Harvard University (LLB, SJD)

Harry A. Shulman (May 14, 1903 – March 20, 1955) was a professor at Yale Law School from 1930 to 1954, the dean of Yale Law School from 1954–1955, an expert of industrial relations and labor law, and a prominent labor arbitrator.

== Early life ==
Shulman was born in Krugloye near Mogilev (now in Belarus), in the Russian Empire in 1903. His parents were Simon Shulman and Tillie Klebanoff. He emigrated to the United States in 1912. His family moved to Providence, Rhode Island. He earned his B.A. from Brown University in 1923 after only three years of study. He then earned an LL.B. and S.J.D. from Harvard Law School in 1926 and 1927, respectively. He received an honorary Doctor of Laws degree from Brown University on June 1, 1953. He practiced law for a year in New York City before clerking for Justice Louis Dembitz Brandeis from 1929 to 1930.

== Yale Law School ==
In 1930, became an instructor at Yale Law School. In 1931, he was made an assistant professor of law. His son, Stephen N. Shulman, was born in 1933. He became an associate professor in 1933, and a professor in 1937. He became a Lines Professor in 1939, and a Sterling Professor in 1940. He was described as a superb teacher.

His scholarly work concerned torts, administrative law scholarship, and labor contracts. His lecture, "Reason, Contract, and Law in Labor Relations", has been cited hundreds of times.

In 1941, he completed his work on the Attorney General's Committee on Administrative Procedure, which was "among the factors guiding the modern evolution of administrative law.

He was named as the next Dean of Yale Law School on January 12, 1954. On July 1, 1954, he became Dean of Yale Law School. He died in 1955 from cancer. A scholarship fund was established in his honor in 1955, a research fund in 1957, and a library fund in 1963. Conferences on labor relations were held at Yale Law School in his honor on April 6–7, 1956 and January 10–11, 1958.

== Work as arbitrator ==
Shulman was "one of the most influential people in the history of American Labor arbitration." His "greatest accomplishment", according to Eugene V. Rostow, was "the establishment of regular procedures for peacefully enforcing the provisions of labor contracts."

He was known as an arbitrator of even temperament, common sense, good humor, and exceptional judgment. He was a temporary board member of the National Recovery Administration. He was an associate member of the National War Labor Board during World War II. He also served on the Connecticut Labor Relations Board and the Alien Enemy Hearing Board of Connecticut. He was a special counsel for the Railroad Retirement Board from 1934 to 1936, and assisted in the arguing of Railroad Retirement Board v. Alton Railroad Co. before the Supreme Court.

He led a panel on steel workers wages during the 1952 steel strike. He also helped arbitrate an aircraft industry workers' collective bargaining case in 1952, which resulted in a 14 cent an hour wage increase. He was a member of the Wage Stabilization Board during the Korean War. Many of the cases that Shulman handled involved violence.

He was a member of the Attorney General's committee on administrative procedure in 1940 and 1941. As a reporter for the American Law Institute on the restatement of torts, he dealt with unfair competition, trademark infringements and labor disputes. He was a member of the council of the American Law Institute from 1947 to 1952. In May 1954, he received the Americanism Award of the Connecticut Valley Council of B'nai B'rith.

== Selected works ==
- Cases and materials on the law of torts with Fleming James Jr., 1942
- Cases on labor relations with Neil W. Chamberlain, 1949
- A study of law administration in Connecticut : a report of an investigation of the activities of certain trial courts of the state with Charles Edward Clark, 1937
- Opinions of the Umpire, 1945
- Cases on Federal Jurisdictions and Procedure with Felix Frankfurter, 1937

== See also ==
- List of law clerks for the fourth seat of the Supreme Court of the United States

Academic offices
| Preceded by Wesley Alba Sturges | Dean of Yale Law School; 1954–1955 | Succeeded by Eugene Victor Rostow |
