= Leora Bilsky =

Israeli legal scholar

- ליאורה בילסקי
- Born: 1967 (age 58–59); Israel

Academic background
- Education: LL.B, The Hebrew University of Jerusalem; LLM., J.S.D., Yale University Law School
- Thesis: The Narrative Turn in Legal Scholarship
- Doctoral advisor: Anthony T. Kronman
- Website: leorabilsky.sites.tau.ac.il

Leora Y. Bilsky (Hebrew: ליאורה בילסקי; born in 1967) is an Israeli full professor at the Faculty of Law, and the Director of the Minerva Center for Human Rights, both at Tel Aviv University.

== Education ==
In 1991, she was a law clerk for Honorable Justice Aharon Barak of the Supreme Court of Israel. She passed the Israel Bar Association in 1992 and subsequently joined the Association for Civil Rights in Israel and Association for Israeli Studies.

In 1995, after being granted a Fulbright scholarship, Bilsky completed her JSD degree at Yale University.

== Career ==
In 1996, Bilsky joined the Tel Aviv University faculty of Law as a Lecturer. During the 1998–1999 academic year, Bilsky was a Faculty Fellow at Harvard University. Upon her return, she was promoted to Associate Professor in 2003 and accepted a visiting faculty position at the University of Toronto. In 2004, Bilsky published Transformative Justice: Israeli Identity on Trial. She later sat on the Van Leer Jerusalem Institute Theory and Criticism journal Editorial Board from 2010 until 2012. Before leaving the board, Bilsky received a research grant and was promoted to Full Professor in 2012. In 2013, she was awarded the Zeltner Award for Excellence in Legal Research. That same year, she also became the Director of the Minerva Center for Human Rights at Tel Aviv University.

During the 2015–16 academic year, Bilsky was the William and Patricia Kleh Visiting Professor in International Law at Boston University. In 2017, she published The Holocaust, Corporations, and the Law: Unfinished Business through the University of Michigan Press.

== Publications ==
The following is a list of publications:

- Territory, community and political trials
- Transformative Justice: Israeli Identity on Trial (2004)
- Political trials
- Giving voice to women: a feminist reading of an Israeli case study
- The Holocaust, Corporations, and the Law: Unfinished Business (2017)
