= Eugene V. Rostow =

American legal scholar and public servant (1913–1989)

Eugene Rostow
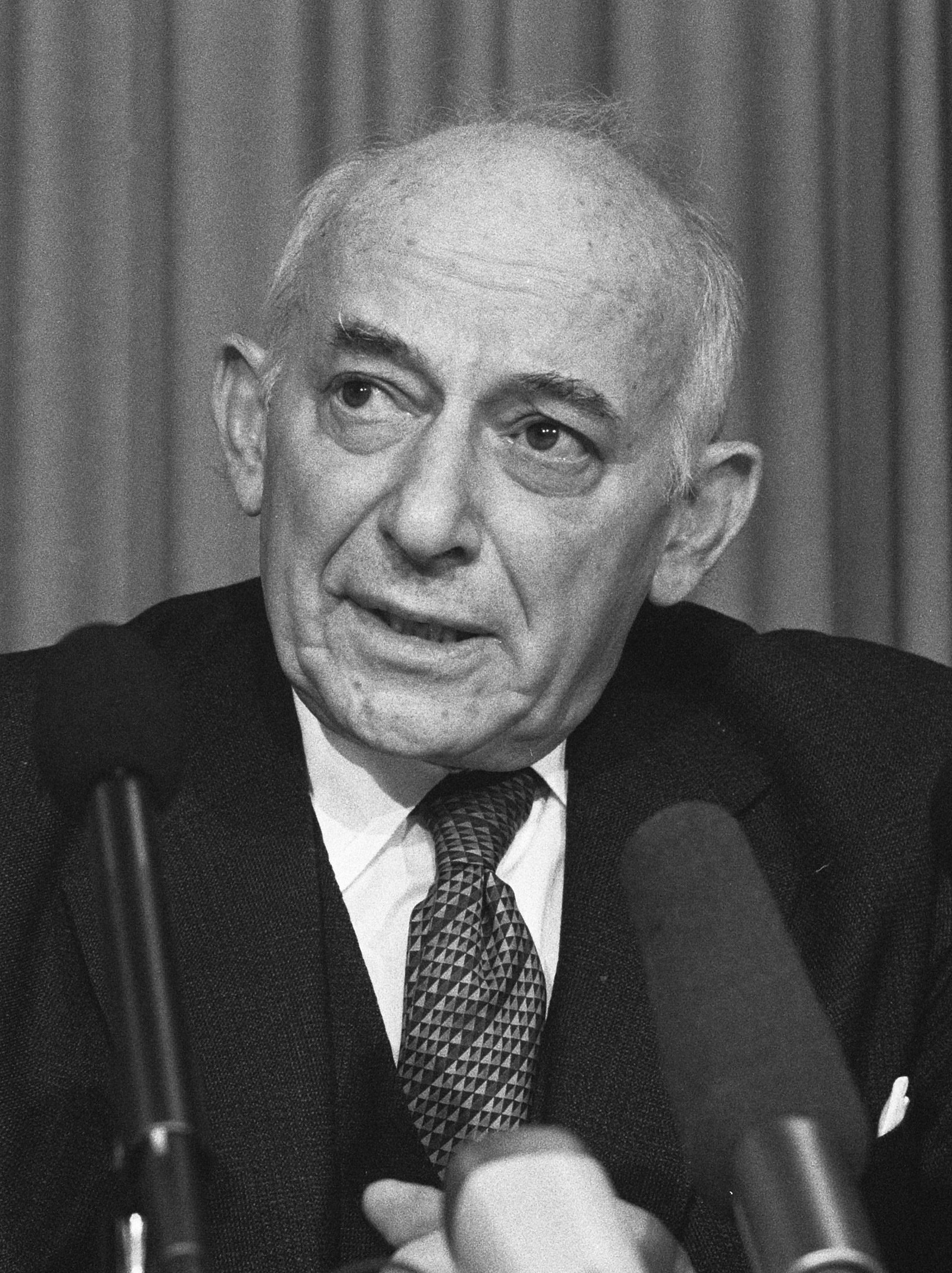
- Rostow in 1981

7th Director of the Arms Control and Disarmament Agency
- In office June 30, 1981 – January 12, 1983
- President: Ronald Reagan
- Preceded by: Ralph Earle
- Succeeded by: James L. George (acting)

5th Under Secretary of State for Political Affairs
- In office October 14, 1966 – January 20, 1969
- President: Lyndon B. Johnson
- Preceded by: W. Averell Harriman
- Succeeded by: U. Alexis Johnson

9th Dean of Yale Law School
- In office 1955–1965
- Preceded by: Harry Shulman
- Succeeded by: Louis H. Pollak

Personal details
- Born: Eugene Victor Debs Rostow; August 25, 1913 New York City, New York, U.S.
- Died: November 25, 2002 (aged 89) Alexandria, Virginia, U.S.
- Party: Democratic
- Spouse: Edna Greenberg (m. 1933)
- Education: Yale University (BA, LLB); King's College, Cambridge (attended)

Eugene Victor Debs Rostow (August 25, 1913 – November 25, 2002) was an American legal scholar and civil servant. He was appointed dean of Yale Law School and served as Under Secretary of State for Political Affairs under U.S. President Lyndon B. Johnson. During the 1970s, Rostow was a leader of the movement against détente with the Soviet Union, and in 1981, U.S. President Ronald Reagan appointed him director of the Arms Control and Disarmament Agency (ACDA).

== Early life ==
Rostow was born in Brooklyn, New York, to a family of Russian-Jewish émigrés from the Russian Empire. He was raised in Irvington, New Jersey and New Haven, Connecticut. His parents were active socialists and their three sons, Eugene, Ralph, and Walt, were named after Eugene V. Debs, Ralph Waldo Emerson, and Walt Whitman.

== Education ==
Rostow attended New Haven High School and was admitted to Yale College in 1929. At the time, his scores on his entrance examinations were so high that The New York Times called him the first "perfect freshman". In 1931 he joined the Phi Beta Kappa, and in 1933 he earned his B.A., graduating with highest honors, and receiving the Alpheus Henry Snow Prize. Subsequently, he became a member of Alpha Delta Phi.

From 1933 to 1934, Rostow studied economics at King's College, Cambridge, (where he would return years later as a professor) as a Henry Fellow. He then returned to Yale, attending Yale Law School, and earning his LL.B. with highest honors. From 1936 to 1937, he served as editor-in-chief of the Yale Law Journal. Rostow defined himself as a "New England Puritan Jew".

== Career ==
After graduation, Rostow worked at the New York law firm of Cravath, deGersdorff, Swaine and Wood, specializing in bankruptcy, corporations, and antitrust.

In 1938 he returned to Yale Law School as a faculty member (becoming a full professor in 1944), and became a member of the Yale Economics Department as well. Leon Lipson says, "Throughout his career, he has woven ideas or beliefs about American constitutional bases and practices with others about international diplomacy, politics, and force. The linking threads are morality and law."

During World War II, Rostow served in the Office of Lend-Lease Administration as an assistant general counsel, in the State Department as liaison to the Lend-Lease Administration, and as an assistant to then–Assistant Secretary of State for Legislative Affairs Dean Acheson. He was an early and vocal critic of Japanese American internment and the Supreme Court decisions which supported it; in 1945, he wrote an influential paper published in the Yale Law Journal, which helped fuel the movement for restitution. In that paper he wrote: "We believe that the German people bear a common political responsibility for outrages secretly committed by the Gestapo and the SS. What are we to think of our own part in a program which violates every democratic social value, yet has been approved by the Congress, the President, and the Supreme Court?"

=== Dean of Yale Law School ===
In 1955, Rostow succeeded his professor Harry Shulman as dean of Yale Law School, a post he held until 1965. Towards the end of his tenure, he was appointed Sterling Professor of Law and Public Affairs. In 1959, he was appointed Pitt Professor of American History and Institutions at the University of Cambridge. At one point in 1962 he was considered by U.S. President John F. Kennedy for appointment to the Supreme Court but geographical and religious issues interfered.

Rostow coined the term "ceremonial deism" in 1962, and has been used since 1984 by the Supreme Court to assess exemptions from the Establishment Clause of the First Amendment to the U.S. Constitution, thought to be expressions of cultural tradition and not earnest invocations of a deity. However, American academic and professor of philosophy Martha Nussbaum remarks that the term does not describe any school of thought within Deism itself.

From 1966 to 1969, he served as Under Secretary for Political Affairs in Lyndon B. Johnson's government, the third-highest-ranking official in the State Department. During this time he helped draft UN Security Council Resolution 242, one of the most important Security Council resolutions relevant to the Arab–Israeli conflict.

After leaving government service, Rostow returned to teach at Yale Law School, teaching courses in constitutional, international, and antitrust law. In 1984, Rostow was appointed Sterling Professor of Law and Public Affairs Emeritus at Yale University.

== Foreign policy ==
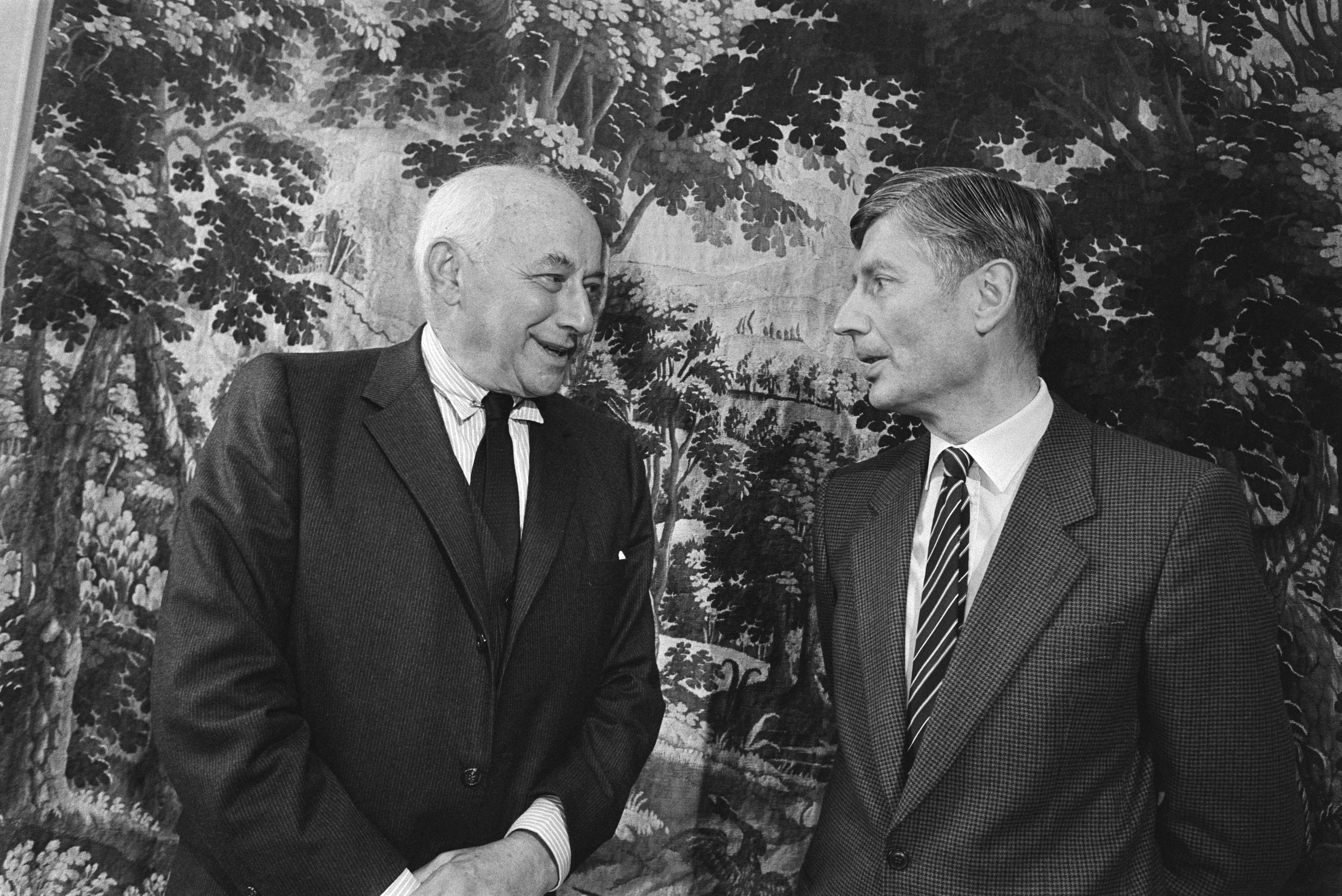
Rostow with Dutch prime minister Dries van Agt

Rostow spent much of the 1970s in warning that détente with the Soviet Union was a dangerous fiction, downplayed Soviet military expansionism, and enabled a "Soviet drive for dominance" in the world.

Kathleen Christison writes that Rostow's perspective on the Arab–Israeli conflict was quite pro-Israeli, and he generally failed to acknowledge the existence of Palestinians. For example, Rostow delivered an entire symposium in 1976 on the British Mandate of Palestine and the 1948 Arab–Israeli War without a single mention of the Palestinian people and their exodus.

Rostow was a leader of the Coalition for a Democratic Majority and helped found and lead the Committee on the Present Danger. In 1981, U.S. President Ronald Reagan appointed him director of the Arms Control and Disarmament Agency (ACDA), which made Rostow the highest-ranking Democrat in the Reagan Administration; he was removed from office in 1993. At his confirmation hearing during the same year, U.S. Senator Claiborne Pell asked Rostow if he thought the United States could survive a nuclear war. Rostow replied that Japan "not only survived but flourished after the nuclear attack." When questioners pointed out that the Soviet Union would attack with thousands of nuclear warheads, rather than two, Rostow replied: "the human race is very resilient. [...] Depending upon certain assumptions, some estimates predict that there would be ten million casualties on one side and one hundred million on another. But that is not the whole of the population."

In 1990, regarding the legal principles of the Geneva Convention/Oslo Accords and the establishment of a peace agreement between Israel and Palestine, Rostow declared: "The Convention prohibits many of the inhumane practices of the Nazis and the Soviet Union during and before the Second World War—the mass transfer of people into and out of occupied territories for purposes of extermination, slave labor or colonization, for example. [...] The Jewish settlers in the West Bank are most emphatically volunteers. They have not been 'deported' or 'transferred' to the area by the Government of Israel, and their movement involves none of the atrocious purposes or harmful effects on the existing population it is the goal of the Geneva Convention to prevent."

== Personal life ==
In 1933, Rostow married Edna Greenberg, and they remained married until his death on November 25, 2002, from congestive heart failure, in Alexandria, Virginia. Together they had three children, Victor, Jessica, and Nicholas, along with 6 grandchildren and 3 great grandchildren. His younger brother, Walt Whitman Rostow, served as national security adviser to U.S. Presidents John F. Kennedy and Lyndon B. Johnson.

== Selected publications ==
- "The Japanese American Cases: A Disaster", 54 Yale Law Journal 489 (1945).
- A National Policy for the Oil Industry (1948)
- "The democratic character of judicial review." Harvard Law Review 66.2 (1952): 193–224.
- Planning for Freedom (1959)
- The Sovereign Prerogative (1962)
- Law, Power, and the Pursuit of Peace (1968)
- Is Law Dead? (ed., 1971)
- "Great Cases Make Bad Law: The War Powers Act." Texas Law Review 50 (1971): 833+
- The Ideal in Law (1978)
- A Breakfast for Bonaparte US national security interests from the Heights of Abraham to the Nuclear age (1993), (Published as "Towards Managed Peace" under Yale University Press)

Academic offices
Preceded by Harry Shulman	Dean of Yale Law School; 1955–1965	Succeeded by Louis H. Pollak
Political offices
Preceded by W. Averell Harriman	Under Secretary of State for Political Affairs; 1966–1969	Succeeded by U. Alexis Johnson
Diplomatic posts
Preceded by Ralph Earle	Director of the Arms Control and Disarmament Agency; 1981–1983	Succeeded by James L. George; Acting
