= Ashbel Green Gulliver =

American legal academic (1897–1974)

- Born: November 23, 1897; Connecticut, U.S.
- Died: July 3, 1974 (aged 76); Hanover, New Hampshire, U.S.
- Education: Yale University (BA, LLB)
- Known for: Former dean of Yale Law School
- Spouse: Eugenia B. Porter Gulliver

Ashbel Green Gulliver (November 23, 1897 – July 3, 1974) was the dean of Yale Law School from 1940 to 1946. His nickname was "Pail"—from ashpail.

== Early life and education ==
Gulliver went to Groton School for high school. He received a B.A. from Yale University in 1919, where he was secretary of the Elizabethan Club and a member of the Wolf's Head secret society.

Gulliver graduated with an LL.B. from Yale Law School in 1922. He was the class valedictorian. While at Yale Law School, he was on the Yale Law Journal and served as its secretary.

== Career ==
After graduating, he worked at Alexander & Green, which was founded by Ashbel Green, his grandfather.

Gulliver became an assistant professor at Yale Law School in 1927, and a full professor in 1935. In 1934, he became assistant dean of Yale Law School. In 1939, when Charles Edward Clark resigned as dean to become a judge on the United States Court of Appeals for the Second Circuit, he was appointed acting dean. He became dean in 1940, and held that position until 1946. During World War II, he recommended that other law schools merge or close. While dean, in 1941, he wrote his classic article on trust law, "Classification of Gratuitous Transfers", with Catherine J. Tilson.

During World War II, Gulliver was the chairman of the Alien Hearing Board for Connecticut. After the war, he was a member of the Connecticut Post-War Planning Board and chairman of the Yale University Post-War Planning Committee, and he worked for the Office of the Pardon Attorney.

After his deanship, he continued to teach, and by 1967, had become the Garver Professor of Law Emeritus at Yale Law School. In general, Gulliver was considered a solid, enterprising, and uncontroversial administrator, and a "mild-mannered man."

The Ashbel G. Gulliver Memorial Library Fund at Yale Law School is endowed in his name.

== Work as arbitrator ==
Gulliver was a chairman of the Connecticut State Board of Labor Relations.

== Selected works ==
- Cases and Other Materials On the Law of Estates, 1932
- Classification of Gratuitous Transfers with Catherine J. Tilson, 1941
- Cases and Materials On the Law of Future Interests, 1959
- Cases and Materials On Decedents' Estates, 1966
- Cases and Materials On Gratuitous Transfers: Wills, Intestate Succession, Trusts, Gifts, and Future Interests, 1967

Academic offices
Preceded by Charles Edward Clark	Dean of Yale Law School; 1940 – 1946	Succeeded by Wesley Alba Sturges
