= Anthony T. Kronman =

Law professor at Yale Law School

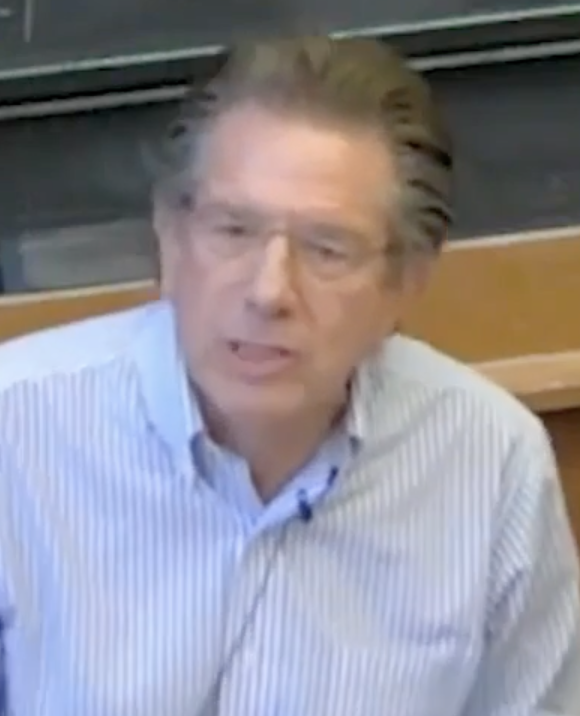
- Kronman in 2022

14th Dean of Yale Law School
- In office 1994–2004
- Preceded by: Guido Calabresi
- Succeeded by: Harold Hongju Koh

Personal details
- Born: May 12, 1945 (age 81) Los Angeles, California, U.S.
- Parent: Rosella Towne (mother)
- Education: Williams College (BA); Yale University (PhD, JD)
- Awards: American Academy of Arts & Sciences (1994)

Academic work
- Discipline: Contract law
- Doctoral students: Leora Bilsky

Anthony Townsend Kronman (born May 12, 1945) is an American legal scholar who serves as a Sterling Professor at Yale Law School specializing in contracts, bankruptcy, jurisprudence, social theory, and professional responsibility. He was the 14th dean of Yale Law School from 1994 to 2004.

== Early life and education ==
Kronman was raised in Los Angeles, California, the son of Harry Kronman, a Hollywood screenwriter, and actress Rosella Towne. Kronman received a Bachelor of Arts, magna cum laude, from Williams College in 1968 and was elected to Phi Beta Kappa. He then received a Ph.D. in philosophy from Yale University in 1972, and a Juris Doctor from Yale Law School in 1975. He was an editor of the Yale Law Journal while a law student at Yale.

== Career ==
He taught at the University of Minnesota Law School from 1975 to 1976, and the University of Chicago Law School from 1976 to 1978, before joining the Yale faculty. In addition to the courses that Kronman teaches at Yale Law School, he also teaches undergraduate classes in literature, philosophy, and history and politics as part of the Directed Studies program at Yale. Outside of his academic obligations, Kronman is of counsel at the law firm of Boies, Schiller & Flexner.

== Views on diversity ==
Kronman has characterized contemporary diversity campaigns as political rather than educational. In his 2019 book Assault on American Excellence, he criticized Yale's decisions to change the title of "master" to "head of college" and to rename "Calhoun College". He rebuked University President Peter Salovey's lack of support for the Christakises, who were targeted by students during a 2015 protest over inclusivity and free discourse. Other members of the university community disagreed with Kronman's positions.

== Bibliography ==
- Education's End: Why Our Colleges and Universities Have Given Up on the Meaning of Life. Yale University Press. 2007. ISBN 978-0300122886.
- Confessions of a Born-Again Pagan. Yale University Press. 2016. ISBN 978-0300208535.
- The Assault on American Excellence. Free Press. 2019. ISBN 978-1501199486.
- True Conservatism: Reclaiming Our Humanity in an Arrogant Age. Yale University Press. 2025. ISBN 978-0300277036.

Academic offices
Preceded by Guido Calabresi	Dean of Yale Law School; 1994–2004	Succeeded by Harold Hongju Koh
