= Justin Driver =

American legal scholar

Presidential Commission on the Supreme Court of the United States
- President: Joe Biden
- Preceded by: Position established
- Succeeded by: Position abolished

Personal details
- Education: Brown University (BA); Duke University (MA); Magdalen College, Oxford (MSt); Harvard University (JD)

Justin Driver is an American legal scholar. He is the Robert R. Slaughter Professor of Law and counselor to the dean at Yale Law School, where he has taught since 2019. Prior to joining the faculty at Yale, Driver taught at the University of Chicago Law School, where he was the Harry N. Wyatt Professor of Law.

He is an elected member of the American Academy of Arts and Sciences and the American Law Institute. In 2021, Driver was appointed by President Joe Biden to serve on the Presidential Commission on the Supreme Court of the United States. In 2024, Driver was appointed to serve on the U.S. Permanent Committee for the Oliver Wendell Holmes Devise.

== Early life and education ==
Justin Driver was raised in a predominantly black neighborhood in Southeast Washington, D.C. As a child, he commuted across the city, to attend Alice Deal Middle School in the more affluent Chevy Chase neighborhood.

Driver earned his B.A. degree with honors in public policy from Brown University in 1997. He subsequently earned an M.A. in teaching from Duke University in 1998, an M.St. in modern history from Magdalen College, Oxford, in 2000, and a Juris Doctor from Harvard Law School in 2004, where he was an editor of the Harvard Law Review. Driver served as a law clerk to Judge Merrick Garland on the United States Court of Appeals for the District of Columbia Circuit, and Justice Sandra Day O'Connor and Justice Stephen Breyer on the Supreme Court of the United States.

== Career ==
Driver joined the University of Texas School of Law in 2009. He became the Harry N. Wyatt Professor of Law at the University of Chicago in 2014. Driver was a member of the American Law Institute and of the American Constitution Society’s Academic Advisory Board. Driver was an editor of The Supreme Court Review. On April 9, 2021, Driver was named to the Presidential Commission on the Supreme Court of the United States.

On May 26, 2022, it was reported that Driver and colleague Cristina M. Rodríguez were possibly being vetted for a vacancy on the United States Court of Appeals for the Second Circuit, but he expressed no interest in that position.

== Recognition ==
- Elected Member, American Academy of Arts and Sciences, 2022
- Steven S. Goldberg Award for Distinguished Scholarship in Education Law, Education Law Association, 2020
- Elected Member, American Law Institute, 2017
- William Nelson Cromwell Article Prize, American Society for Legal History, 2013

== Selected publications ==
- The Schoolhouse Gate: Public Education, the Supreme Court, and the Battle for the American Mind (2018)

== See also ==
- List of law clerks for the second seat of the Supreme Court of the United States
