= Robert Post (law professor) =

American legal scholar (born 1947)

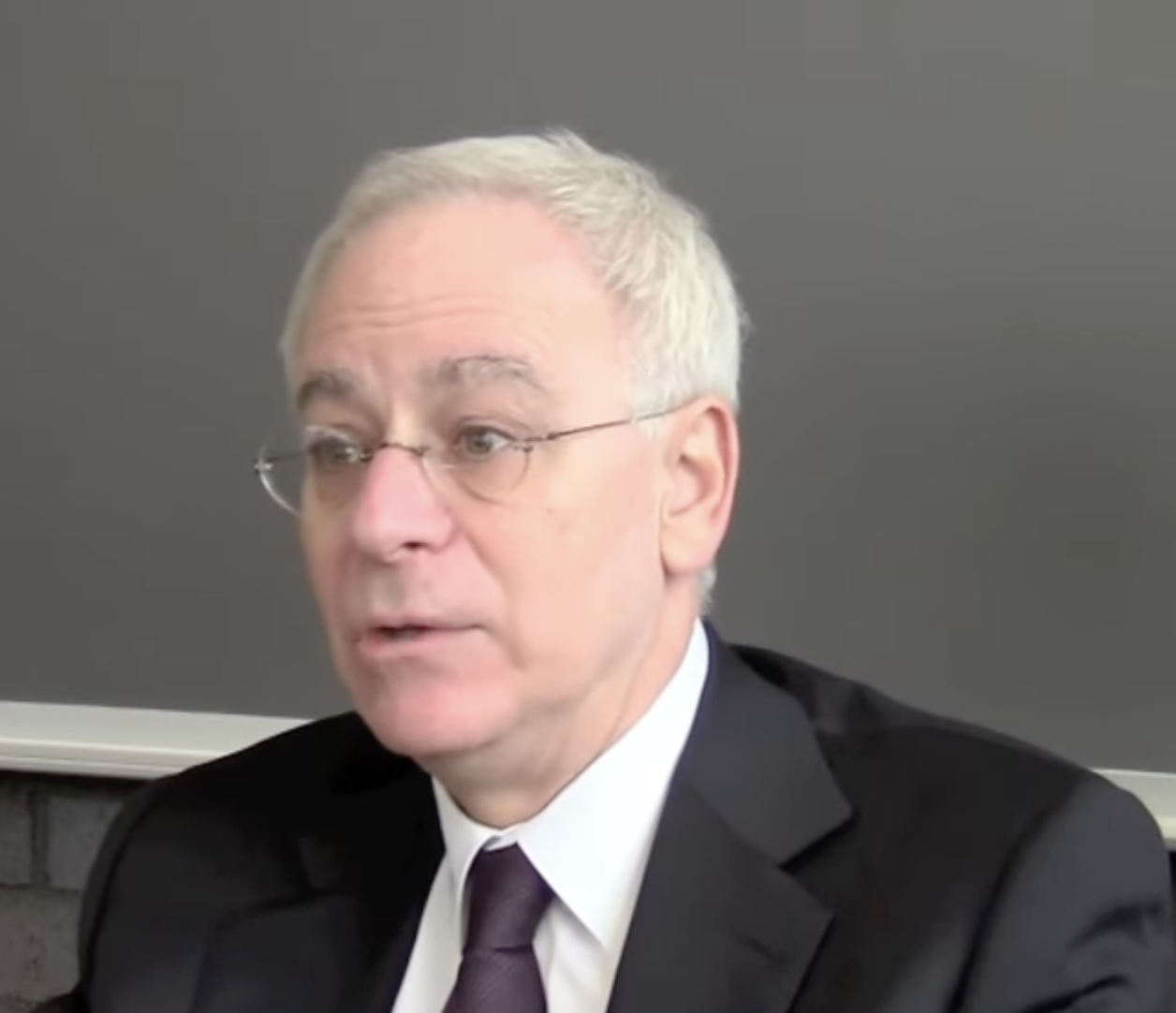
- Post in 2012

16th Dean of Yale Law School
- In office 2009–2017
- Preceded by: Harold Hongju Koh
- Succeeded by: Heather K. Gerken

Personal details
- Born: Robert Charles Post; October 17, 1947 (age 78) New York City, U.S.
- Relations: Ted Post (father)
- Education: Harvard University (BA, PhD); Yale University (JD)

Robert Charles Post (born October 17, 1947) is an American legal scholar who is currently a professor of law at Yale Law School. He was the dean of Yale Law School from 2009 to 2017. Post has been quoted in the New York Times on the composition of the Supreme Court. He was elected to the American Philosophical Society in 2011. Post's academic interests include constitutional law, First Amendment, legal history, and affirmative action. His book entitled, Citizens Divided (2014), looks at the constitutional aspects of electoral campaign finance.

== Biography ==
Post received his Bachelor of Arts from Harvard University in 1969 and earned his Juris Doctor from Yale Law School in 1977. While at Yale, he served as an editor of the Yale Law Journal. After law school, Post was a law clerk for D.C. Circuit Judge David L. Bazelon and Supreme Court Justice William J. Brennan, Jr.

Post subsequently earned a Ph.D. in History of American Civilization from Harvard University. He then worked briefly in private practice of law.

Post began teaching law at Berkeley School of Law at University of California in 1983. Post moved from Berkeley Law to Yale Law School in 2003. He succeeded Harold Koh as dean of the law school when Koh was appointed to serve as Legal Adviser to the U.S. State Department.

Robert Post is married to legal scholar Reva Siegel.

== See also ==
- List of law clerks for the third seat of the Supreme Court of the United States

Academic offices
Preceded by Kate Stith (acting)	Dean of Yale Law School; 2009–2017	Succeeded by Heather K. Gerken
