= Cristina M. Rodríguez =

American legal scholar (born 1973)

Cristina Rodríguez

18th Dean of Yale Law School
- Incumbent
- Assumed office February 1, 2026
- President: Maurie D. McInnis
- Preceded by: Yair Listokin (acting)

Co-Chair of the Presidential Commission on the Supreme Court of the United States
- In office April 9, 2021 – December 7, 2021 Serving with Robert Bauer
- President: Joe Biden
- Preceded by: Position established
- Succeeded by: Position abolished

Personal details
- Born: February 3, 1973 (age 53) San Antonio, Texas, U.S.
- Education: Yale University (BA, JD); St John's College, Oxford (MLitt)

Cristina María Rodríguez (born February 3, 1973) is an American legal scholar who has been the 18th dean of Yale Law School since 2026. She is the first tenured Hispanic professor at Yale Law School.

Before joining the faculty at Yale, Rodríguez was the deputy assistant attorney general for the Office of Legal Counsel at the U.S. Department of Justice. In 2025, she was announced as the 18th dean of Yale Law School, a role she assumed on February 1, 2026.

== Early life and education ==
Rodríguez was born on February 3, 1973, in San Antonio, Texas. Rodríguez's father is from Cuba and her mother is from Puerto Rico.

After high school, Rodríguez received a B.A. in history from Yale College. She then obtained an M.Litt. in modern history at the University of Oxford as a Rhodes Scholar and received a J.D. from Yale Law School, where she was articles editor of the Yale Law Journal. Upon graduating from Yale, Rodríguez became a Reginald F. Lewis Fellow at Harvard Law School during the 2001–02 academic year.

== Career ==
Before joining the faculty at New York University School of Law (NYU) in 2004, Rodríguez was a law clerk to judge David S. Tatel of the U.S. Court of Appeals for the D.C. Circuit and to justice Sandra Day O'Connor of the U.S. Supreme Court. In 2008, Rodríguez joined the Council on Foreign Relations as a five-year term member and later received tenure from NYU.

From 2011 until 2013, Rodríguez was the Deputy Assistant Attorney General for the Office of Legal Counsel within the United States Department of Justice. In January 2013, Rodríguez left her position as the Deputy Assistant Attorney General to become Yale Law School's first tenured Latino faculty member. The following year, she was named as the Leighton Homer Surbeck Professor of Law.

During the COVID-19 pandemic in North America, Rodríguez was recognized by the American Academy of Arts & Sciences for her accomplishments. She was also named as a member of Agency Review Teams during the presidential transition of Joe Biden. On April 9, 2021, Rodríguez was named Co-Chair of the Presidential Commission on the Supreme Court of the United States.

On May 26, 2022, it was reported that Rodríguez and colleague Justin Driver were possibly being vetted for a vacancy on the United States Court of Appeals for the Second Circuit.

== Selected publications ==
- Negotiating Conflict through Federalism (2014)
- Immigration, Civil Rights, and the Evolution of the People (2013)
- Constraint through Delegation (2010)
- The President and Immigration Law (2009, 2020)
- The Significance of the Local in Immigration Regulation (2008)

== See also ==
- List of law clerks for the eighth seat of the Supreme Court of the United States
