= Yair Listokin =

American legal scholar (born 1975)

Dean of Yale Law School
- Acting
- In office August 1, 2025 – February 1, 2026
- President: Maurie D. McInnis
- Preceded by: Heather K. Gerken
- Succeeded by: Cristina M. Rodríguez

Personal details
- Education: Harvard University (BA); Princeton University (MA, PhD); Yale University (JD)

Yair Jason Listokin (born 1975) is an American legal scholar. He is the Shibley Family Fund Professor of Law at Yale Law School, where he also served as the interim dean of Yale Law School between Fall 2025 and Winter 2026.

== Education and career ==
Listokin graduated from Harvard University with a Bachelor of Arts, magna cum laude, in economics in 1998. He then received a Master of Arts in economics in 2000 and a Ph.D. in economics in 2002, both from Princeton University, and earned his Juris Doctor in 2005 from Yale Law School. His doctoral dissertation at Princeton was supervised by Anne Case and was titled, "Essays in the economics of public enforcement of law".

After graduating from law school, Listokin served as a law clerk for Judge Richard Posner at the U.S. Court of Appeals for the Seventh Circuit from 2005 to 2006. He became an associate professor of law at Yale Law School in 2006, a full professor of law at Yale in 2011, and received the law school's appointment as its Shibley Family Fund Professor in 2014 before serving as its deputy dean from 2022 to 2025. On July 20, 2025, Yale Law School announced that Listokin would succeed Heather Gerken as interim dean; he took office on August 1, 2025.
