= Douglas NeJaime =

Academic background
- Education: Brown University; Harvard Law School

Douglas George NeJaime is an American legal scholar. He is the Anne Urowsky Professor of Law at Yale Law School, where his teaching focuses on family law, legal ethics, law and sexuality, and constitutional law. Prior to Yale, NeJaime taught at the UCLA School of Law, where he served as Faculty Director of the Williams Institute on Sexual Orientation and Gender Identity Law and Public Policy. He is an elected member of the American Law Institute.

== Early life and education ==
Douglas NeJaime was raised in Torrington, Connecticut. He graduated from Torrington High School in 1996, where he was student council president and class valedictorian. NeJaime attended Brown University, graduating magna cum laude in 2000 with a degree in American Civilization. NeJaime earned his Juris Doctor from Harvard Law School in 2003. At Harvard, he served as a Teaching Fellow for Professor Lani Guinier's course "Responsibilities of Public Lawyers."

== Career ==
After graduating from Harvard, NeJaime worked at Irell & Manella for four years. He began teaching in 2009, receiving an appointment at Loyola Law School. NeJaime taught at the University of California, Irvine School of Law for two years before, moving to the UCLA School of Law in 2015. He joined the Yale Law School faculty in 2017.
