= Louis H. Pollak =

American judge (1922–2012)

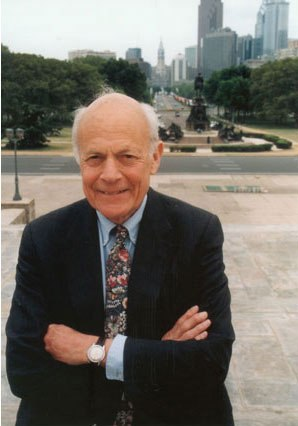

Senior Judge of the United States District Court for the Eastern District of Pennsylvania
- In office January 1, 1991 – May 8, 2012

Judge of the United States District Court for the Eastern District of Pennsylvania
- In office July 12, 1978 – January 1, 1991
- Appointed by: Jimmy Carter
- Preceded by: A. Leon Higginbotham Jr.
- Succeeded by: Eduardo C. Robreno

10th Dean of Yale Law School
- In office 1965–1970
- Preceded by: Eugene V. Rostow
- Succeeded by: Abraham S. Goldstein

Dean of the University of Pennsylvania Law School
- In office 1975–1978

Personal details
- Born: Louis Heilprin Pollak; December 7, 1922 New York City, New York, U.S.
- Died: May 8, 2012 (aged 89) Philadelphia, Pennsylvania, U.S.
- Education: Harvard University (BA); Yale University (LLB)

Louis Heilprin Pollak (December 7, 1922 – May 8, 2012) was a United States district judge of the United States District Court for the Eastern District of Pennsylvania from 1978 to 2012. He was the dean of Yale Law School from 1965 to 1970 and the dean of the University of Pennsylvania Law School from 1975 to 1978. In 2000, he was elected to the American Philosophical Society.

== Education and career ==
Born in New York City, New York, Pollak received his Bachelor of Arts degree magna cum laude from Harvard University in 1943 and his Bachelor of Laws from the Yale Law School in 1948, where he was editor of the Yale Law Journal. After completing his undergraduate studies at Harvard, Pollak entered the United States Army in 1943, during World War II, serving until 1946. The war ended before he would be deployed outside of the United States. Pollak served as a law clerk to Justice Wiley Rutledge of the United States Supreme Court following graduation from law school. After completing his clerkship, from 1949 to 1951, Pollak worked at the law firm now known as Paul, Weiss, Rifkind, Wharton & Garrison. He then served in the United States Department of State as special assistant to Ambassador-at-large Philip C. Jessup until 1953. Thereafter, Pollak worked as assistant counsel for the Amalgamated Clothing Workers of America. In 1955, Pollak joined the faculty of Yale Law School, where he would remain until 1974. He served as dean from 1965 to 1970.

In 1974, he moved to the University of Pennsylvania Law School, becoming dean the following year. In 1978, he left the University when he was appointed to the bench. Until his death, Pollak remained an adjunct member of the Penn Law faculty and taught there regularly.

=== Other legal service ===
Beginning in 1950, Pollak provided assistance to the NAACP Legal Defense Fund. He worked actively on Brown v. Board of Education. Because he was then working for the State Department, he was not listed on the briefs in the Supreme Court.

== Federal judicial service ==
Pollak was nominated by President Jimmy Carter on June 7, 1978, to a seat on the United States District Court for the Eastern District of Pennsylvania vacated by Judge A. Leon Higginbotham Jr. He was confirmed by the United States Senate on July 10, 1978, and received his commission on July 12, 1978. He assumed senior status on January 1, 1991, serving in that status until his death on May 8, 2012, in the West Mount Airy neighborhood of Philadelphia, Pennsylvania.

== Personal ==
Pollak's father, Walter H. Pollak, was also a well-known lawyer. He is now remembered especially for his work in major civil rights cases, including Gitlow v. New York and representation of the Scottsboro Boys. From 1952, Pollak was married to Katherine Weiss Pollak, the daughter of Louis S. Weiss, a founding partner of the Paul, Weiss law firm. They had five daughters and eight grandchildren.

== See also ==
- List of law clerks for the third seat of the Supreme Court of the United States

Academic offices
Preceded by Eugene V. Rostow	Dean of Yale Law School; 1965–1970	Succeeded by Abraham S. Goldstein
Preceded by Bernard Wolfman	Dean of the University of Pennsylvania Law School; 1977–1978	Succeeded by James O. Freedman
Legal offices
Preceded by A. Leon Higginbotham Jr.	Judge of the United States District Court for the Eastern District of Pennsylvania; 1978–1991	Succeeded by Eduardo C. Robreno
