= Abraham S. Goldstein =

Abraham Samuel Goldstein
- Born: July 27, 1925; New York City, U.S.
- Died: August 20, 2005 (aged 80); Woodbridge, Connecticut, U.S.
- Education: City College of New York; Yale University
- Occupations: Professor, dean
- Known for: Former Dean of Yale Law School

Abraham Samuel Goldstein (July 27, 1925 – August 20, 2005) was a law professor and the eleventh dean of the Yale Law School.

== Biography ==
Goldstein served in the U.S. Army during World War II. He received an undergraduate degree in economics from City College of New York in 1946 and then entered the Yale Law School, from which he received an LL.B. in 1949. He subsequently served as the first law clerk of Judge David L. Bazelon of the United States Court of Appeals for the District of Columbia. After clerking, Goldstein joined the Yale Law faculty in 1956, was named a full professor in 1961, the William Nelson Cromwell Professor of Law in 1967, and Sterling Professor of Law in 1975. He served as dean from 1970 to 1975, and then returned to teaching. In 1970, he also served on the sponsoring board of the Lawyers Military Defense Committee, an organization providing free civilian counsel to U.S. military personnel in Vietnam.

His publications included The Insanity Defense (1967); The Myth of Judicial Supervision on Three Inquisitorial Systems (1977); The Passive Judiciary: Prosecutorial Discretion and the Guilty Plea (1980); and numerous articles on criminal law and procedure, the principal subjects that he taught to several generations of Yale Law students.

== Notes ==
Academic offices
Preceded by Louis Heilprin Pollak	Dean of Yale Law School; 1970–1975	Succeeded by Harry Hillel Wellington
