= Reva Siegel =

American legal academic and writer

Reva B. Siegel (born 1956) is an American legal writer and the Nicholas deB. Katzenbach Professor of Law at Yale Law School. Siegel's writing focuses on reproductive law, originalism the Second Amendment to the United States Constitution, and racial issues. Siegel received her B.A., M.Phil, and J.D. from Yale University, clerked for Judge Spottswood William Robinson III on the D.C. Circuit, and began teaching at the University of California at Berkeley. She is a member of the American Academy of Arts and Sciences, and is active in the American Society for Legal History, the Association of American Law Schools, the American Constitution Society, in the national organization and as faculty advisor of Yale's chapter. She was elected to the American Philosophical Society in 2018.

== Selected works ==
=== Articles ===
- Greenhouse, Linda; Siegel, Reva B. (June 2011). "Before (and after) Roe v. Wade: New Questions about Backlash". Yale Law Journal. 120 (8): 2028–2087.
- Siegel, Reva B. (2007). "The New Politics of Abortion: An Equality Analysis of Woman-Protective Abortion Restrictions". University of Illinois Law Review. 2007 (3): 991–1054.
- Siegel, Reva B. (April 2023). "Memory Games: Dobbs's Originalism as Anti-Democratic Living Constitutionalism - and Some Pathways for Resistance". Texas Law Review. 101 (5): 1127–1204.
- Siegel, Reva B. (June 1996). "The Rule of Love: Wife Beating as Prerogative and Privacy". Yale Law Journal. 105 (8): 2117–2208.
- Siegel, Reva B.; Mayeri, Serena; Murray, Melissa (June 2011). "Equal Protection in Dobbs and beyond: How States Protect Life inside and outside of the Abortion Context". Columbia Journal of Gender and Law. 43 (1): 67–97.
- Siegel, Reva B. (Fall 2014). "Abortion and the Woman Question: Forty Years of Debate". Indiana Law Review. 89 (4): 1365–1380.
- Siegel, Reva B. (April 2008). "The Right's Reasons: Constitutional Conflict and the Spread of Woman-Protective Antiabortion Argument". Duke Law Journal. 57 (8): 1641–1692.
- Post, Robert; Siegel, Reva B. (Summer 2007). "Roe Rage: Democratic Constitutionalism and Backlash". Harvard Civil Rights-Civil Liberties Law Review. 42 (2): 373–434.
- Siegel, Reva B. (2007). "Sex Equality Arguments for Reproductive Rights: Their Critical Basis and Evolving Constitutional Expression". Emory Law Journal. 56 (4): 815–842.
- Post, Robert; Siegel, Reva B. (November 2006). "Originalism as a Political Practice: The Right's Living Constitution". Fordham Law Review. 75 (2): 545–574.

=== Books ===
- Processes of Constitutional Decisionmaking (6th ed., 2014) (with Paul Brest, Sanford Levinson, Jack Balkin, and Akhil Amar)
- Before Roe v. Wade: Voices that Shaped the Abortion Debate Before the Supreme Court's Ruling (Kaplan Publishing, 2010) (with Linda Greenhouse).
- Directions in Sexual Harassment Law, co-edited with Catharine A. MacKinnon (Yale University Press, 2004). Collection of 40 essays, including authored introductory essay, A Short History of Sexual Harassment
