= Kate Stith =

Professor

- Education: Dartmouth College (BA); Harvard University (JD, MPA)
- Occupations: Lafayette S. Foster Professor of Law and the former acting-Dean of Yale Law School
- Spouse: José A. Cabranes
- Relatives: Laura Denvir Stith (sister)

Kate Stith, also known as Kate Stith-Cabranes, is the Lafayette S. Foster Professor of Law and the former acting dean of Yale Law School. Her appointment was announced on March 23, 2009, by Yale University President Richard Levin, when former dean Harold Koh was nominated to serve as Legal Adviser of the Department of State. Stith is a former Assistant United States Attorney for the Southern District of New York.

== Education ==
Stith received a B.A. degree from Dartmouth College in 1973, a J.D. degree from Harvard Law School and a Masters of Public Policy from Harvard Kennedy School, both in 1977. She clerked for Judge Carl McGowan of the U.S. Court of Appeals for the District of Columbia and for Supreme Court Justice Byron R. White.

== Career ==
From 1979 to 1980, Stith was a staff economist for Jimmy Carter's Council of Economic Advisers. From 1980 to 1981, she served as a Special Assistant to the Assistant Attorney General for the Criminal Division at DOJ. From 1981 to 1984, Stith was an Assistant United States Attorney in the Southern District of New York under John S. Martin Jr. and Rudy Giuliani, and focused on white collar and organized crime.

Stith began teaching at Yale Law School (YLS) in 1985.

Her interest in criminal procedure has led her to serve as an adviser to the American Law Institute's Model Penal Code Sentencing and, following an appointment by the Chief Justice of the Supreme Court of the United States, on the Advisory Committee for the Federal Rules of Criminal Procedure. She has also participated in the National Research Council's Committee on Law and Justice, the state of Connecticut's Professional Ethics Committee; the Permanent Commission on the Status of Women in Connecticut; the Women's Campaign School at Yale; and the Connecticut Bar Foundation (as President). Stith served on the Dartmouth College Board of Directors and as Deputy Dean of Yale Law School.

On March 23, 2009, Stith was named Acting Dean of the Yale Law School, the first woman ever to be appointed to lead YLS. She was one of the witnesses who testified in favor of Sonia Sotomayor during her Supreme Court confirmation hearings. She served on the Board of Trustees of Dartmouth College from 1989 to 2000.

== Works ==
Stith has published extensively in law journals. Her book, Fear of Judging, written with her husband, José Cabranes, won a Certificate of Merit from the American Bar Association in 1999.

== Personal life ==
Stith is married to Judge José A. Cabranes of the United States Court of Appeals for the Second Circuit, and is the sister of Laura Denvir Stith, who served on the Missouri Supreme Court from 2001 to 2021.

== See also ==
- List of law clerks for the sixth seat of the Supreme Court of the United States

Academic offices
Preceded by Harold Hongju Koh	Dean of Yale Law School (acting); 2009	Succeeded by Robert Post
