= Wesley Alba Sturges =

American legal scholar (1893–1962)

Wesley Alba Sturges (1893–1962) was an American legal scholar who served as a professor of law at the Yale Law School from 1924 to 1961, and served as dean of the law school from 1945 to 1954. He received his LL.B. from Yale in 1923. He retired from Yale in 1961 to become dean of the University of Miami School of Law. He was a prominent figure in Yale's Legal Realism movement. In his article (with Samuel Clark), "Legal Theory and Real Property Mortgages", 37 Yale L. J. 691 (1928), he sought to make the Legal Realist point that doctrinal distinctions between "lien theory" and "title theory" did not have any actual effect on how courts ruled in litigation about mortgage disputes. His casebook, Cases and Materials on the Law of Credit Transactions, emphasized the contradictions in judicial decision-making and sought to dispel the view that "what judges said in one case with its setting can be used to [predict] what they will decide in another case" with a different factual setting.

From 22 October 1938, Sturges fulfilled the role of Executive Director of the Distilled Spirits Institute and gave evidence to the US Congress Investigation of Concentration of Economic Power (Parts 6-8 Liquor Industry) between 14 and 17 March 1939. As 'czar' of the nation's distilled liquor industry, Sturges drew up a code of practice to reform commercial practices, maintain an open competitive market, to end the system of secret rebates and other corner-cutting dodges, and to balance the field between larger and smaller operations.

After he stepped down from the deanship, Sturges taught only three courses, annually in rotation, one semester each year—arbitration, real-property credit transactions, and chattel credit transactions. Using an advanced form of the Socratic method, he sought in these courses to teach students rhetoric and advocacy rather than substantive law—what he termed "learning to stand up on your hind legs and make noises like a lawyer." He was famous at Yale for his technique of calling upon a student to recite what a case held, asking him whether he agreed or disagreed with the court's ruling, and regardless of how the student replied, slowly forcing him by pointing out difficulties in that position, to adopt the contrary view, whereupon Sturges would by the same technique then argue the student back to conceding the validity of his original position. The point was to teach students both how to make noises like a lawyer and not to get led down the primrose path by an adversary.

Professor Grant Gilmore said of Wesley Sturges:

What did Wesley teach us?...He taught us forever to be on our guard against the slippery generality, the received principle, the authoritative proposition. He taught us to trust no one's judgment except our own—and not to be too sure of that. He taught us how to live by our wits. He taught us, in a word, how to be lawyers.

Professor Ralph S. Brown said of Sturges:

Sturges was the most compelling teacher of my time. He was just a master of the Socratic method. You never knew what ball was under that shell ...

Academic offices
Preceded by Ashbel Green Gulliver	Dean of Yale Law School; 1946–1954	Succeeded by Harry Shulman
