= James F. Simon =

American legal historian

- Born: November 26, 1938 (age 87); Fort Worth, Texas
- Spouse: Laya Marcia (m. 1963)
- Children: 3

Academic background
- Education: Yale University

James Frank Simon (born November 26, 1938) is an American legal historian who served as dean of New York Law School from 1983 to 1992.

== Early life and education ==
Simon was born on November 26, 1938, in Fort Worth, Texas. His father, Richard Simon, was an attorney, and his mother, Natalie Simon, was a homemaker. He graduated from Yale University with a B.A. degree in 1961 and received his LLB degree from the same university in 1964. He traveled to India on a Ford Foundation Africa-Asia Fellowship in 1964–65.

== Career ==
Simon began working at Newsweek in 1963, and in 1967, he left to begin working at the St. Louis Post-Dispatch. He worked at Time from 1969 to 1974. In 1975, he joined the faculty of New York Law School, serving as its dean from 1983 to 1992. He now serves as Martin Professor of Law Emeritus and Dean Emeritus at New York Law School. In 2023, the Dolph Briscoe Center for American History received his papers, which include correspondences and interviews with Supreme Court justices.

== Work ==
Simon has been described as the "preeminent historian of the U.S. Supreme Court". His 1973 book In His Own Image: The Supreme Court in Richard Nixon’s America won the Silver Gavel Award from the American Bar Association. He subsequently wrote numerous other well-known books about the history of the Supreme Court, including Independent Journey: The Life of William O. Douglas (1980) and The Center Holds: The Power Struggle Inside the Rehnquist Court (1995). His ninth book, Eisenhower vs. Warren: The Battle for Civil Rights and Liberties, was published by Liveright in 2018. In a review of the book in the New York Times, Lincoln Caplan described it as "enjoyably readable," "thoroughly researched," and "an absorbing book about a saga in American law and politics that remains centrally important."

== Bibliography ==
- Simon, James F. (2018-04-10). Eisenhower vs. Warren: The Battle for Civil Rights and Liberties. Liveright. ISBN 978-0-8714-0766-5.
- Simon, James F. (2012-02-07). FDR and Chief Justice Hughes: The President, the Supreme Court, and the Epic Battle Over the New Deal. Simon & Schuster. ISBN 978-1-4165-7889-5.
- Simon, James F. (2006-11-07). Lincoln and Chief Justice Taney: Slavery, Secession, and the President's War Powers. Simon & Schuster. ISBN 978-0-7432-9846-9.
- Simon, James (2002). What Kind of Nation: Thomas Jefferson, John Marshall, and the Epic Struggle to Create a United States. Simon & Schuster. ISBN 978-5-5592-9973-0.
- Simon, James (1989). The Antagonists: Hugo Black, Felix Frankfurter and Civil Liberties in Modern America. Simon & Schuster. ISBN 978-0-6714-7797-4.
- Simon, James (1980). Independent Journey: The Life of William O. Douglas. Harper & Row. ISBN 978-0-0601-4042-7.
- Simon, James (1973). In His Own Image: The Supreme Court in Richard Nixon's America. David McKay Publications. ISBN 978-0-6793-0242-1.
