= Charles Edward Clark =

American judge (1889–1963)

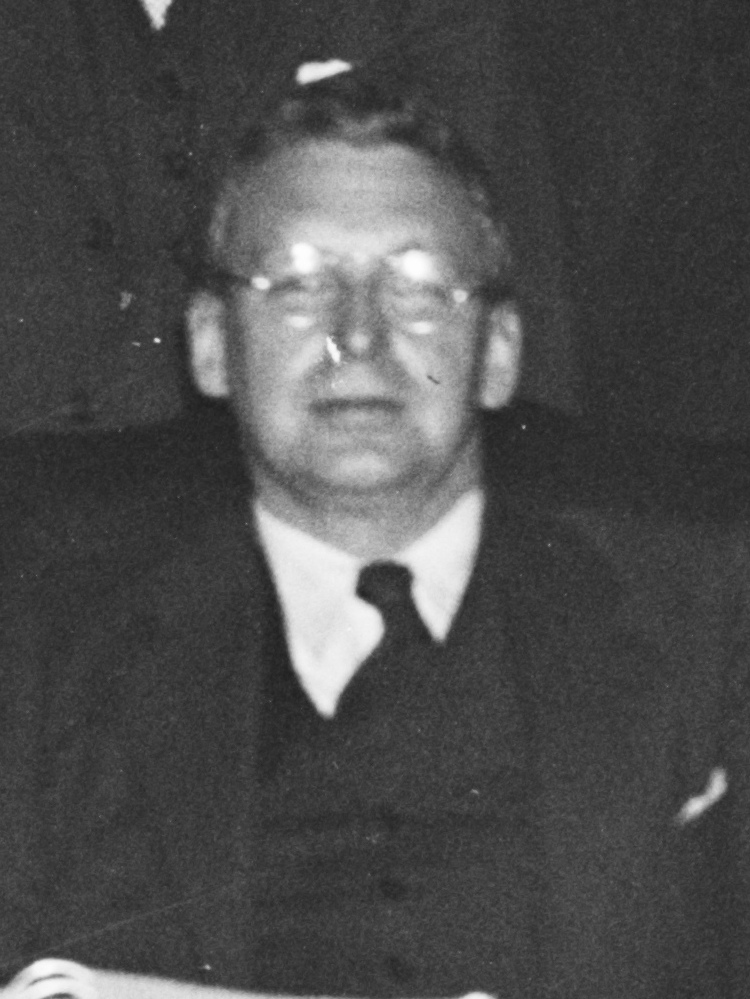

Chief Judge of the United States Court of Appeals for the Second Circuit
- In office 1954–1959
- Preceded by: Harrie B. Chase
- Succeeded by: J. Edward Lumbard

Judge of the United States Court of Appeals for the Second Circuit
- In office March 9, 1939 – December 13, 1963
- Appointed by: Franklin D. Roosevelt
- Preceded by: Seat established by 52 Stat. 584
- Succeeded by: Robert P. Anderson

5th Dean of Yale Law School
- In office 1929–1939
- Preceded by: Robert Maynard Hutchins
- Succeeded by: Ashbel Green Gulliver

Personal details
- Born: December 9, 1889 Woodbridge, Connecticut, U.S.
- Died: December 13, 1963 (aged 74) Hamden, Connecticut, U.S.
- Party: Republican
- Education: Yale University (BA, LLB)

Charles Edward Clark (December 9, 1889 – December 13, 1963) was the 5th Dean of Yale Law School, a United States circuit judge of the United States Court of Appeals for the Second Circuit, and "the principal draftsman" of the Federal Rules of Civil Procedure.

== Education and career ==
Born on December 9, 1889, in Woodbridge, Connecticut, to Samuel Orman Clark and Pauline C. Marquand, Clark received a Bachelor of Arts degree in 1911 from Yale University. He received a Bachelor of Laws in 1913 from Yale Law School. He entered private practice in New Haven, Connecticut from 1913 to 1919. He was a member of the Connecticut House of Representatives from 1917 to 1918, and was Republican. He was a professor of law at Yale Law School from 1919 to 1929. He was a Deputy Judge of the Hamden, Connecticut Town Court from 1927 to 1931. He was the Sterling Professor of Law and Dean of Yale Law School from 1929 to 1939.

The Supreme Court of the United States appointed him as the Reporter to the Advisory Committee on Rules for Civil Procedure in 1935, and the rules that were proposed by that Committee became the Federal Rules of Civil Procedure in 1938.

He was Special Assistant Attorney General for the Antitrust Division of the United States Department of Justice in 1938.

== Federal judicial service ==
Clark was nominated by President Franklin D. Roosevelt on January 5, 1939, to the United States Court of Appeals for the Second Circuit, to a new seat authorized by 52 Stat. 584. He was confirmed by the United States Senate on March 7, 1939, and received his commission on March 9, 1939. He served as Chief Judge and as a member of the Judicial Conference of the United States from 1954 to 1959. His service terminated on December 13, 1963, due to his death in Hamden.

Charles Alan Wright, who went on to coauthor the 54-volume treatise Federal Practice and Procedure, served as a law clerk to Judge Clark.

=== Other service ===
Clark was a visiting lecturer in law at Yale University from 1951 to 1963.

Academic offices
Preceded by Robert Maynard Hutchins	Dean of Yale Law School; 1929–1939	Succeeded by Ashbel Green Gulliver
Legal offices
Preceded by Seat established by 52 Stat. 584	Judge of the United States Court of Appeals for the Second Circuit; 1939–1963	Succeeded by Robert P. Anderson
Preceded by Harrie B. Chase	Chief Judge of the United States Court of Appeals for the Second Circuit; 1954–1959	Succeeded by J. Edward Lumbard
