= Harold Hongju Koh =

American lawyer and legal scholar (born 1954)

Harold Koh
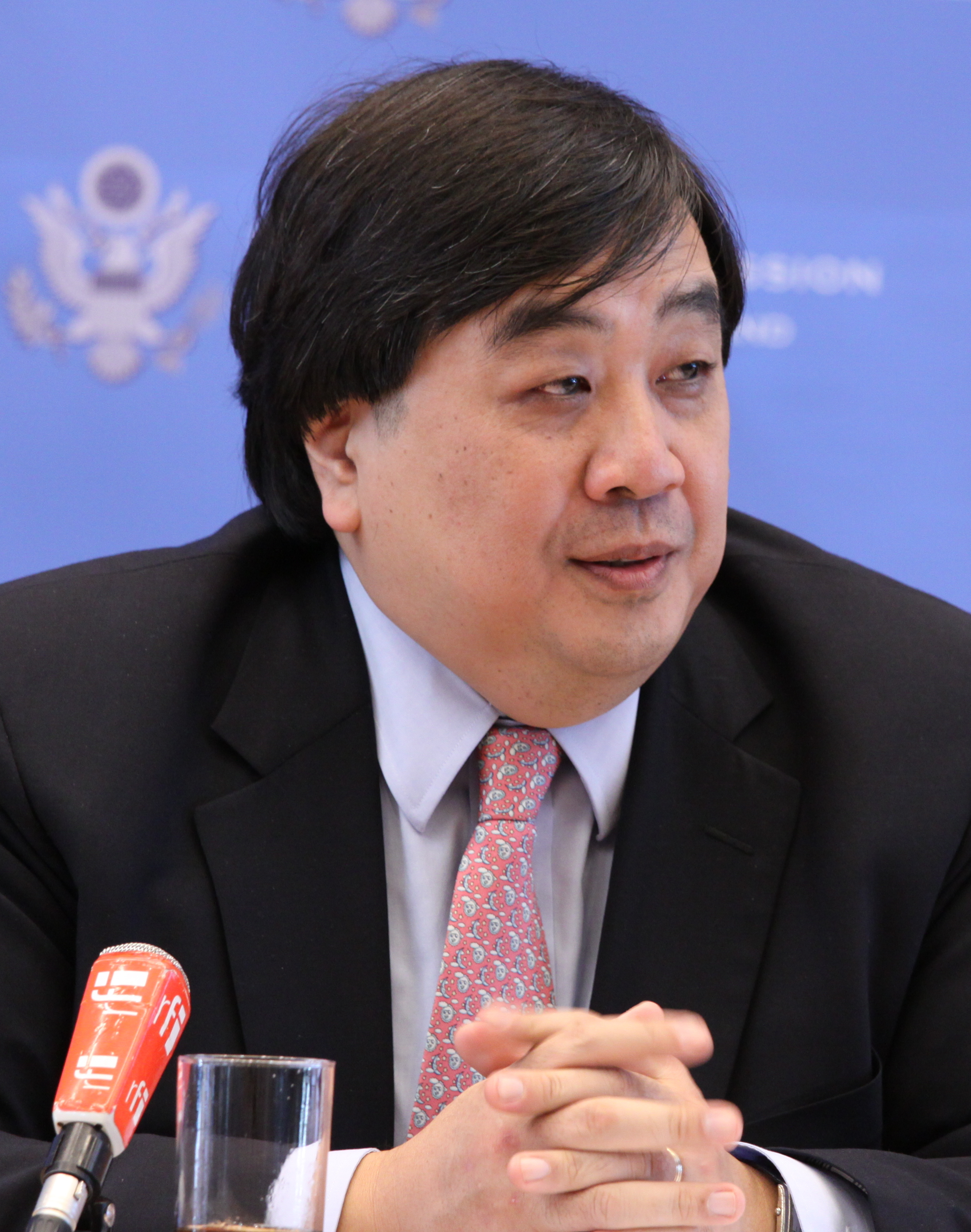
- Koh in 2010

22nd Legal Adviser of the Department of State
- In office June 25, 2009 – January 22, 2013
- President: Barack Obama
- Preceded by: John B. Bellinger III
- Succeeded by: Brian Egan

15th Dean of Yale Law School
- In office July 1, 2004 – March 23, 2009
- Preceded by: Anthony T. Kronman
- Succeeded by: Kate Stith (acting)

7th Assistant Secretary of State for Democracy, Human Rights, and Labor
- In office November 13, 1998 – January 20, 2001
- President: Bill Clinton
- Preceded by: John Shattuck
- Succeeded by: Lorne Craner

Personal details
- Born: December 8, 1954 (age 71) Boston, Massachusetts, U.S.
- Party: Democratic
- Spouse: Mary-Christy Fisher
- Relations: Howard Koh (brother); Daniel Koh (nephew)
- Children: 2
- Education: Harvard University (BA, JD); Magdalen College, Oxford (MA)
- Awards: Marshall Scholarship (1977); American Philosophical Society (2007); Sterling Professor (2013)

Korean name
- Hangul: 고홍주
- Hanja: 高洪株
- RR: Go Hongju
- MR: Ko Hongju

Harold Hongju Koh (born December 8, 1954) is an American diplomat, lawyer, legal scholar, politician, and writer. Except for his periods of government service, he has taught at Yale Law School from 1985 to the present, including as the law school's 15th Dean from 2004 to 2009, and currently as a Sterling Professor of international law. From 1998 to 2001, he served as the Assistant Secretary of State for Democracy, Human Rights, and Labor under President Bill Clinton. From 2009 to 2013, he served as the legal adviser of the Department of State in the Obama administration. He has published more than ten books on topics including international law, the U.S. Constitution, and international relations. He was elected to the American Philosophical Society in 2007.

== Early life and family ==
Koh was born in Boston, Massachusetts, on December 8, 1954. His parents grew up in Korea under Japanese rule in an area that later became part of North Korea. He has described his family thus:

They grew up under Japanese colonial rule, forbidden to speak Korean or even to use their Korean names. When their country was divided after World War II, my mother and her family were trapped in North Korea. In desperation, they hiked for days to the border to be picked up and were brought back to Seoul. But even there, they lived under dictatorship. For less than a year in the 1960s, (South) Korea enjoyed democracy. My father joined the diplomatic corps. But one day, tanks rolled and a coup d'état toppled the government, leaving us to grow up in America.

After the coup, Koh's father, legal scholar and diplomat Kwang Lim Koh, was granted asylum in the United States. He moved to New Haven, Connecticut, with his family and took a teaching position at Yale. His wife, Hesung Chun Koh (Harold Koh's mother), had a Ph.D. in sociology and taught at Yale as well—they were the first Asian Americans to teach there.

Harold was struck by polio at age six; he went through "two operations, leg braces, and endless rehabilitation" and as a result still walks with a limp.

Koh has six siblings. Howard Koh—a Harvard University public health professor and former Massachusetts Public Health Commissioner—previously served as the United States Assistant Secretary for Health in the Obama administration. His sister Jean Koh Peters also teaches at Yale Law School.

Koh's wife, Mary-Christy Fisher, is an attorney employed by the Connecticut Veterans Legal Center; they have two children.

== Education ==
Koh graduated in 1971 from the Hopkins School in New Haven, then graduated summa cum laude and Phi Beta Kappa from Harvard University in 1975 with a bachelor's degree in government, before studying at Oxford University as a Marshall Scholar. He later earned a Juris Doctor from Harvard Law School in 1980, where he was an editor of the Harvard Law Review and graduated cum laude.

In June 2024, Koh received an honorary Doctor of Laws from the University of Toronto in recognition of his commitment to the public interest and his advocacy for the rule of law and human rights.

== Early career and scholarship ==
After law school, Koh was a law clerk for Judge Malcolm Richard Wilkey of the U.S. Court of Appeals for the District of Columbia Circuit from 1980 to 1981 and for U.S. Supreme Court justice Harry Blackmun 1981 to 1982. In 1982 and 1983, he worked as an associate at Covington & Burling. From 1983 to 1985, Koh worked as an attorney-adviser to the Office of Legal Counsel (OLC) in the United States Department of Justice during the Reagan Administration.

He joined the Yale Law School faculty in 1985. His students have included John Yoo, with whom he co-authored a paper on "Dollar Diplomacy/Dollar Defense: The Fabric of Economics and National Security Law." Since 1993 he has been the Gerard C. and Bernice Latrobe Smith Professor of International Law; he became the law school's 15th dean in 2004. From 1985 to 1991, Koh largely devoted himself to writing and teaching. A notable paper Koh wrote was a November 1990 legal brief challenging the first president Bush's contention that he could fight the Gulf War on his own authority. Koh argued that "the Constitution requires the president to 'consult with Congress and receive its affirmative authorization — not merely present it with faits accomplis — before engaging in war.'"

In 1992–93, he led a group of Yale students and human rights lawyers in litigation against the United States government to free Haitian refugees interned at Guantanamo Bay, Cuba. As chronicled in Brandt Goldstein's book, Storming the Court (Scribner 2005), Koh and the plaintiffs prevailed in the case, Haitian Centers Council v. Sale, and the Haitians were released in the spring of 1993. At the same time, Koh and his team of law students argued a related case Sale v. Haitian Centers Council (1993) before the U.S. Supreme Court but the court ruled against them on an 8–1 vote.

Koh is the author of nine books, including The National Security Constitution: Sharing Power after the Iran-Contra Affair (Yale University Press,1990); Transnational Legal Problems (with Harry Steiner and Detlev Vagts, Foundation Press, 1994); Deliberative Democracy and Human Rights (with Ronald C. Slye, Yale University Press, 1999); Transnational Litigation in United States Courts (Foundation Press, 2008); and The National Security Constitution in the Twenty-First Century (Yale University Press, 2024). He has also written over 175 law review articles and legal editorials. He is a prominent advocate of human rights and civil rights; he has argued and written briefs on a wide number of cases before U.S. appellate courts, and has testified before the U.S. Congress more than a dozen times. He has received numerous awards, medals, and honorary degrees.

Blogger David Lat and George Mason professor David Bernstein (contributing to the Volokh Conspiracy), have described Koh as a "highly partisan Democrat" and claim that he has politically polarized Yale Law School during his tenure as dean. Other observers countered that during his tenure prominent conservatives have been appointed to the Yale Law School faculty, and noted that Koh served in both Republican (Reagan) and Democratic (Clinton) administrations. A group of Yale Conservative Law Students offered a vigorous defense of Koh, noting that "Dean Koh has been very supportive of conservative students and conservative student organizations."

They concluded that "Dean Koh is one of the brightest legal minds of his generation, a credit to the profession we look forward to joining, and an able and effective public servant." On May 4, 2010, the Friends of the Law Library of the Library of Congress presented Koh with their annual award named for George W. Wickersham.

== Law reform work ==
Koh was elected to the American Law Institute in 1992 and was elected to the ALI Council in 2007. He stepped down from the Council when he worked for the Obama administration, but was re-elected to Council when he ended his tenure with the State Department and returned to Yale. He currently serves as a Counselor on the Restatement Fourth, the Foreign Relations Law of the United States, and previously served as an Adviser on the Principles of Transnational Civil Procedure project.

== State Department Legal Adviser ==
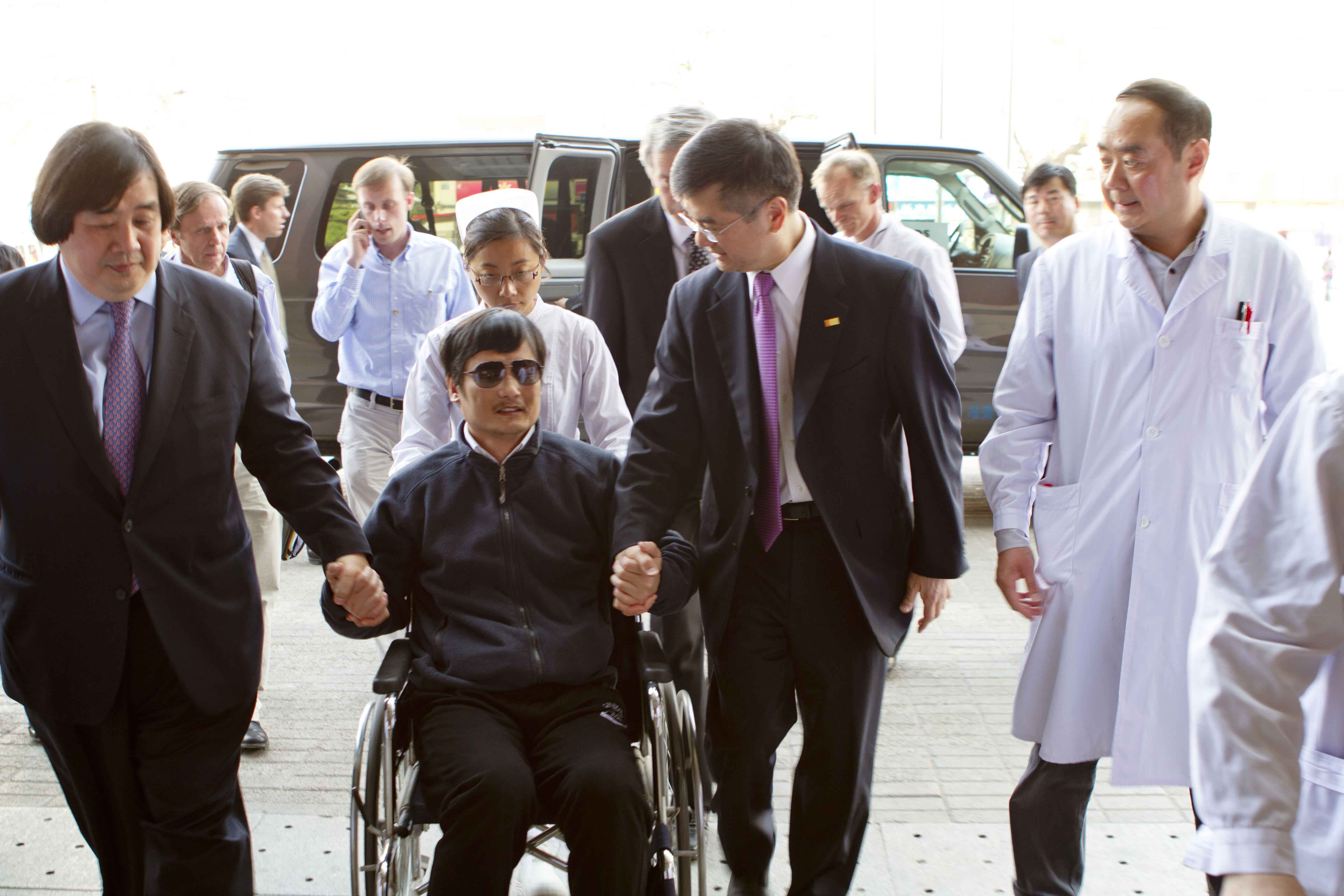
Harold Koh (left), as Legal Adviser of the U.S. Department of State with the blind Chinese lawyer Chen Guangcheng (center) and U.S. Ambassador to China Gary Locke (right) at the U.S. Embassy in Beijing, China, on May 1, 2012; Jake Sullivan is in the background. Koh assisted Chen Guangcheng, who sought refuge at the embassy from persecution by the Chinese authorities, in securing medical treatment and the right to travel out of China to pursue legal studies in the United States.

=== Nomination and confirmation ===
On March 23, 2009, the White House announced Koh's nomination as Legal Adviser to the State Department in the Obama administration, the senior legal adviser to Secretary of State Hillary Clinton. His nomination was generally supported in the Senate and among legal colleagues. The nomination drew criticism from some conservative commentators for his views on international law and its use in American legal analysis and jurisprudence, while drawing support from other conservatives such as Ted Olson and Kenneth Starr as well as Forbes magazine.

Koh has written in support of the practice of using tenets of international law and foreign legal precedent to inform the deliberative process of judicial decision making in the United States, and has described what he has called "transnational jurisprudence" as essential to maintaining a well-ordered international legal system. Arguing that "concepts like liberty, equality and privacy are not exclusively American constitutional ideas but, rather, part and parcel of the global human rights movement" Koh has traced the influence of decisions from foreign courts throughout the history of the U.S. Supreme Court and the American court system.

Critics of this approach argue that citing foreign decisions as legal precedents threatens American sovereignty and "lends itself to manipulation." Other commentators have observed that the "use of such nonbinding sources to bolster legal arguments is a central and uncontroversial tenet of the American judicial process."

On May 12, 2009, the Senate Committee on Foreign Relations voted 12–5 in favor of Koh. After a hold was placed on his nomination, Senate Majority Leader Harry Reid announced on June 22, 2009, that he would invoke cloture on the nomination. On June 24, 2009, the Senate voted 65–31 to end debate on the nomination, paving the way for a full Senate vote the following day. The following day, Koh was confirmed by the Senate in a 62–35 vote. While working in government, Koh took a leave of absence from Yale Law School.

=== Views on targeted killing ===
In a March 2010 speech, Koh voiced his strong support for the legality of targeted killing by aerial drone strikes in Pakistan, Yemen, and other countries included by the U.S. government as being within the scope of the war on terror. The State Department's legal adviser said that "U.S. targeting practices, including lethal operations conducted with the use of unmanned aerial vehicles (UAVs)", which the Obama administration has leaned on heavily in its efforts to eliminate al-Qaeda and other terrorist groups in Asia, "comply with all applicable law, including the laws of war", citing the principles of distinction and proportionality. He said that the U.S. adheres to these standards, and takes great care in the "planning and execution to ensure that only legitimate objectives are targeted, and that collateral damage is kept to a minimum."

He said the U.S. is in "an armed conflict with al-Qaeda, the Taliban, and the associated forces", and therefore has the lawful right to use force to protect its citizens "consistent with its inherent right to self-defense" under international law. Koh identified three elements that the U.S. considers when determining whether to authorize a specific targeted drone killing:

- Imminence of the threat;
- Sovereignty of other States involved; and
- Willingness and ability of those States to suppress the threat the target poses.

He also said that the drone strikes against al-Qaeda and its allies were lawful targeted killing, as part of the military action authorized by Congress, and not assassination, which is banned by executive order. Under domestic law, U.S. targeted killings against 9/11-related entities is authorized by the Authorization for Use of Military Force Against Terrorists. The speech earned praise from the editorial board of The Wall Street Journal.

Koh's views on targeted killings have been criticized by analysts who have stressed the inconsistency between his critique of Bush's war on terror policy and his later views on law and counterterrorism.

Koh was also criticized by lawyer Jennifer Robinson, who represents activist Julian Assange, for addressing a letter to both her and her client. Robinson felt this was in breach of legal custom.

=== Resignation ===
He left the State Department in January 2013, returning to Yale University as a Sterling Professor of international law.

== Publications ==
- The National Security Constitution in the Twenty-First Century, Yale University Press, 2024.
- The Trump Administration and International Law, Oxford University Press, 2018.
- Transnational Litigation in United States Courts (Concepts and Insights), Foundation Press, 2008.
- The National Security Constitution: Sharing Power after the Iran-Contra Affair. Yale University Press, 1990.

== Lectures ==
From International to Transnational Law in the Lecture Series of the United Nations Audiovisual Library of International Law.

== See also ==
- Barack Obama Supreme Court candidates
- List of law clerks for the second seat of the Supreme Court of the United States

Political offices
Preceded by John Shattuck	Assistant Secretary of State for Democracy, Human Rights, and Labor; 1998–2001	Succeeded by Lorne Craner
Preceded by Joan Donoghue; Acting	Legal Adviser of the Department of State; 2009–2013	Succeeded by Mary McLeod; Acting
Academic offices
Preceded by Anthony Kronman	Dean of Yale Law School; 2004–2009	Succeeded by Kate Stith; Acting
