= Yale Law School =

Law school in New Haven, Connecticut, US

- Parent school: Yale University
- Established: 1824; 202 years ago
- School type: Private law school
- Dean: Cristina M. Rodríguez
- Location: New Haven, Connecticut, US; 41.312°N 72.928°W
- USNWR ranking: 2nd (tie) (2026)
- Bar pass rate: 99%
- Website: law.yale.edu
- ABA profile: Standard 509 Report

Yale Law School (YLS) is the law school of Yale University, a private Ivy League research university in New Haven, Connecticut. It was established in 1824.

Each class in Yale Law's three-year J.D. program enrolls approximately 200 students. Yale's flagship law review is the Yale Law Journal, one of the most highly cited legal publications in the United States. According to Yale Law School's ABA-required disclosures, 83% of the Class of 2019 obtained full-time, long-term, JD-required or JD-advantage employment nine months after graduation, excluding solo practitioners. The 2026 acceptance rate was 4.2%, the lowest of any law school in the United States. Its yield rate in 2026 was 90%, the highest of any law school in the United States.

Yale Law alumni include many prominent figures in law and politics, including U.S. presidents Gerald Ford and Bill Clinton, U.S. vice president JD Vance, U.S. secretaries of state Cyrus Vance and Hillary Clinton, U.S. secretaries of the treasury Henry H. Fowler and Robert Rubin, and nine U.S. attorneys general. Other alumni include current U.S. Supreme Court justices Clarence Thomas, Samuel Alito, Sonia Sotomayor and Brett Kavanaugh, as well as multiple former justices, including Abe Fortas, Potter Stewart and Byron White; several heads of state, including German president Karl Carstens, Philippine president Jose P. Laurel, and Malawi president Peter Mutharika; and U.S. senators, governors, and officials.

== History ==
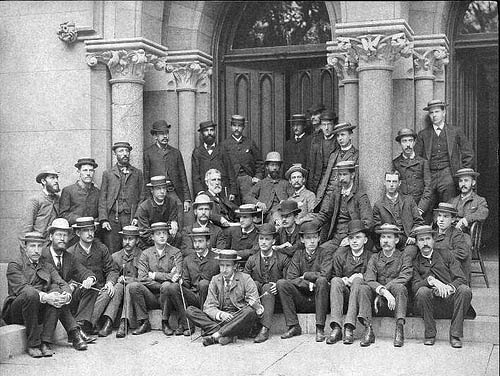
Yale Law School class of 1883

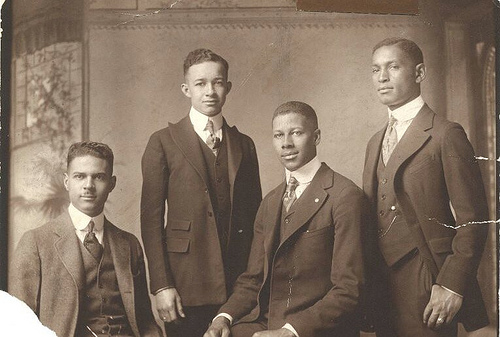
Four African-American students, class of 1921

=== Early days ===
The school began in the early 1800s in the New Haven law office of Seth P. Staples, who began training lawyers. By 1810, Staples was operating a law school. He took on a former student, Samuel Johnson Hitchcock, as a law partner, and Hitchcock became the proprietor of the New Haven Law School, joined by David Daggett in 1824. The Yale Law School shield (shown at the upper right of this page) shows staples and a rampant dog, representing Seth Staples and David Daggett. The school's affiliation with Yale began in the mid-1820s and in 1843, the school's students began receiving Yale degrees.

Daggett went on to serve as the mayor of New Haven, a U.S. senator, and a judge of the Connecticut Supreme Court of Errors (now the Connecticut Supreme Court). An opponent of education for African Americans and a supporter of colonization, he helped lead opposition to the establishment of a college for African Americans in New Haven and presided over the trial of a woman who ran a boarding school for African American girls.

=== 21st century ===
The law school's 15th dean, Harold Koh (2004–2009), made human rights a focus of the law school's work, building on a tradition that had developed over the previous two decades. On March 23, 2009, the White House announced the appointment of Koh to the United States Department of State as the legal adviser of the Department of State. Robert C. Post was selected to replace him as dean of the law school.

In 2022, two federal appeals judges, James C. Ho and Elizabeth L. Branch, stopped hiring Yale Law graduates as clerks because of concerns that the school suppresses conservative views. The school responded by initiating actions to "reaffirm its commitment to free speech", which included an orientation about "free expression" and "respectful engagement", the appointment of a new dean to help law students "resolve disagreements", and a prohibition on secret recordings and disruption of campus events.

== Academics ==
=== Culture ===
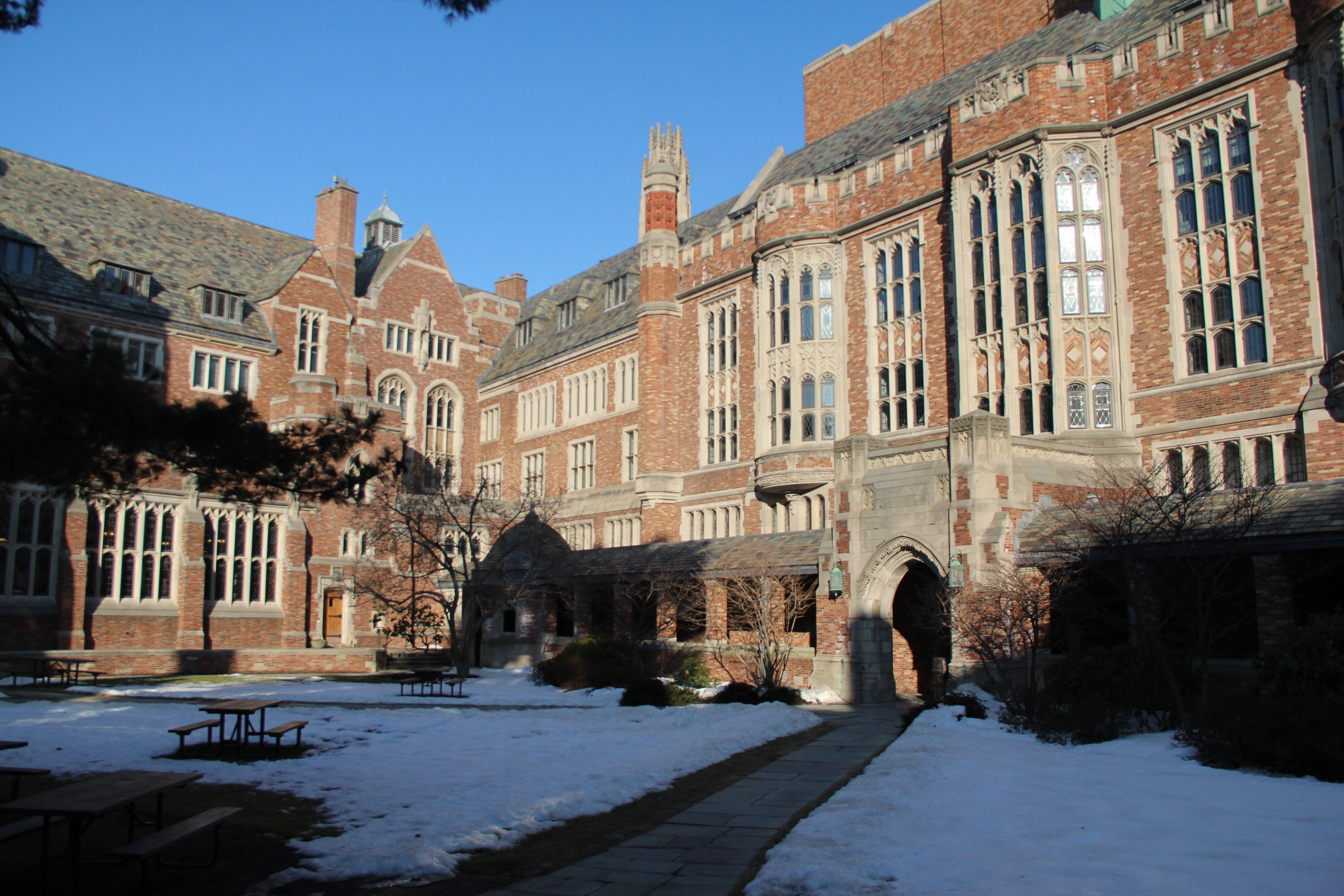
Yale Law School is housed in the Sterling Law Building, erected in 1931. Modeled after the English Inns of Court, the building is located at the center of Yale's campus and contains a law library, a dining hall, and a courtyard.

The institution is known for its scholarly orientation; a relatively large number of its graduates (9%) choose careers in academia within five years of graduation, while a relatively low number (46%) choose to work in law firms five years after graduation. Another feature of Yale Law's culture since the 1930s, among both faculty and student graduates, has been an emphasis on the importance of spending at least a few years in government service. A similar emphasis has long been placed on service as a judicial law clerk upon graduation. Its 4.5:1 student-to-faculty ratio is the lowest among U.S. law schools.

Yale Law does not have a traditional grading system, a consequence of student unrest in the late 1960s. Instead, it grades first-semester first-year students on a simple Credit/No Credit system. For their remaining two-and-a-half years, students are graded on an Honors/Pass/Low Pass/Fail system. Similarly, the school does not rank its students. It is also notable for having only a single semester of required classes (plus two additional writing requirements), instead of the full year most U.S. schools require. Unusually, and as a result of unique Connecticut State court rules, Yale Law allows first-year students to represent clients through one of its numerous clinics; other law schools typically offer this opportunity only to second- and third-year students.

Students publish nine law journals that, unlike those at most other schools, mostly accept student editors without a competition. The only exception is YLS's flagship journal, the Yale Law Journal, which holds a two-part admissions competition each spring, consisting of a four- or five-hour "bluebooking exam," followed by a traditional writing competition. Although the Journal identifies a target maximum number of members to accept each year, it is not a firm number. Other leading student-edited publications include the Yale Journal on Regulation, the Yale Law & Policy Review, and the Yale Journal of International Law.

In November 2013, it was announced that a $25 million donation would bring student dormitory living back onto campus, with renovations to begin in 2018.

=== Rankings ===
Yale Law was ranked the number one law school in the United States by U.S. News & World Report from 1990 until 2026, when it lost the top spot to Stanford Law School. Among U.S. law schools, Yale has the lowest acceptance rate and the highest yield rate—whereas less than 5% of applicants are admitted, about 80% of those who are accepted ultimately enroll, either in the Fall following their acceptance or after a deferral. Since its inception in 2018, with Yale Law School securing the top position, the Fortuna Ranking of US Law School Rankings has consistently placed Yale at #1, while Harvard and Stanford have maintained their positions as #2 and #3 respectively in the latest 2023-2024 ranking. The school also saw a greater percentage of its students go on to become Supreme Court clerks between the 2000 and 2010 terms than any other law school, more than double the percentage of the second-highest law school (Harvard Law School). Additionally, a 2010 survey of "scholarly impact," measured by per capita citations to faculty scholarship, found Yale's faculty to be the most cited law school faculty in the United States.

In November 2022, Yale made a voluntary decision to pull out of the U.S. News & World Report Best Law Schools rankings. Describing their methodology as "profoundly flawed," Yale claimed that the rankings discourage low-income applicants and "fail to advance the legal profession" by devaluing programs that encourage public interest profession rather than high-paying corporate jobs. Yale's decision was followed by Harvard Law School, which also withdrew from the rankings.

=== Admissions ===
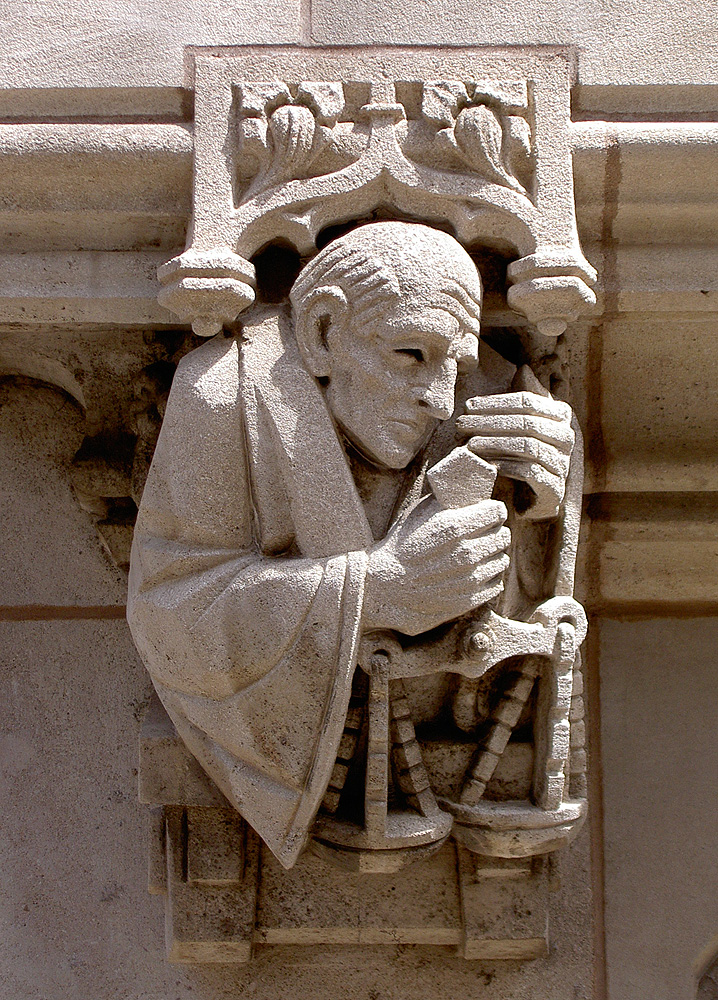
Sculptural ornamentation on the Sterling Law Building

Yale Law School enrolls about 200 new students a year, creating one of the smallest classes among top U.S. law schools. Its small class size and prestige combine to make its admissions process the most competitive in the United States. In 2023, the median GPA for the entering class was 3.96, and the median LSAT score was 175.

After an initial round of screening by the admissions department, approximately 25% of applications are independently evaluated by three different faculty members. Each application is scored from 2–4 at the discretion of the reader. All applicants with a perfect 12 (i.e., a 4 from all three faculty members) are admitted, upon which they are immediately notified by the school. There are also 50–80 outstanding students admitted each year without going through this review process.

The LL.M. Program and the Visiting Researchers Program at Yale Law are amongst the smallest and most selective graduate law programs in the United States. Yale Law admits around 25 LL.M. students and around 10 visiting researchers every year. These programs are usually limited to those students who intend to pursue a career in legal academia.

Admission to the J.S.D. program at Yale law school is exclusive. Candidates in exceptional standing who exhibited promise of delivering outstanding scholarly contributions, and who possess an L.L.M. degree take priority.

Yale Law admitted only men until 1918.

=== Clinical programs ===
Yale Law School houses over two dozen clinics that allow students to represent clients in real-world legal problems. Participation in clinics is common among Yale Law students, with over 80% of degree candidates participating in clinical activities prior to graduation.

Yale Law's clinics cover a wide range of issue areas and legal fields. Students represent clients before courts at all levels of the federal judiciary, state courts in Connecticut and other states, international tribunals and adjudicative bodies, administrative processes, and private arbitration. Yale Law School has greatly expanded its clinical programs in recent years, adding eight new clinics during the 2016–2017 academic year.

=== Summer school with Paris-Panthéon-Assas University ===
Yale Law School signed in June 2011 an Agreement for Collaborative Activities to create an environment for long-term joint research, exchange and programming activities, with Paris-Panthéon-Assas University, the direct inheritor of the Faculty of Law of Paris and acting law school of the Sorbonne University. They organize, together with the ESSEC Business School, a summer school in law and economics, the Yale-Paris II-Essec Summer School.

=== Centers and workshops ===
- The Paul Tsai China Center
- Yale Law School Center for the Study of Corporate Law
- Center for Global Legal Challenges
- Cultural Cognition Project
- Debating Law and Religion Series
- Yale Center for Environmental Law and Policy
- Yale Law School Center for Global Legal Challenges
- Global Health Justice Partnership
- Gruber Program for Global Justice and Women's Rights
- Human Rights Workshop: Current Issues & Events
- Information Society Project
- The Justice Collaboratory
- Abdallah S. Kamel Center for the Study of Islamic Law and Civilization
- Knight Law & Media Program
- Yale Law School Latin American Legal Studies
- Yale Center for Law and Philosophy
- Law, Economics & Organization Workshop
- Law, Ethics, & Animals Program
- Legal History Forum
- Legal Theory Workshop
- The Arthur Liman Public Interest Program
- Middle East Legal Studies Seminar
- John M. Olin Center for Law, Economics and Public Policy
- Yale Law School Center for the Study of Private Law
- Quinnipiac-Yale Dispute Resolution Workshop
- Program for the Study of Reproductive Justice
- Robina Foundation Human Rights Fellowship Initiative
- Solomon Center for Health Law & Policy
- The Oscar M. Ruebhausen Fund
- Orville H. Schell, Jr. Center for International Human Rights
- Workshop on Chinese Legal Reform
- Tech Accountability & Competition Project

=== Cost and employment ===
The total cost of attendance (indicating the cost of tuition, fees, and living expenses) at Yale Law School for the 2021–2022 academic year is $93,923. In 2015, the Law School Transparency estimated debt-financed cost of attendance (including cost of living) for three years is $289,879. According to Law School Data, the average student who borrowed money to attend Yale Law School in the graduating class of 2022 graduated with $143,437 in debt.

The annual total cost of attendance (indicating the cost of tuition, fees, mandatory university health insurance, and living expenses) at Yale Law School for the 2021–2022 academic year was $93,821.

According to Yale Law School's official 2013 ABA-required disclosures, 78.8% of the Class of 2013 accepted full-time, long-term, JD-required employment nine months after graduation, excluding solo-practitioners. Yale Law School's Law School Transparency under-employment score is 8.4%, indicating the percentage of the Class of 2013 unemployed, pursuing an additional degree, or working in a non-professional, short-term, or part-time job nine months after graduation.

The median salary for a class of 2021 graduate 10 months after graduation was $94,000. and the mean salary for a class of 2021 graduate 10 months after graduation was $136,943.

ABA employment summary for 2014 graduates
Employment status	Percentage
Employed – bar passage required	73.48%
Employed – J.D. advantage	14.78%
Employed – professional position	3.04%
Employed – non-professional position	0.0%
Employed – undeterminable	0.0%
Pursuing graduate degree full-time	4.35%
Unemployed – start date deferred	1.74%
Unemployed – not seeking	1.3%
Unemployed – seeking	.87%
Employment status unknown	0.43%
Total of 203 graduates

The law school was ranked #17 of all law schools nationwide by the National Law Journal, in terms of sending the highest percentage of 2015 graduates to the largest 100 law firms in the US (23.58%).

== People ==
=== Deans ===
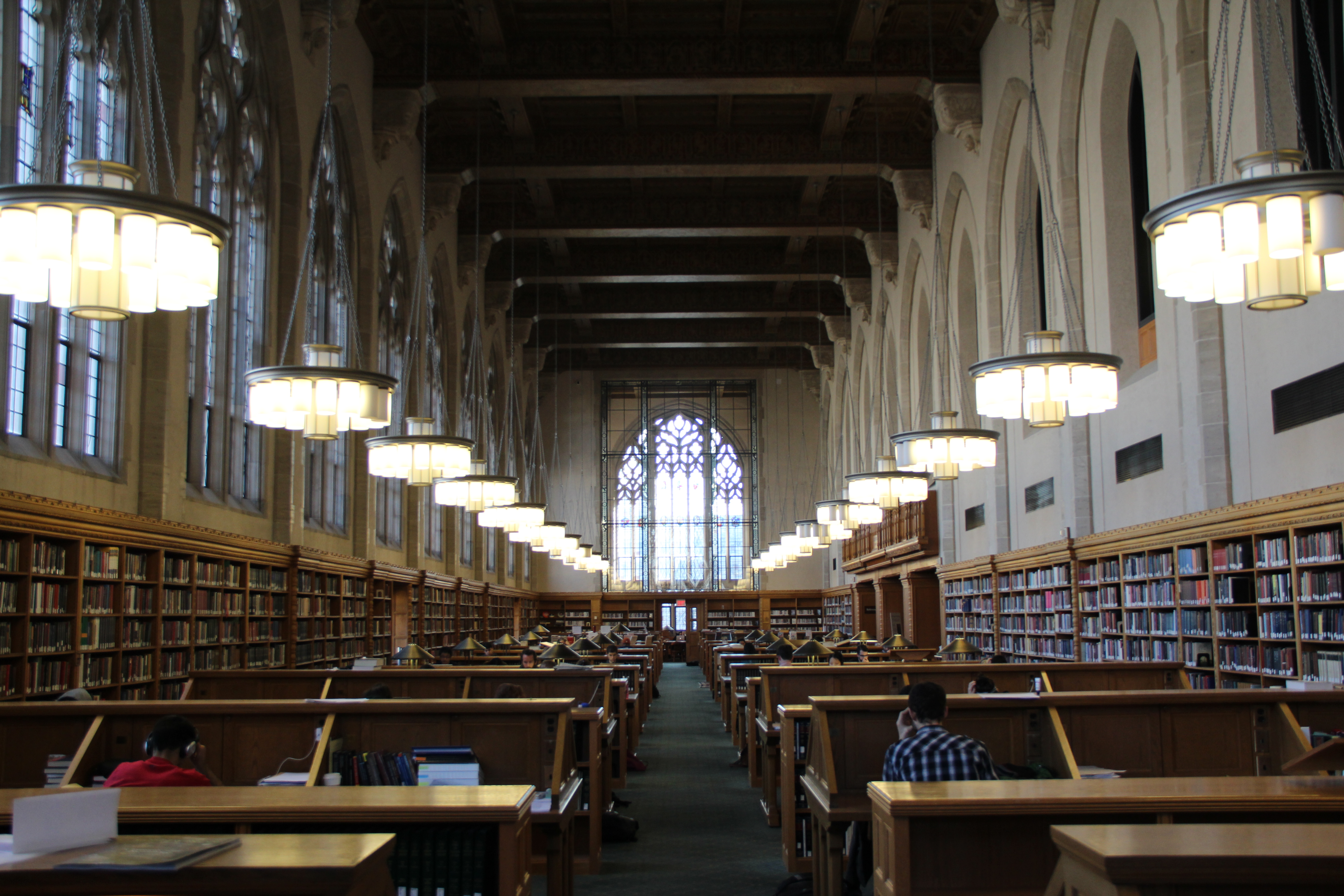
Reading room of the Lillian Goldman Law Library, which serves as the law school's library

1. 1873–1903 Francis Wayland III
2. 1903–1916 Henry Wade Rogers
3. 1916–1927 Thomas Walter Swan
4. 1927–1929 Robert Maynard Hutchins
5. 1929–1939 Charles Edward Clark
6. 1940–1946 Ashbel Green Gulliver
7. 1946–1954 Wesley Alba Sturges
8. 1954–1955 Harry Shulman
9. 1955–1965 Eugene Victor Rostow
10. 1965–1970 Louis Heilprin Pollak
11. 1970–1975 Abraham Samuel Goldstein
12. 1975–1985 Harry Hillel Wellington
13. 1985–1994 Guido Calabresi
14. 1994–2004 Anthony Kronman
15. 2004–2009 Harold Hongju Koh
16. 2009–2017 Robert C. Post
17. 2017–2025 Heather K. Gerken
18. 2026– Cristina M. Rodríguez

=== Current notable faculty ===
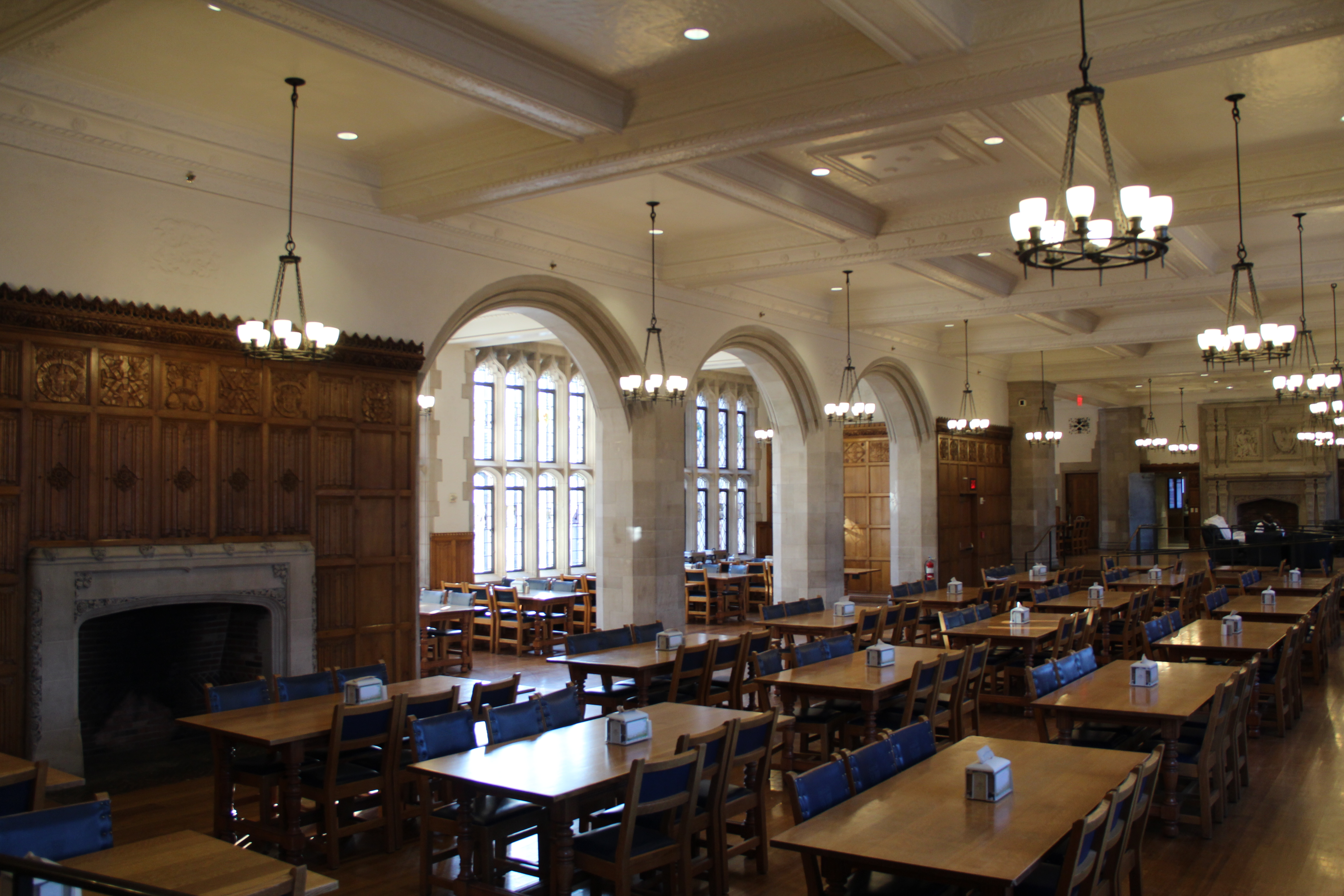
Derald H. Ruttenberg Dining Hall at Yale Law School

- Bruce Ackerman, constitutional and political science scholar, op-ed writer, and Sterling Professor
- Anne L. Alstott, tax scholar
- Akhil Reed Amar, leading constitutional law scholar, writer and consultant for the television show The West Wing, and Sterling Professor
- Ian Ayres, law and economics scholar, author of Why Not? and frequent commentator on NPR's Marketplace program
- Jack Balkin, First Amendment scholar, legal blogger, founder and director of the Yale Information Society Project
- Lea Brilmayer, expert in international law, conflict of laws, and personal jurisdiction
- Guido Calabresi, judge on the United States Court of Appeals for the Second Circuit, Sterling Professor, and former dean of Yale Law School
- Lincoln Caplan, author, journalist, Truman Capote Visiting Lecturer in Law and Senior Research Scholar in Law
- Stephen L. Carter, William Nelson Cromwell Professor of Law and author of a number of books, including the novel The Emperor of Ocean Park
- Amy Chua, international affairs scholar and author of Battle Hymn of the Tiger Mother and World on Fire: How Exporting Free Market Democracy Breeds Ethnic Hatred and Global Instability
- Mirjan Damaška, Sterling Professor, comparative criminal law scholar, and advisor to various international tribunals, including the International Criminal Tribunal for the former Yugoslavia and the International Court of Justice
- Justin Driver, constitutional and education law scholar
- Robert Ellickson, property and land use law scholar
- William Eskridge, constitutional law scholar, legislation and statutory interpretation scholar, and one of the most cited law professors in the U.S.
- Daniel C. Esty, environmental law and policy expert, former commissioner of the Connecticut Department of Energy and Environmental Protection, and director of the Yale Center for Environmental Law and Policy
- Owen M. Fiss, liberalism and free speech scholar and Sterling Professor
- Claudia Flores, human rights scholar
- James Forman Jr., leading criminal law scholar and Pulitzer Prize recipient
- Heather K. Gerken, election law, federalism, and constitutional law scholar
- Paul Gewirtz, constitutional scholar and U.S.-China expert
- Abbe Gluck, health law and statutory interpretation scholar
- Linda Greenhouse, Pulitzer Prize-winning author and New York Times correspondent covering the Supreme Court of the United States for more than 30 years
- Henry B. Hansmann, law and economics scholar, and leading theorist on organizational ownership and design
- Oona Hathaway, international law scholar and president-elect of the American Society of International Law
- Elizabeth Hinton, legal historian
- Christine Jolls, law and behavioral economics scholar, employment law scholar
- Dan M. Kahan, criminal law and evidence scholar, director of the Supreme Court Advocacy Clinic
- Paul W. Kahn, constitutional law and human rights scholar
- Harold Hongju Koh, international law expert, former dean of the law school, former legal adviser of the Department of State, and Sterling Professor
- Anthony Kronman, Sterling Professor and leading scholar on contracts, bankruptcy, jurisprudence, social theory, and professional responsibility
- John Langbein, legal historian and trusts and estates scholar
- Yair Listokin, law and economics scholar
- Jonathan R. Macey, corporate/banking law scholar
- Daniel Markovits, law and philosophy scholar
- Jerry L. Mashaw, administrative law scholar and Sterling Professor
- Tracey Meares, criminal law scholar
- John D. Morley, corporate and business law scholar
- Samuel Moyn, international law and human rights scholar, constitutional law scholar, and legal historian
- Douglas NeJaime, family law and legal ethics scholar
- Robert C. Post, constitutional law scholar with a particular focus on the First Amendment and equal protection
- Judith Resnik, civil procedure and criminal scholar
- Cristina M. Rodríguez, constitutional scholar, administrative scholar, and former co-chair of the Presidential Commission on the Supreme Court of the United States
- Roberta Romano, corporate law scholar, and first female Sterling Professor at Yale Law School
- Susan Rose-Ackerman, administrative law and law and economics scholar
- Jed Rubenfeld, constitutional theorist and criminal law scholar
- Scott J. Shapiro, legal philosopher
- Reva Siegel, constitutional law scholar with a particular focus on social movements and equality
- Kate Stith, constitutional law and criminal procedure expert
- Tom R. Tyler, law and psychology expert
- James Q. Whitman, comparative law scholar and legal historian
- Keith Whittington, constitutional law scholar
- Michael Wishnie, clinical professor, expert on immigration
- John Fabian Witt, legal historian
- Stephen Wizner, William O. Douglas Clinical Professor of Law
- Taisu Zhang, legal historian and comparative law scholar
