= The Yale Law Journal =

- Discipline: Legal studies
- Language: English
- Edited by: Shyam Praful Madhani

Publication details
- History: 1891–present
- Publisher: The Yale Law Journal Company, Inc. (United States)
- Frequency: 8/year
- Impact factor: 5.000 (2018)

Standard abbreviations
- Bluebook: Yale L.J.
- ISO 4: Yale Law J.

Indexing
- ISSN: 0044-0094 (print); 1939-8611 (web)
- JSTOR: 00440094

Links
- Journal homepage

The Yale Law Journal (YLJ) is a student-run law review affiliated with Yale Law School. Published continuously since 1891, it is the most widely known of the eight law reviews published by students at Yale Law School. The journal is one of the most cited legal publications in the United States (with an impact factor of 5.000) and is in the top four for the number of citations per published article.

The journal, which is published eight times per year, contains articles, essays, features, and book reviews by professional legal scholars as well as student-written notes and comments. It is edited entirely by students. The journal has an online companion, the Yale Law Journal Forum, which features shorter pieces and responses from scholars, practitioners, and policymakers.

The Yale Law Journal, in conjunction with the Harvard Law Review, the Columbia Law Review, and the University of Pennsylvania Law Review, publishes The Bluebook: A Uniform System of Citation, the most widely followed authority for legal citation formats in the United States.

== Notable alumni ==
Alumni of The Yale Law Journal have served at all levels of the federal judiciary. Alumni include Supreme Court justices (Samuel Alito, Abe Fortas, Brett Kavanaugh, Sonia Sotomayor, Potter Stewart) and numerous judges on the United States courts of appeals (Duane Benton, Stephanos Bibas, Guido Calabresi, Steven Colloton, Morton Ira Greenberg, Stephen A. Higginson, Andrew D. Hurwitz, Robert Katzmann, Scott Matheson, William J. Nardini, Michael H. Park, Jill A. Pryor, Richard G. Taranto, Patricia Wald, Cory T. Wilson).

Alumni have also served as United States Attorneys General (Nicholas Katzenbach, Peter Keisler) and United States Solicitors General (Walter E. Dellinger III, Neal Katyal, Seth P. Waxman). In addition, numerous editors have gone on to serve as high-ranking public officials (Senator Arlen Specter, Senator Michael Bennet, Senator Richard Blumenthal, former Secretary of Labor Robert Reich, Secretary of Health and Human Services Alex Azar, FBI Director Christopher A. Wray, White House Counsel Lloyd Cutler, National Security Advisor John R. Bolton, Vice President JD Vance).

Former editors also include prominent law professors (Matthew Adler, Akhil Amar, Ian Ayres, Barbara A. Babcock, Philip Bobbitt, Stephen L. Carter, Alan Dershowitz, John Hart Ely, Noah Feldman, Claire Finkelstein, Joseph Goldstein, Dawn Johnsen, Randall Kennedy, Karl Llewellyn, Jonathan R. Macey, Charles A. Reich, Reva Siegel, John Yoo, and Kenji Yoshino); Nobel Laureate Michael Woodford; and current or former deans of Yale Law School (Robert Post and Louis H. Pollak, who was also dean of the University of Pennsylvania Law School), Harvard Law School (Martha Minow), Columbia Law School (David Schizer), Brooklyn Law School (Joan Wexler), Northwestern University School of Law (David E. Van Zandt), Bates College (Clayton Spencer), Michigan Law School (Evan Caminker), New York University School of Law (Richard Revesz), Georgetown Law Center (T. Alexander Aleinikoff), Emory University School of Law (Robert A. Schapiro), Washington and Lee University School of Law (Nora Demleitner), and Stanford Law School (Bayless Manning).

== Notable articles ==
- Hohfeld, Wesley N. (1913). "Some Fundamental Legal Conceptions as Applied in Judicial Reasoning" (PDF). The Yale Law Journal. 23 (1): 16–59. doi:10.2307/785533. JSTOR 785533.
- Llewellyn, Karl N. (1931). "What Price Contract?—An Essay in Perspective". The Yale Law Journal. 40 (5): 704–751. doi:10.2307/790659. JSTOR 790659. S2CID 54089931.
- Douglas, William O.; Bates, George E. (1933). "The Federal Securities Act of 1933". The Yale Law Journal. 43 (2): 171–217. doi:10.2307/791346. JSTOR 791346.
- Lasswell, Harold D.; McDougal, Myres S. (1943). "Legal Education and Public Policy: Professional Training in the Public Interest". The Yale Law Journal. 52 (2): 203–295. doi:10.2307/792244. JSTOR 792244.
- Prosser, William L. (1960). "The Assault upon the Citadel (Strict Liability to the Consumer)". The Yale Law Journal. 69 (7): 1099–1148. doi:10.2307/794385. JSTOR 794385. S2CID 158447444.
- Calabresi, Guido (1961). "Some Thoughts on Risk Distribution and the Law of Torts". The Yale Law Journal. 70 (1): 499–553. doi:10.2307/794261. JSTOR 794261.
- Reich, Charles A. (1964). "The New Property" (PDF). The Yale Law Journal. 73 (5): 733–787. doi:10.2307/794645. JSTOR 794645.
- Ely, John Hart (1973). "The Wages of Crying Wolf: A Comment on Roe v. Wade" (PDF). The Yale Law Journal. 82 (5): 920–949. doi:10.2307/795536. JSTOR 795536. PMID 11663374.
- Easterbrook, Frank H.; Fischel, Daniel R. (1982). "Corporate Control Transactions". The Yale Law Journal. 91 (4): 698–737. doi:10.2307/796036. JSTOR 796036.
- Ackerman, Bruce A. (1984). "The Storrs Lectures: Discovering the Constitution". The Yale Law Journal. 93 (6): 1013–1072. doi:10.2307/796204. JSTOR 796204.
- Fiss, Owen (1984). "Against Settlement". The Yale Law Journal. 93 (6): 1073–1090. doi:10.2307/796205.
- Alito, Samuel A. Jr. (1974). "The 'Released Time Cases' Revisited: A Study of Group Decisionmaking by the Supreme Court". The Yale Law Journal. 83 (6): 1202–1236. doi:10.2307/795480. JSTOR 795480.
- Sotomayor, Sonia (1979). "Statehood and the Equal Footing Doctrine: The Case for Puerto Rican Seabed Rights". The Yale Law Journal. 88 (4): 825–849. doi:10.2307/795781. JSTOR 795781.
