= Theodore Hope (lawyer) =

American lawyer

Theodore S. Hope Jr. (1903–1998) was a corporate lawyer in New York City for over 50 years.

== Ancestry ==
Theodore Hope Sr., was a New York University Delta Upsilon graduate with a Bachelor of Science in 1892, and was a New York City attorney in the late 19th century and early 20th century. His wife, Winifred (Ayres) Hope, was one of the founding members and Vice-President of the "College Club" of Ridgewood, New Jersey, where they resided in 1913.

Winifred Ayres was the second of four daughters born to father Marshall Ayres Jr. of Griggsville, Illinois, whose grandparents were Marshall Ayres and Hannah (Lombard) Ayers, natives of Truro, Massachusetts, on Cape Cod, and whose ancestors came to North America on the Mayflower. Winifred's grandfather Marshall was one of the pioneer residents of Griggsville in 1821. Her father, Marshall Jr., after being raised in Griggsville, went to Boston to attend Harvard University in 1860, graduating with honors in 1863.

After graduation, Marshall Jr. went to New York City as a financier in the oil industry. He partnered with Josiah Lombard to create the Lombard, Ayres & Company. The Lombard, Ayers & Co. became extremely successful, and both partners very rich. In a Chicago wedding, Marshall Jr. married Louise Sanderson, daughter of Levi Sanderson, who was one of the founders of Galesburg, Illinois.

Louise and Marshall Jr. had four children, but she died on August 2, 1886. Marshall Jr. then married Frances N. Nobel of Provincetown, Massachusetts, and retired in 1900 to Newbury, New Hampshire. Marshall Jr. died August 15, 1905.

== Career ==
Theodore S. Hope Jr., was a 1925 Columbia Law graduate, and then assistant professor of law at Columbia through 1929. His contributions to law include:

- He was on the Editorial Board for the Columbia Law Review 1928-1929.
- Co-author with William Underhill Moore of "An Institutional Approach to the Law of Commercial Banking", Yale Law Journal, 1929, an explanation and prediction of banking law decisions that "did not appear to derive from existing legal rules by determining the extent to which the facts of the case deviated from normal banking practice."
- Co-author with William Underhill Moore of "Legal and institutional methods applied to the debating of direct discounts." 1931.
- Co-author with Herman Oliphant of "Study of Day Calendars" 1932, an in-depth look into how time affects trial cases.
- Part of the legal team for United States vs. Curtiss-Wright Export Corp. U.S. Supreme Court Case 98.,

1936.

- In 1940, he was appointed assistant professor at the Cornell Law School.
- In 1947, he was part of the five man legal team representing the U.S. film industries' interests vs. Denmark's government.
- He developed an institutional approach to the law of commercial banking as described in his published essay on the subject in the book American Legal Theory (The International Library of Essays in Law and Legal Theory. Schools, No 6), 1944.
- Later in his career he worked for the Wall Street firm of Donovan Leisure Newton & Irvine.
- He assisted in the writing of "A History of William Morris's Typographical Adventure", by William S. Peterson, 1988.

== Personal life ==
Theodore died at the age of 95 in Danbury, on October 9, 1998. Hope's only son, Peter Blanchard Hope (born in 1935), is a graduate of Harvard University and Columbia Medical School. He served in the Army during his residency and eventually settled down a few towns over from Danbury in Sandwich, New Hampshire where he practiced family medicine, had six children, and became very active in the hiking and preservation community of New Hampshire. Peter now lives in Grantham, New Hampshire and as a Green Mountain Club member, he organized hikes through the Hope Forest. He was Excursions Co-Chair for the New Hampshire chapter of the Appalachian Mountain Club, and he was Chair of the New Hampshire Sierra Club Outings.

=== The Hope Forest ===
In 1987, Theodore S. Hope Jr. and his wife Emily Blanchard Hope, who retired to Danbury, New Hampshire after practicing corporate law in New York City for over 50 years, donated 482 acres (195 ha) of land to the New England Forestry Foundation. In 1991, ownership of 376 acres (152 ha) of the donated land was transferred to the Society for the Protection of New Hampshire Forests and named the Emily & Theodore Hope Forest.
