= Thomas C. Grey =

American academic

Thomas C. Grey is the Nelson Bowman Sweitzer and Marie B. Sweitzer Professor of Law, emeritus, at Stanford Law School. As a legal theorist and a historian of modern American legal thought, Grey has written widely on pragmatism, legal formalism, legal realism, and the jurisprudence of Oliver Wendell Holmes Jr.

== Education ==
Grey attended Phillips Exeter Academy, then received his Bachelor of Arts from Stanford University in 1963 and a Bachelor of Arts from Oxford University in 1965, where he studied as a Marshall Scholar. Grey received his Bachelor of Laws from Yale Law School in 1968. He also holds an honorary doctorate from the Chicago-Kent College of Law.

== Early professional career ==
Following law school, Grey clerked for Judge J. Skelly Wright of the United States Court of Appeals for the District of Columbia Circuit and for Justice Thurgood Marshall of the Supreme Court of the United States. Grey also worked as a staff attorney at the Washington Research Project in Washington, D.C.

== Academic career ==
Grey joined the faculty of Stanford Law School in 1971. At Stanford, Grey taught Torts to first-year law students for over 30 years.

Grey's scholarship has been published in many leading law journals, including the Yale Law Journal, Stanford Law Review, Columbia Law Review, NYU Law Review, and California Law Review, among others. His 1975 law review article, Do We Have an Unwritten Constitution?, published in Volume 27 of the Stanford Law Review, is the 55th most-cited law review article of all time.

== Personal life ==
Grey married Cathryn Stevenson, a Stanford classmate and fellow philosophy major. She also graduated from the Yale Law School in 1968, but then decided to become a doctor and ultimately graduated from the Stanford University Medical School and practiced medicine. The couple had one daughter. They later divorced amicably, and Cathryn ultimately died of breast cancer. Grey was married to Barbara Allen Babcock, the Judge John Crown Professor of Law, emerita, at Stanford Law School, until her death in April 2020. He has a daughter and a granddaughter.

== Books ==
- Thomas C. Grey (editor). The Legal Enforcement of Morality. New York: Alfred Knopf, 1983.
- Thomas C. Grey. The Wallace Stevens Case: Law and the Practice of Poetry. Cambridge: Harvard University Press, 1991.
- Thomas C. Grey, Robert C. Post, K. Anthony Appiah, Judith Butler, and Reva B. Siegel. Prejudicial Appearances: The Logic of American Antidiscrimination Law. Durham: Duke University Press, 2001.
- Thomas C. Grey. Formalism and Pragmatism in American Law. Boston: Brill Academic Publishing, 2014.

== See also ==
- List of law clerks for the tenth seat of the Supreme Court of the United States
