= Marshall Ayres Jr. =

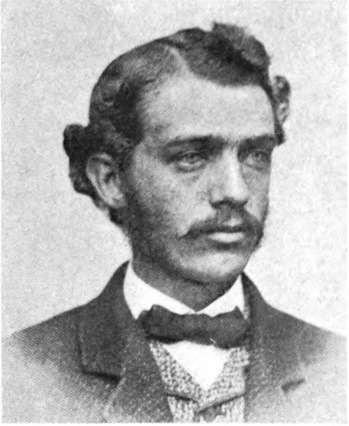
Harvard class photo - 1863

Marshall Ayres Jr. (1839–1906) was an American industrial financier.

== Personal life ==
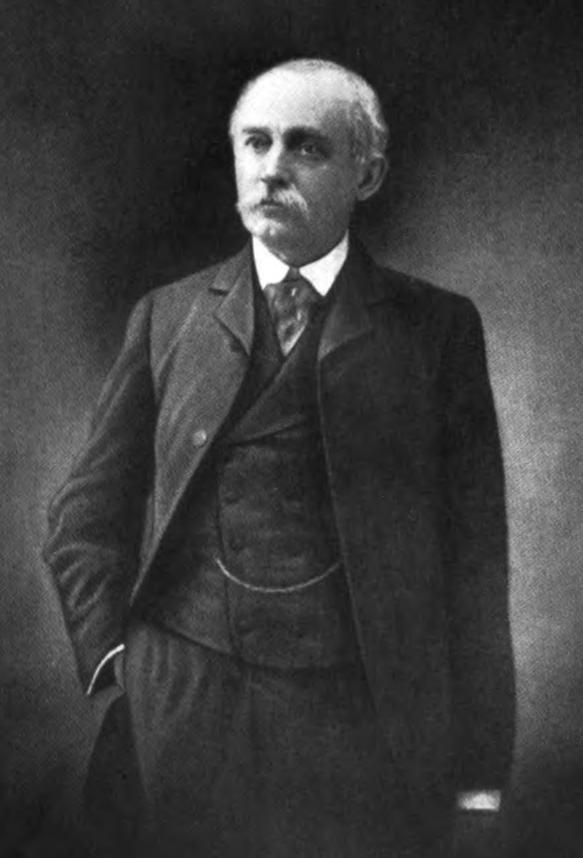
Marshall Ayres Jr. -ca. 1900

Marshall Ayres Jr. was born on February 20, 1839, in Griggsville, Illinois, to father Marshall Ayres and mother Hannah (Lombard) Ayers, who were native to Truro, Massachusetts, on Cape Cod. Their ancestors came over on the Mayflower, and his Ayres' father, Marshall, was one of the pioneer residents of Griggsville, moving there in 1821. Marshall Jr., was raised in Griggsville and schooled locally by a Harvard graduate. He first ventured out to Chicago to work in a bank. At the age of 16, in 1855, then again in 1857, he went to the Boston prep school, William Brooks. His last year before entering college, he was home-schooled with his cousin and future business partner, Josiah Lombard, by the Yale graduate, Rev. Henry M. Tupper. At the age of 21, he realized the necessity of a good education, and went to Boston in 1860 to attend Harvard University, graduating with honors in 1863. After graduation he went back to Chicago for the next four years, where he met his future wife.

On June 11, 1868, in a Chicago wedding, Ayres, age 29, married Louise Adelaide Sanderson, age 23 (1845–1886), daughter of Levi Sanderson, who was one of the founders of Galesburg, Illinois. After the wedding the two headed for New York City to start their family.

Louise and Marshall Jr. had four daughters: Mary, born just a year after they were married, Winnifred, Marjorie, and Mildred. Their only son, Charles, died at the age of one. Louise died on August 2, 1886, at the age of 38, leaving Marshall to raise two teenage daughters and the others only 12 and 6 years old.

Just two years later, on October 30, 1889, Ayres married a girl twenty years younger, Frances Hastings Nobel (1852–1915) of Provincetown, Massachusetts, daughter of Rev. Edward Wolcott Noble of Cambridge. Together they set went on a nine-month extended journey through Europe, visiting France, Italy, Switzerland, Germany, England and Scotland.

In 1900, at the age of 61, Ayres retired to the shores of Lake Sunapee, in Newbury, New Hampshire. He died of heart disease August 12, 1906, in the town of Newbury.

His second of four daughters, Winifred Ayres, married the well-known New York lawyer Theodore S. Hope.

== Business ==
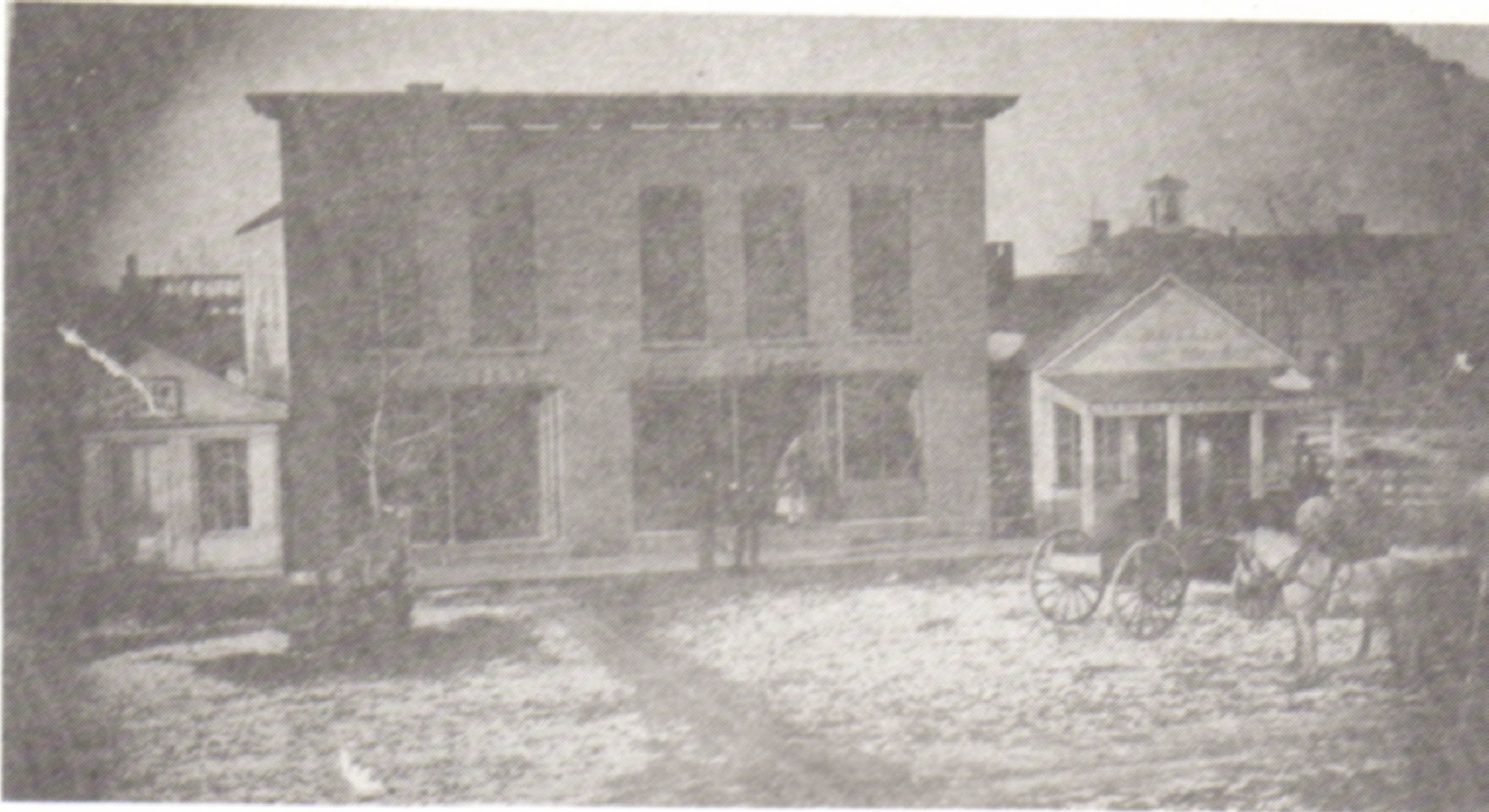
Ayres & Lombard Bank & Store-Griggsville, IL 1847

After graduation, Ayres went to New York as a financier in the oil industry. In 1869, he partnered with cousin, friend, and classmate Josiah Lombard to create the Lombard, Stevens & Co., then the Lombard & Ayres, and finally the Lombard, Ayres & Company. The two families had already been successful business partners back in Illinois with the Ayres & Lombard Bank & Store, and also a steamboat ferry called Prairie State. This, at the time, was the only other oil investment company to stand out against the giant Standard Oil Company. Lombard, Ayers & Co. then consolidated with the Tide Water Oil Company, which later became part of ExxonMobil. Lombard, Ayers & Co. became extremely successful, and both partners became very rich.

In 1887, they built the 20,000 square feet (1,900 m^{2}) corporate vacation home Villa Maria Water Mill, Long Island, where the two families could relax for the summer, but Ayres' wife Louise died in September and never got to enjoy it.

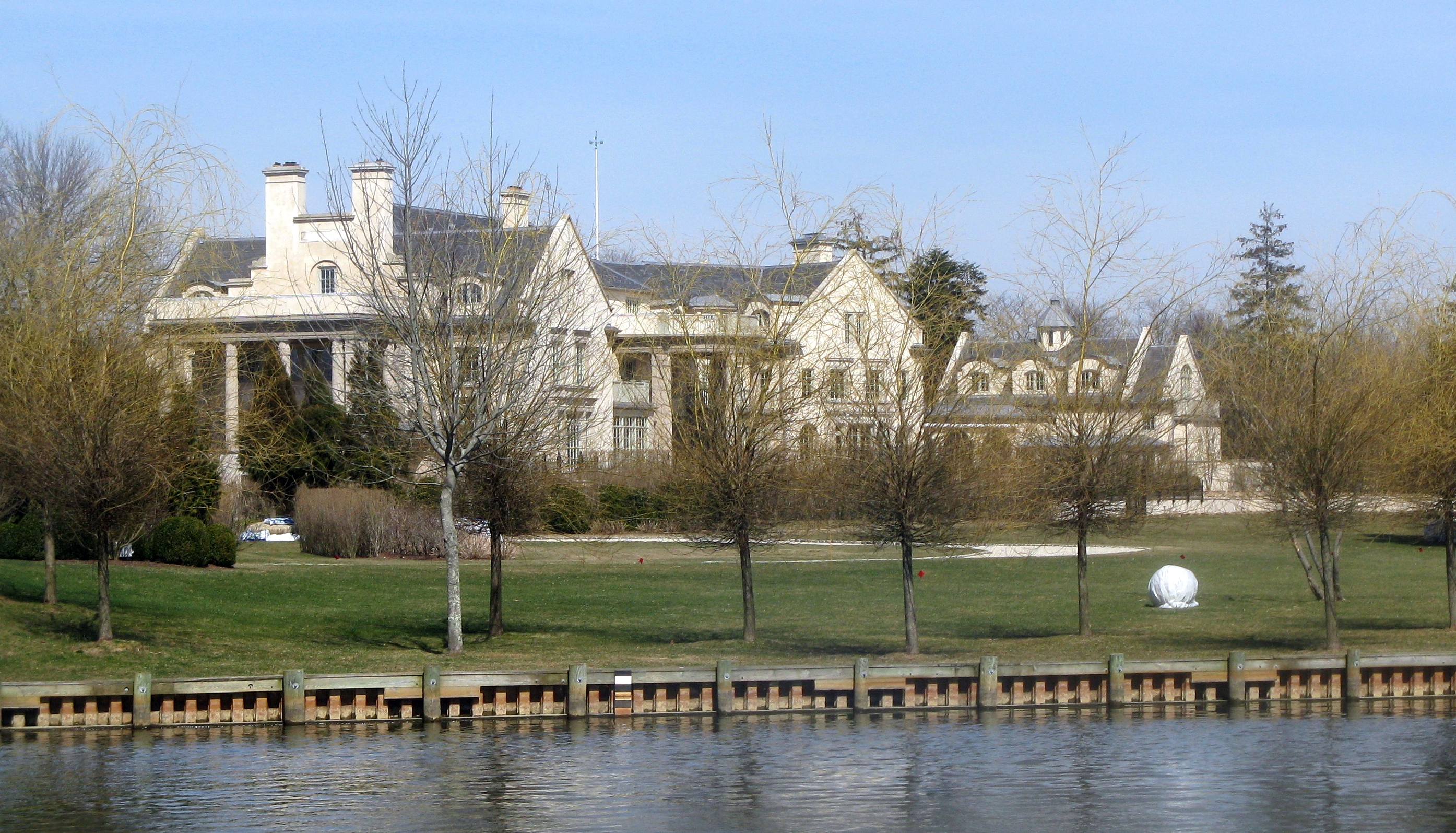
Villa Maria on Long Island

In 1888, Lombard, Ayers & Co. became one of the incorporators of Tide Water Oil Company, which also absorbed three smaller oil houses. In 1889 the company was sold to Tide Water Oil Co.

For the next 6 years Ayres became Vice President and New York manager of the Elwell Mercantile Company that mainly did business in Santiago de Cuba.

In 1891, the company Lombard & Ayres was worth $1,250,000 and owned the Seaboard Lumber Company, and were heavy exporters of oil to Mexico where they had refineries in Veracruz and San Luis Potosí.

In 1893, still acting as a separate company under the Tide Water Oil Company, Lombard & Ayres transferred its form from a corporation to a copartnership.

In 1894, the Lombard & Ayres company was worth $1,000,000, as the majority of its wealth was kept in the Phenix National Bank in London, where Lombard was the Director. The company also owned the New York, Mobile, and Mexican Steamship Company, as well as a small line in Alabama called the Seaboard Railway Company.

According to the New York Times article on December 18, 1895, Att. Randoph Parmly of 160 Broadway St. in New York was appointed receiver. The law firm Marsten & Nichols handled the transaction, as Josiah Lombard and Marshall Ayres were in a "friendly" business dispute over various company handling. At the time, the firm's assets were just under a million dollars, with about $200,000 in liabilities. The major dispute was over the owning of the Seaboard Lumber Company worth about $500,000 in stock.

== Later years ==
Ayres is buried in Woodland Cemetery, Bronx, New York, alongside his business partner and cousin Josiah Lombard Jr.

Lombard read the following at their 50th Harvard class reunion on June 26, 1907: "He died as he lived, loved and respected by all who knew him."
