= Barbara A. Babcock =

American legal scholar (1938–2020)

Barbara Babcock
- Born: Barbara Allen Babcock; July 6, 1938; Washington, D.C., US
- Died: April 18, 2020 (aged 81); Stanford, California, US
- Education: University of Pennsylvania; Yale Law School
- Occupations: Law professor Author
- Spouse: Thomas C. Grey
- Website: Women's Legal History Biography Project

Barbara Allen Babcock (July 6, 1938 – April 18, 2020) was the Judge John Crown Professor of Law, Emerita, at Stanford Law School. She was an expert in criminal and civil procedure and was a member of the Stanford Law School faculty from 1972 until her death.

== Early life and education ==
Born in 1938 in Washington D.C., Barbara Babcock was raised in Hope, Arkansas, and then Hyattsville, Maryland. Inspired by the stories told by her father, Henry Allen Babcock, who was a lawyer in Arkansas, Babcock aspired at an early age to become a lawyer. In her middle school yearbook, Babcock listed becoming a lawyer as her life's ambition.

Babcock received her undergraduate degree in 1960 from the University of Pennsylvania, where she was a member of Phi Beta Kappa, a Woodrow Wilson scholar, and valedictorian of the College for Women. At Yale Law School, Babcock earned the Harlan Fiske Stone Prize for best oral argument in the first year and served as an editor of the Yale Law Journal. She graduated Order of the Coif in 1963.

== Academic and professional career ==
Following her graduation from law school, Babcock clerked for Judge Henry Edgerton of the U.S. Court of Appeals for the District of Columbia Circuit, and worked for noted criminal defense attorney Edward Bennett Williams, who founded Williams & Connolly LLP. She served as a staff attorney and then as the first director of the Public Defender Service for the District of Columbia from 1968 until 1972.

In 1972, Babcock joined the faculty of Stanford Law School. Babcock became the first woman appointed to the regular faculty, the first woman to hold an endowed chair, and the first professor emerita. While she also received offers to join the faculties of Harvard Law School and Yale Law School, Babcock preferred Stanford's campus, climate, and culture. During the Carter Administration, Babcock took leave from Stanford to serve as assistant attorney general for the Civil Division in the U.S. Department of Justice.

Babcock was known nationwide for her research on the history of women in the legal profession and, in particular, for her biography of California's first woman lawyer and founder of the public defender, Clara Shortridge Foltz (Woman Lawyer: The Trials of Clara Foltz, Stanford University Press, 2011). The book received positive reviews from Dahlia Lithwick, who described the book as a "riveting," "unforgettable tale," and from U.S. Supreme Court Justice Ruth Bader Ginsburg, who wrote that the book was "a powerful reminder of women's strength in the face of adversity, their will to overcome difficulties, and, together with sympathique brothers-in-law, to work toward a system of justice accessible and fair to all."

At Stanford, Babcock taught courses on Civil Procedure, Criminal Law, and Women's Legal History. Babcock also launched the Women's Legal History Project, a compilation of biographical and historical information on pioneering women lawyers. In 1975, Babcock published the nation's second casebook on sex-based discrimination and the law, and in the early 1970s, she taught the first "Women and the Law" courses at Georgetown and Yale.

A distinguished teacher, Babcock was the only four-time winner of the John Bingham Hurlbut Award for Excellence in Teaching at Stanford Law School. She also received the Society of American Law Teachers Award for Distinguished Teaching and Service. Babcock won many other honors and awards, including the American Bar Association's Margaret Brent Award, which recognizes and celebrates the accomplishments of women lawyers who have excelled in their field and have paved the way to success for other women lawyers. She also was awarded honorary degrees from the University of Puget Sound School of Law and the University of San Diego School of Law.

After retiring, Babcock continued to write and publish.

== Personal life ==
Babcock was married to Thomas C. Grey, the Nelson Bowman Sweitzer and Marie B. Sweitzer Professor of Law, Emeritus, at Stanford Law School. Babcock died of breast cancer on April 18, 2020, at the age of 81 in Stanford, California.

== Key works ==
=== Clara Foltz ===
- Barbara Allen Babcock, Woman Lawyer: The Trials of Clara Foltz, Stanford University Press (2011).
- Barbara Allen Babcock, Alma Mater: Clara Foltz and Hastings College of the Law, 21 Hastings Women's Law Journal 99 (2010).
- Barbara Allen Babcock, Inventing the Public Defender, 43 American Criminal Law Review 1267 (2006). Full Text
- Barbara Allen Babcock, Women Defenders in the West, 1 University of Nevada Law Journal 1 (2001). Full Text
- Barbara Allen Babcock, 150th Anniversary of the Supreme Court, 22 Official Cal. Reports 4th 1275 -79 (2000). Full Text
- Barbara Allen Babcock, Feminist Lawyers, 50 Stanford Law Review 1689 (1998).
- Barbara Allen Babcock, Clara Shortridge Foltz: 'First Woman', 28 Valparaiso University Law Review 1231-85 (1994) (Reprint, with new introduction, from 30 Arizona Law Review 673). Full Text
- Barbara Allen Babcock, Western Women Lawyers, 45 Stanford Law Review 2179 (1993). Full Text
- Barbara Allen Babcock, Clara Shortridge Foltz: Constitution-maker, 66 Indiana Law Journal 849-940 (1991). Full Text
- Barbara Allen Babcock, Reconstructing the Person: The Case of Clara Shortridge Foltz, 12 Biography 1 (1989). Full Text

=== Works about criminal procedure and jury trials ===
- Barbara Allen Babcock, The Duty to Defend, 114 Yale Law Journal 1489 (2005). Full Text
- Barbara Allen Babcock, Preserving the Jury's Privacy, New York Times, (July 24, 2002).
- Barbara Allen Babcock, In Defense of the Criminal Jury, versions in Postmortem: the O.J. Simpson Case (Jeffrey Abramson, ed. 1996); The Legal System (Opposing Viewpoints) (Tamara Roleff, ed. 1996); "Protect the Jury System; The Judge Was The Problem, L.A. Times (Oct. 8, 1995).
- Barbara Allen Babcock, A Place in the Palladium: Women's Rights and Jury Service, 61 University of Cincinnati Law Review 1139-80 (1993).
- Barbara Allen Babcock, Jury Service and Community Representation Verdict, The Brookings Institution (1993).
- Barbara Allen Babcock, Taking the Stand, 35 William and Mary Law Review 1 (1993). Full Text
- Barbara Allen Babcock, Defending the Government, 23 John Marshall Law Review 2 (1990). Full Text
- Barbara Allen Babcock, Defending the Guilty, 32 Cleveland State Law Review 175 (1983).
- Barbara Allen Babcock, Fair Play: Evidence Favorable to An Accused and Effective Assistance of Counsel, 34 Stanford Law Review 1133 (1982). Full Text
- Barbara Allen Babcock, Gary Gilmore's Lawyers, 32 Stanford Law Review 865 (1980). Full Text
- Barbara Allen Babcock, Voir Dire: Preserving Its Wonderful Power, 27 Stanford Law Review 545 (1975). Full Text

=== Casebooks ===
- Babcock and Massaro, Civil Procedure: Cases and Problems, Aspen Law and Business, 2001): Previous Editions: Babcock and Massaro, Little Brown & Co. (1997): Carrington and Babcock (1976, 1979, 1983).
- Babcock et al., Sex Discrimination and the Law: History, Practice and Theory, Little, Brown & Co. (1976, First Ed. 1996, Second Ed.).
