= New legal realism =

School of thought in jurisprudence

New legal realism (NLR) is an emerging school of thought in American legal philosophy.

== Overview ==
Although it draws on the older legal realism from the first half of the twentieth century, new legal realism differs in important ways. Notably, it moves beyond the older field's emphasis on judges, courts, and formal legal systems. New legal realism examines law in people's everyday lives, using an interdisciplinary combination of current social science methods, including qualitative, quantitative, and experimental approaches. It is characterized by a “ground-level up” perspective, which focuses on laypeople's experiences with law as well as studying legal professionals and formal institutions. Research methods are chosen according to evolving research questions, responding to changing understandings as knowledge accumulates. This and other features of NLR fit well with the American pragmatist philosophical tradition. Some NLR scholars view their pragmatist approach as a way of bridging between more objective social science (describing how it "is') and more normative policy goals (how it "ought" to be).

In addition, NLR takes “law on the books” seriously as a subject of study, including it as part of the overall system of law. The goal of NLR is to build an integrated social science research program on law that combines multiple methods and objects of study to give policymakers the most complete possible picture of how law operates. This includes non-instrumental uses of law. Some NLR scholars have focused on how to create the best translations of social science for law, based on the idea that law has its own priorities and special language that have to be taken into account (in addition to the technical and field-specific languages and approaches of the social sciences, which also create translation challenges of their own)(see, for example, the original LSI and Wisconsin Law Review symposia, and also subsequent NLR publications).

== History ==
The first New Legal Realist Conference held in North America took place in Madison, Wisconsin in June 2004. The Conference was jointly funded by the American Bar Foundation, an independent social science research institute in Chicago, and the University of Wisconsin Law School’s Institute for Legal Studies, a center for interdisciplinary research on law. Scholars from these two institutions as well as from Harvard Law School and Emory Law School held initial meetings to plan for the conference.

Prior to this conference, several different strands of new legal realist thought were emerging in the U.S. legal and sociolegal academic communities. In 1997, a group of scholars sponsored a panel entitled “Is It Time for a New Legal Realism?” at the 1997 Law and Society Association Meetings in St. Louis, Missouri. The panel drew a large audience of sociolegal researchers, who debated the issues involved in achieving high-quality translations of qualitative and quantitative empirical research in legal settings. One particular topic of discussion was the sometimes difficult relationship between scholarly traditions in the social sciences and in the legal academy. This strand of new legal realist thought led to the Madison conference, and to the first collaborative publication of research by a peer-reviewed social science journal (Law & Social Inquiry) and a student-edited law review (Wisconsin Law Review). These two publications examined problems such as poverty, globalization, and discrimination from the combined perspectives of law and social science, focusing on developing better methods for interdisciplinary translation.

Also in 1997, political scientist Frank Cross published an article entitled “Political Science and the New Legal Realism” and legal philosopher Brian Tamanaha wrote a book on pragmatism and “realistic socio-legal theory”. The strand of new legal realist thought that originated with Cross examines judicial behavior using quantitative methods. Tamanaha is concerned with bringing the philosophical foundations provided by pragmatist theory to bear on sociolegal research.

== Scholarship and events ==
Since 1997, there have been numerous events and publications focusing on New Legal Realism. After the initial NLR conference in 2004, subsequent NLR conferences have focused on methodology, on the relationship between empirical research and legal theory, on legal approaches to poverty and land ownership, on the legal treatment of gender-related issues in employment, and on statutory interpretation. NLR scholarship has been presented in panels at the annual meetings of the Association of American Law Schools and the Law & Society Association. NLR scholars were active in forming a collaborative research network, supported by the Law and Society Association, focusing on “Realist and Empirical Legal Methods.”

New legal realist scholars utilize empirical methodologies to examine discrimination, judicial decision making, global law, and other topics (see External links, below). In the United States, several strands of New Legal Realism have been identified. In particular, one dominant strand of the US New Legal Realist literature calls for a "bottom up" approach in which scholars pay attention to law on the ground, in everyday lives, using qualitative as well as quantitative methods. In 2005, Erlanger et al. called for using "bottom up" as well as "top down" empirical research. Early symposia in US New Legal Realism demonstrated their "bottom up" approach by presenting actual examples of this kind of research in areas such as discrimination law and its effects in actual life, globalization and law, and law practice. By contrast, another strand proceeds using a more exclusively "top down" approach, focusing on courts and judicial opinions, and generally using quantitative methods. Scholars in Scandinavia are also returning to an interest in legal realism, building on their own earlier legal realist tradition. In May 2012, the first European conference on new legal realism was held in Copenhagen, bringing together an international group of scholars from a variety of disciplines. The conference was organized by Jakob v. H. Holtermann, Mikael Rask Madsen, and Henrik Palmer Olsen. In 2014, the 10th Anniversary U.S. NLR Conference was held at the University of California-Irvine Law School.

== See also ==
- Legal Realism
- Sociology of law
- Legal anthropology
- Philosophy of law
