= Herman Oliphant =

American legal scholar (1884–1939)

Herman Enzla Oliphant
- Born: August 31, 1884; Forest, Indiana, U.S.
- Died: January 11, 1939 (aged 54)
- Education: Marion College; Indiana University (AB); University of Chicago (JD)
- Organization(s): University of Chicago Law School, Columbia Law School
- Known for: Legal realism and jurisprudence
- Spouse: Julia Sims (m. 1905)

Herman Enzla Oliphant was an American legal scholar and professor at the University of Chicago Law School and Columbia Law School. He is considered to be a leading figure of the legal realism movement in the United States.

== Early life and education ==
Oliphant was born in Forest, Indiana, on August 31, 1884, to Albert G. Oliphant, a farmer and livestock trader, and Martha Jane Richardson. He grew up on the family farm. In 1903, he graduated from Forest High School and attended Marion College. He returned home in 1905 to marry his childhood sweetheart, Julia Sims. In 1907, he graduated from Marion College and then went on to obtain an A.B. with majors in philology, Greek, and philosophy from Indiana University (1909) and his J.D. degree from the University of Chicago Law School in 1914.

== Career ==
Oliphant began his teaching career at the University of Chicago Law School before joining the Columbia Law School faculty in 1922. Shortly after his arrival at Columbia University, he wrote to the university's president, Nicholas Murray Butler, outlining some plans he had for reorganizing the curriculum of the law school. Essentially, his goal was to transform the school into a research center, placing particular emphasis on the interaction of the law and other social sciences. Under the administration of Huger Jervey, who became dean of the law school in 1924, Oliphant's plans were used as the basis for a reorganization of the law school. In 1932, Oliphant was co-author with Theodore S. Hope Jr. of "Study of Day Calendars" 1932, an in-depth look into how time effects trial cases.

Oliphant later went on to teach at Johns Hopkins University, and later became the chief counsel of the United States Treasury Department, serving in that capacity from 1934 to 1939. While serving in that position, he was regarded as an economic experimenter, and was the prime advocate of the undistributed profits tax. He was known for shaping many of the policies of the New Deal under President Franklin D. Roosevelt. While at the Treasury Department, Oliphant was lobbied by William Randolph Hearst to make cannabis illegal. Hearst had recently become heavily involved in synthetics based on petroleum hydrocarbons, and wanted to quash efforts from competing companies to make similar products from hemp seed oil. Although that theory has been promoted for Oliphant's push for the Marihuana Tax Act of 1937, his nephew Dr. Cleon O. Swayzee of Columbia University, in a 1984 interview stated two other reasons that took precedence for Oliphant's efforts. First was the influence of Oliphant's brother, Dr. Homer Oliphant, a physician who practiced in Forest and Frankfort, Indiana, and who was promoting the theory as early as 1919 that smoking was dangerous for the health of mothers and unborn babies. Granted Oliphant didn't do anything about smoking cigarettes. The second reason was that in the midst of the Great Depression with limited employment opportunities this endeavor was a vehicle to discourage immigration particularly from Mexico.

== Influence on legal realism ==
Oliphant is generally regarded as a representative of American legal realism and is famous for his statement that the principle of stare decisis is no longer applicable. Although the approach could be implemented in a time when society was relatively simply structured, in the present age it should be abandoned. To this effect, Oliphant pleaded a scientific approach. In his opinion, the way a judge deals with a case can be qualified as a stimulus-response situation, in the sense that the judge reacts to the stimulus of the case brought to his attention. In his 1928 inaugural address as President of the American Association of Law Schools, Oliphant said: "Our case material is a gold mine for scientific work. It has not been scientifically exploited ... We should critically examine all the methods now used in any of the social sciences and having any useful degree of objectivity."

== Death ==
Oliphant died on January 11, 1939, of heart disease at the age of 54. He is buried in Frankfort, Indiana.

== Literature ==
- Herman Oliphant, 'A Return to Stare Decisis', in American Bar Association Journal 14 (1928).
