= U.S. Permanent Committee for the Oliver Wendell Holmes Devise =

The U.S. Permanent Committee for the Oliver Wendell Holmes Devise is a committee established by Congress in 1955 after the late Associate Justice Oliver Wendell Holmes Jr. bequeathed a portion of his estate to the United States in 1935. Congress used the gift to establish the committee to document and disseminate the history of the Court. The committee is composed of five members - the Librarian of Congress and four additional members appointed by the President to serve eight-year terms. As of October 2020, the commission has published ten volumes detailing the history of the Supreme Court.

== History ==
Oliver Wendell Holmes Jr., Associate Justice of the United States Supreme Court, died on March 6, 1935; his will contained the following residuary clause,

“All of the rest, residue and remainder of my property of whatsoever nature, wheresoever situate, of which I may die seized and possessed, or in which I may have an interest at the time of my death, I give, devise, and bequeath to the UNITED STATES OF AMERICA.”

The value of the bequest was roughly $263,000 at the time of Holmes's death and it was President Franklin Roosevelt who recommended the gift be used to document and promote the law. In 1938 a committee of three Congressmen, three Senators, and three Supreme Court members recommended four options for the gift. The options were: (1) establish a collection of legal literature in the Library of Congress, (2) turning Holmes residence into a permanent memorial, (3) publishing Holmes writings, or (4) creating a memorial park in Washington dedicated to Holmes. Congress approved the third and fourth recommendations in 1940, however, World War II pre-empted execution of the plans. The matter was finalized in 1955 with Public Law 84-246 which established the Permanent Committee for the Oliver Wendell Holmes Devise to publish an official history of the Supreme Court. The committee has four members appointed by the President as recommended by the Association of American Law Schools, the American Philosophical Society, the American Historical Association, and the Association of American Universities, with the Librarian of Congress serving as ex officio chairperson. The series has not been published in volume order. The first published were Volume 1: Antecedents and beginnings to 1801 and Volume 6: Reconstruction and reunion, 1864-88 in 1971. Published in 2023, the most recent history is Volume 10: The Taft Court. A volume covering the Earl Warren court was expected in 2017, but it is yet to be published.

== Bibliography ==
History of the Supreme Court of the United States series:

- Goebel, Julius (1971). Volume 1: Antecedents and Beginnings to 1801. New York: Macmillan. https://lccn.loc.gov/95199411
- Haskins, George Lee, and Herbert Alan Johnson (1981). Volume 2: Foundations of Power, John Marshall, 1801-15. New York: Macmillan. https://lccn.loc.gov/95200554
- White, G. Edward, and Gerald Gunther (1988). Volumes 3 - 4: The Marshall Court and Cultural Change, 1815-35. New York: Macmillan. https://lccn.loc.gov/95199926
- Swisher, Carl Brent (1974). Volume 5: The Taney Period, 1836-64. New York: Macmillan. https://lccn.loc.gov/72093318
- Fairman, Charles (1971). Volume 6: Reconstruction and Reunion, 1864-88, Part 1. New York: Macmillan. [Later expanded and combined with Volume 7 in 1987] https://www.loc.gov/item/library-publications/reconstruction-and-reunion-1864-1888-2/
- Fairman, Charles (1987). Volumes 6-7: Reconstruction and Reunion, 1864-88. New York: Macmillan. https://lccn.loc.gov/70169254
- Fiss, Owen M. (1993). Volume 8: Troubled Beginnings of the Modern State, 1888-1910. New York: Macmillan. https://lccn.loc.gov/93018238
- Bickel, Alexander M., and Benno C. Schmidt (1984). Volume 9: The Judiciary and Responsible Government, 1910-21. New York: Macmillan. https://lccn.loc.gov/85136233
- Post, Robert. (2023). Volume 10: The Taft Court: Making Law for a Divided Nation, 1921–1930. New York: Cambridge University Press. https://doi.org/10.1017/9781009336246
- Tushnet, Mark V. (2022). Volume 11: The Hughes Court: From Progressivism to Pluralism, 1930 to 1941. New York: Cambridge University Press. https://doi.org/10.1017/9781009031141
- Wiecek, William M. (2006). Volume 12: The birth of the Modern Constitution, the United States Supreme Court, 1941-1953. New York: Cambridge University Press. https://lccn.loc.gov/2004028548
