= Underhill Moore =

William Underhill Moore (1879–1949) was an American legal scholar and Sterling Professor of Law at the Yale Law School (1929–49), having previously taught at Columbia. His principal teaching fields were commercial bank credit and business organizations, Moore was considered one of the intellectual leaders of the Legal Realism movement at Yale and an early user of social scientific methods in legal research.

In 1929 he was co-author with Theodore S. Hope Jr. of "An Institutional Approach to the Law of Commercial Banking," as published in the Yale Law Journal, 1929, an explanation and predicting of banking law decisions that "did not appear to derive from existing legal rules by determining the extent to which the facts of the case deviated from normal banking practice."

Moore believed that judicial decisions often reflected norms of commercial behavior rather than judicial precedent, and he therefore sought to establish a body of factual empirical data as the basis of legal studies. In a famous 1929 study, An Institutional Approach to the Law of Commercial Banking, Moore and co-author Theodore S. Hope, Jr. attempted to explain banking law judicial decisions that did not appear to derive from existing legal rules (lex lata). The authors examined banks' then common use of what were considered to be questionable practices and found that courts upheld a bank's practice when it was in conformance with the practice of other banks in the area, even though it deviated from hypothetical "normal banking practice." In later articles with Gilbert Sussman, Moore undertook an empirical survey of actual banking practices in discounting notes. Moore's empirical emphasis in legal research characterized the body of his work.

Moore's detractors deprecated his empirical work as superficial and contended that "the real social scientists at Yale" rejected it and considered that it "really didn't contribute much."

In a tribute to Moore, Justice William O. Douglas, who was his student and research assistant, described Moore's explanation of his body of work and his refutation of his detractors:

The so-called legal lights ridicule my project. They do not understand it and it would be futile to try to make them understand. I am not writing for them. I am writing for the small select group who are groping for ways of applying the scientific method to the social sciences. Perhaps the present effort will fail. But some day it may succeed. A hundred or five hundred years from now a kindred soul may find in my crude researches some clue to the solution. He is the audience for whom I write.
