= Prediction theory of law =

Legal theory

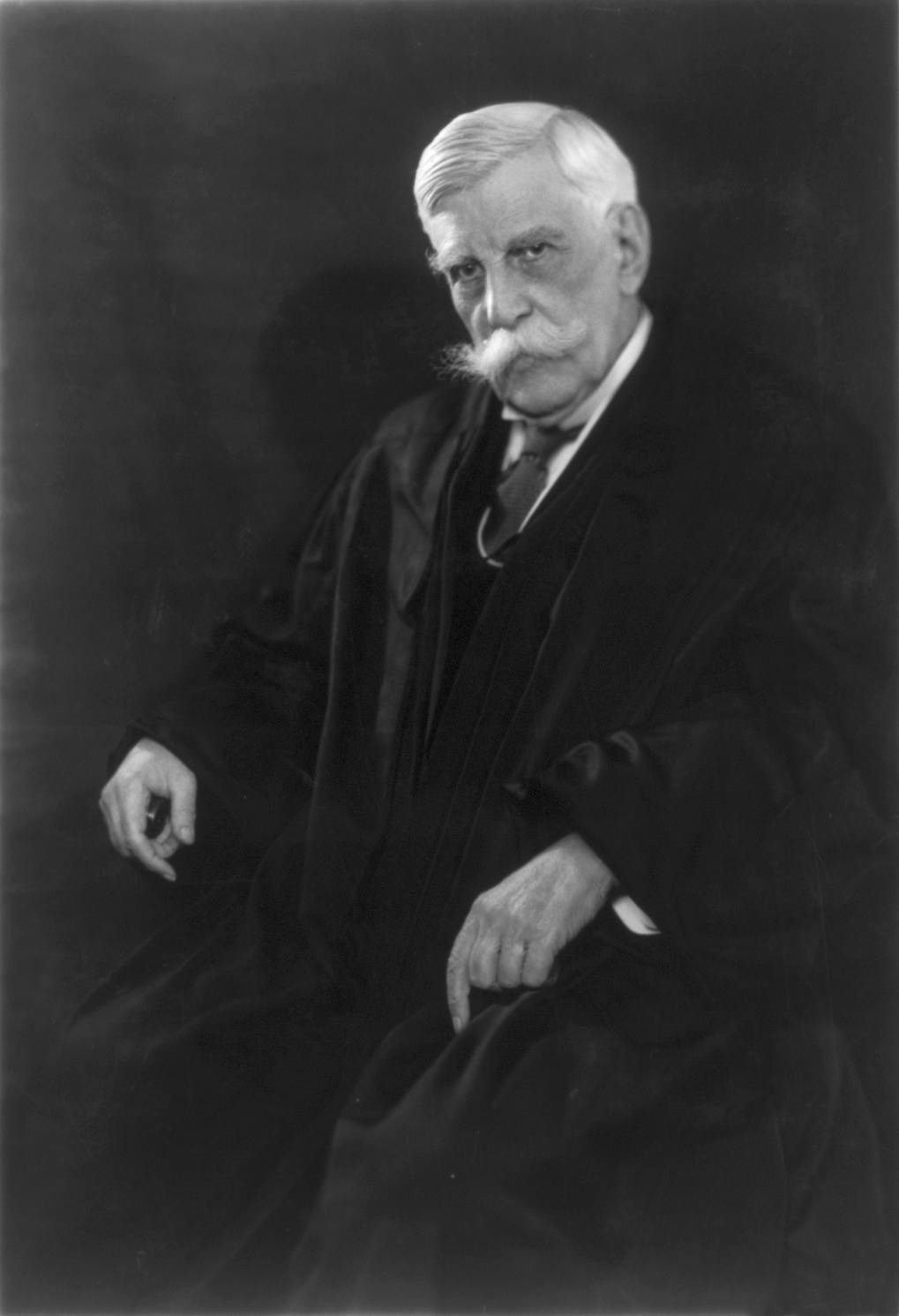
Oliver Wendell Holmes, Jr., circa 1930.

The prediction theory of law was a key component of Oliver Wendell Holmes's jurisprudential philosophy. At its most basic, the theory is an attempted refutation of most previous definitions of the law. Holmes believed that the law should be defined as a prediction, most specifically, a prediction of how the courts behave. His rationale was based on an argument regarding the opinion of a "bad man." Bad men, Holmes argued in his speech The Path of the Law, care little for ethics or lofty conceptions of natural law; instead they care simply about staying out of jail and avoiding the payment of damages. In Holmes's mind, therefore, it was most useful to define "the law" as a prediction of what will bring punishment or other consequences from a court.

The theory played a key role in influencing American legal realism.

H. L. A. Hart criticized the theories in his The Concept of Law (1961). He argued that (1) they were blind to the internal point of view towards law, the sense shared by officials and law-abiding citizens that rules of law 'ought' to be obeyed, and (2) they undervalue "the ways in which the law is used to control, to guide, and to plan life out of court." As for the 'bad man', Hart asks, "Why should not law be equally if not more concerned with the 'puzzled man' or 'ignorant man' who is willing to do what is required, if only he can be told what it is? Or with the 'man who wishes to arrange his affairs' if only he can be told how to do it?"

== See also ==
- Judicial activism
- Pragmatism
- Rule according to higher law
- Rational egoism

=== References ===
- Hart, H. L. A. (1961). The Concept of Law. Clarendon Press.
