= Skepticism in law =

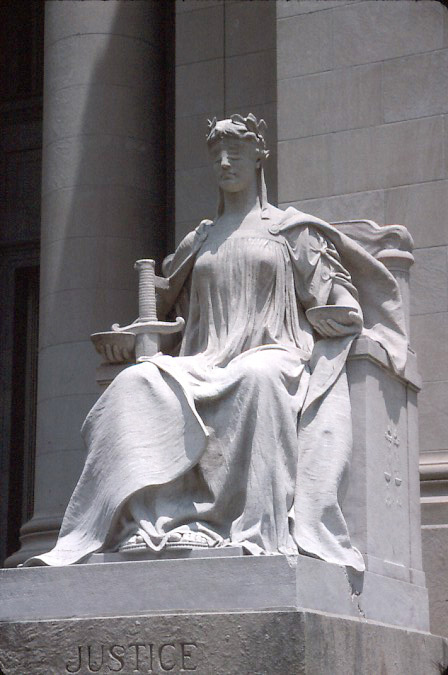
Lady Justice is the symbol of the judiciary. Justice is depicted as a goddess equipped with three symbols of the rule of law: a sword symbolizing the court's coercive power; scales representing the weighing of competing claims; and a blindfold indicating impartiality.

Skepticism in law is a school of jurisprudence that was a reaction against the idea of natural law, and a response to the formalism of legal positivists. Legal skepticism is sometimes known as legal realism.

According to Richard Posner, "The skeptical vein in American thinking about law runs from Holmes to the legal realists to the critical legal studies movement, while behind Holmes stretches a European skeptical legal tradition that runs from Thrasymachus (in Plato's Republic) to Hobbes and Bentham and beyond".

...men make their own laws; that these laws do not flow from some mysterious omnipresence in the sky, and that judges are not independent mouthpieces of the infinite.The common law is not a brooding omnipresence in the sky

— Justice Oliver Wendell Holmes

== Origin ==
Skepticism (American English and Canadian English) or scepticism (British English and Australian English) is a philosophical approach that includes a scientific method and a rejection of unevidenced claims to certainty. Skepticism has been known in various degrees. Pyrrho was the first philosopher who developed it to a high degree. Greek Sophist were also skeptics. Protagoras was a famous Greek Sophist. Greek Sophists were also law teachers.

Writing about the courts of Athenian democracy, Bertrand Russell states: "In general, there were a large number of judges to hear each case. The plaintiff and defendant, or prosecutor and accused, appeared in person, not through professional lawyers. Naturally, success or failure depended largely on oratorical skill in appealing to popular prejudices. Although a man had to deliver his own speech, he could hire an expert to write a speech for him, or, as many preferred, he could pay for instruction in the arts required for success in the law courts. These arts the Sophists were supposed to teach".

Samuel Enoch Stumpf writes about Sophists, "It was their skepticism and relativism that made them suspect. No one would have criticized them for training lawyers, as they did, to be able to argue either side of a case". American legal skeptics are influenced by pragmatism of William James, John Dewey, and Charles Peirce.

Bertrand Russell declared that William James's doctrine is "an attempt to build a superstructure of belief upon a foundation of scepticism".

== Early history ==
Mickey Dias writes: "a preliminary warning is needed against the tendency to imagine that there is anything like a 'school' of American realists. A difficulty in the way of a coherent presentation of their views is that there are varying versions of realism as well as changes of front; positions formerly defended with zest have since been forgotten or abandoned.... Judge Jerome Frank (1889–1957), a leading exponent preferred the phrases "experimentalists" or "constructive skeptics". He repudiated the charge that "the realist school embraced fantastically inconsistent ideas" by pointing out that "actually no such school existed". The common bond is, in his words, "skepticism as to some of the conventional legal theories, a skepticism stimulated by a zeal to reform, in the interests of justice, some court-house ways." With such zeal to reform, legal skeptics made a revolt against the formalism.

Lord Lloyd of Hamstead has described this revolt in a wider philosophical perspective as follows:

"In the nineteenth and at the beginning of the present century, laissez-faire was the dominant creed in America. This creed was associated, in the intellectual sphere, with a certain attachment to what has been called "formalism" in philosophy and the social sciences. This was marked by a reverence for the role of logic and mathematics and a priori reasoning as applied to philosophy, economics and jurisprudence, with but little urge to link these empirically to the facts of life. Yet empirical science and technology were increasing dominating American society and with this development arose and intellectual movement in favor of treating philosophy and the social sciences, and even logic itself, as empirical studies not rooted in abstract formalism. In America this movement was associated with such figures as William James and Dewey in philosophy and logic. Veblen in economics, Beard and Robinson in historical studies, and Mr. Justice Holmes in jurisprudence. This movement was especially hostile to the so-called British empirical school derived from Hume, and to which Jeremy Bentham, John Austin and John Stuart Mill adhered. For while it is true that these thinkers were positivist and anti-metaphysical, they were, for anti-formalists, not empirical enough, since they were associated with a priori reasoning not based on actual study of the facts, such as Mill's formal logic and his reliance on an abstract "economic man," Bentham's hedonic calculus of pleasures and pains, and the analytical approach to jurisprudence derived from Austin. They were particularly critical of the ahistorical approach of the English utilitarians.

The new movement in jurisprudence found philosophical support in pragmatism. The principal exponent of pragmatism, William James, wrote: "A pragmatist turns away from abstraction and insufficiencies, from verbal solutions, from bad a priori reasons, from fixed principles, closed systems and pretended absolutes and origins. He turns towards completeness and adequacy, towards facts, towards actions, towards powers.

== Justice Oliver Wendell Holmes Jr. ==
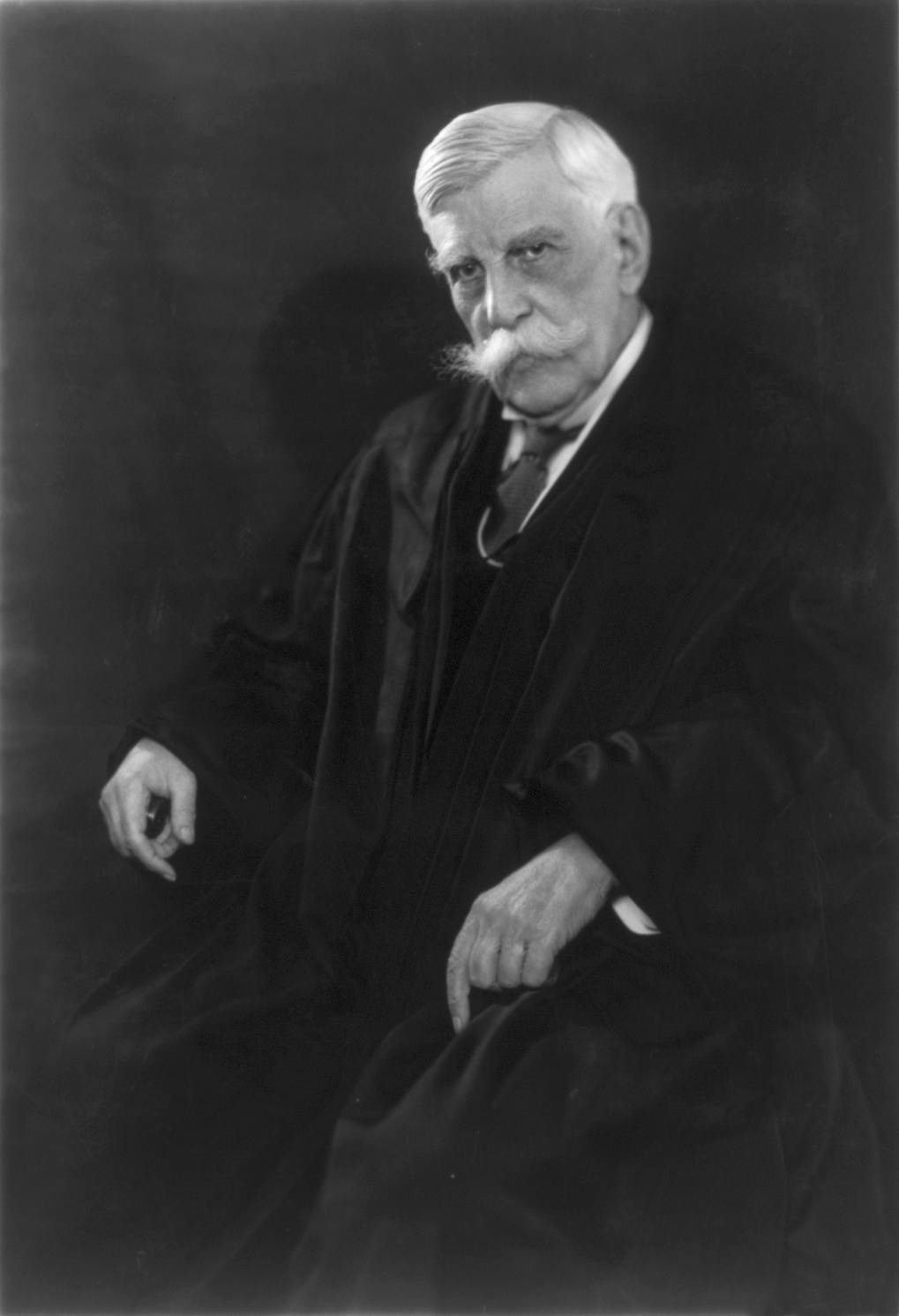
Associate Justice of the United States Supreme Court Oliver Wendell Holmes Jr.

This skeptical approach impressed Justice Holmes, who laid the foundation of healthy and constructive skepticism in the law. Hughes writes: "Though another half century was to elapse before the appearance of Ogden and Richard's The Meaning of Meaning, exploration of meaning of meaning of law was Holmes's pioneer enterprise. Hughes further writes: "To me, Mr. Justice Holmes is a prophet of the law,

Oliver Wendell Holmes Jr. graduated from Harvard Law School in 1866 and opened a private law practice, but he devoted much of his energy to legal scholarship. From 1870 to 1873 he served as editor of the American Law Review and taught constitutional law at Harvard.

In 1881, Holmes published The Common Law, representing a new departure in legal philosophy. The opening sentence captures the pragmatic theme of that work and of Holmes's philosophy of law: "The life of the law has not been logic: it has been experience." As a Supreme Court justice, Holmes was known for the eloquence, pungency, and abundance of his dissenting opinions—so much so that he was called the "Great Dissenter." Holmes was appointed a justice in 1902 and served the Court for thirty years. At that time, the Court was declaring many state regulatory laws unconstitutional because the Court felt they did not conform to its concept of due process of law.

In a dissenting opinion in Lochner v. New York (1905), Holmes declared that the law should develop along with society and that the 14th Amendment did not deny states a right to experiment by enacting social legislation. He also argued for judicial restraint, asserting that the Court should not interpret the Constitution according to its own social philosophy. Speaking for a unanimous Court in Schenck v. United States (1919), however, he stated that freedom of speech could be limited when it created a "clear and present danger". Francis Biddle writes: "He was convinced that one who administers constitutional law should multiply his skepticisms to avoid heading into vague words like liberty, and reading into law his private convictions or the prejudices of his class." Biddle also writes that Holmes "refused to let his preferences (other men were apt to call them convictions) interfere with his judicial decisions.... Holmes's determination to keep his own views apart from his judicial decisions is shown by his famous remark in the Lochner case that "the Fourteenth Amendment does not enact Mr. Herbert Spencer's Social Statics.... [A] constitution is not intended to embody a particular economic theory".

According to Holmes, "men make their own laws; that these laws do not flow from some mysterious omnipresence in the sky, and that these laws do not flow from some mysterious omnipresence in the sky, and that judges are not independent mouthpieces of the infinite. "The common law is not a brooding omnipresence in the sky". Law should be viewed "from the stance of the bad man. "The prophecies of what the courts will do in fact, and nothing more pretentious, are what I mean by the law". A judge must be aware of social facts. Only a judge or lawyer who is acquainted with the historical, social, and economic aspects of the law will be in a position to fulfill his functions properly.

In The Common Law, Holmes wrote: "The life of the law has not been logic: it has been experience. The felt necessities of the time, the prevalent moral and political theories, intuitions of public policy, avowed or unconscious, and even the prejudices which judges share with their fellow-men, have had a good deal more to do than syllogism in determining the rules by which men should be governed."

The law embodies the story of a nation's development through many centuries, and it cannot be dealt with as if it contained only the axioms and corollaries of a book of mathematics.

— Justice Oliver Wendell Holmes

The law embodies the story of a nation's development through many centuries, and it cannot be dealt with as if it contained only the axioms and corollaries of a book of mathematics.

In Lochner v. New York he observes, "General principles do not decide concrete cases."

"General propositions do not decide concrete cases."

— Justice Oliver Wendell Holmes

Holmes, also insisted on the separation of 'ought' and 'is' which are obstacles in understanding the realities of the law. As an ethical skeptic, Holmes tells us that if you want to know the real law, and nothing else, you must consider it from the point of view of 'bad man' who cares only from material consequences of the courts' decisions, and not from the point of view of good man, who find his reasons for conduct "in the vaguer sanctions of his conscience. The law is full of phraseology drawn from morals, and talks about rights and duties, malice, intent, and negligence- and nothing is easier in legal reasoning than to take these words in their moral sense. Holmes said: "I think our morally tinted words have caused a great deal of confused thinking. But Holmes is not unconcerned with moral question. He writes: "The law is the witness and external deposit of our moral life. Its history is the history of the moral development of the race. The practice of it, in spite of popular jests, tends to make good citizens and good men. When I emphasize the difference between law and morals I do so with reference to a single end, that of learning and understanding the law.

== Jerome Frank ==
Jerome New Frank followed Holmes skepticism, and made an elaborate system of legal skepticism. He considered himself to be 'a constructive skeptic'. He challenged the traditional conception that law consists of rules from which deductions are made. He called that conception a 'basic myth of law'. He argued that it is fruitless to seek such certainty, that the law is uncertain and that the law cannot be separated from decisions of the courts.

Frank argues that every legal controversy is unique and may not be decided by rigid universals and abstract generalizations. He calls those jurists who find legal uncertainty within the laws's formal rules 'Rule-skeptics', and those who find legal uncertainty arising from the nature of facts 'Fact-skeptics'. Dias writes: "Frank divided realists into two camps, described as 'rule skeptics' and 'fact skeptic'. The 'rule skeptics' rejected legal rules as providing uniformity in law, and tried instead to find uniformity in rules evolved out of psychology, anthropology, sociology, economics, politics, etc. Hans Kelsen, it will be remembered, maintained that it is not possible to derive an 'ought' from an 'is'. The 'rule skeptics' avoided that criticism by saying that they were not deriving purposive 'oughts', but only predictions of judicial behaviour analogous to the laws of science. Frank called this brand realism the left-wing adherents of a right-wing traditions, namely, the tradition of trying to find uniformity in rules. They, too, had to account for uncertainty in the law on the basis of rule-uncertainty. The 'fact skeptics', among them Frank, rejected even this aspiration towards uniformity. So he abandoned all attempts to seek rule-certainty and pointed to the uncertainty of establishing even the facts in trial courts. These have to be established largely by witnesses, who are fallible and who may be lying. It is impossible to predict with any degree of certainty how fallible a particular witness is likely to be, or how persuasively he will lie. All persons, judges and jurymen alike, form different impressions of the dramas unfolded before them; an inflexion or a cough may awaken subconscious predilections, varied idiosyncrasies and prejudices. Eternal verities are not to be erected on such a basis. Frank alleged that all those who write on legal certainty, not excepting the 'rule skeptics', overlook these difficulty. 'They often call their writings 'jurisprudence'; but as they almost never consider juries and jury-trials, one might chide them for forgetting jurisprudence. ", "For any particular lay person", Frank writes: "the law, with respect to any particular set of facts, is a decision of a court with respect to those facts so far as that decision affects that particular person. Until a court has passed on those facts no law on that subject is yet in existence. ,

Felix Frankfurter, who wrote book "Mr. Justice Holmes and the Supreme Court" published three years after the death of Holmes, observes in Nashville, Chattanooga & St. Louis Ry. V. Browning that: "It would be a narrow conception of jurisprudence to confine the notion of 'laws' to what is found written on the statute books, and to disregard the gloss which life has written upon it."

It would be a narrow conception of jurisprudence to confine the notion of 'laws' to what is found written on the statute books, and to disregard the gloss which life has written upon it.

— Justice Felix Frankfurter

Statutes and constitutions are inanimate object which cannot speak by themselves. John Chipman Gray, the great American Jurist, who reiterated Holmes's view, writes: "Statutes do not interpret themselves; their meaning is declared by the courts, and it is with the meaning declared by the courts, and with no other meaning, that they are imposed upon the community as law. , He further writes: "It has been sometime said that the Law is composed of two parts,-legislative law and judge-made law, but, in truth all the Law is judge-made law. The shape in which a statute is imposed on the community as a guide for conduct is that statute as interpreted by the courts. The courts put life into the dead words of the statute. 339 To quote from Bishop Hoadly.......'Nay, whoever hath an absolute authority to interpret any written or spoken laws, it is He who is truly the law Giver to all intents and purposes, and not who first who wrote and spoke them”.

== See also ==
- H. L. A. Hart
- Interpretivism (legal)
- Judicial activism
- International legal theory
- Libertarian theories of law
- Legal naturalism
- Living Constitution
- Positive law
- Philosophy of law

== Sources ==
- "The myth of veil of Words, an obstacle in understanding the realities of law." by Waqar Hassan.
