= Marshall Ayres =

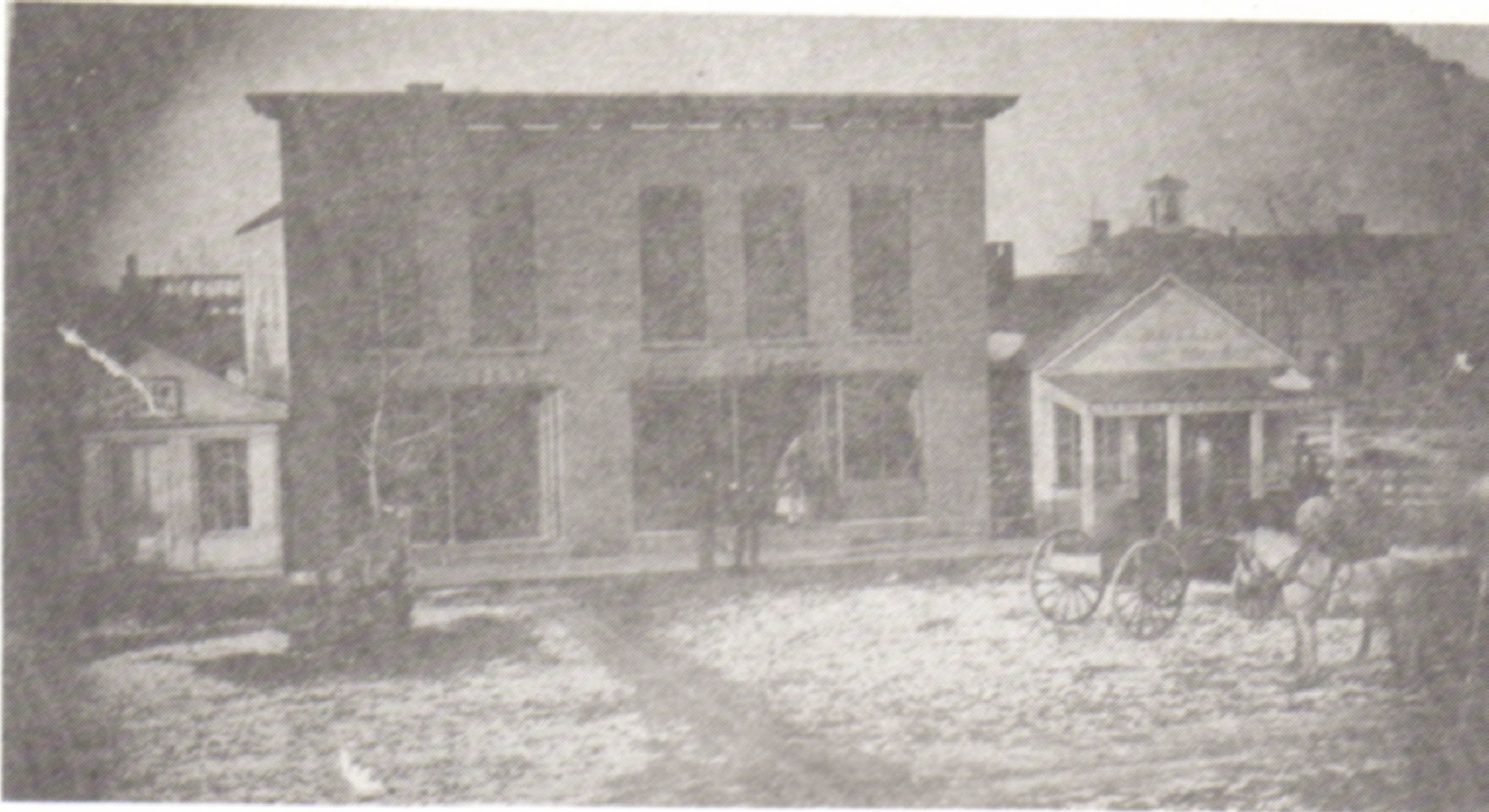
Ayres & Lombard Bank & Store-Griggsville, Illinois 1847

Marshall Ayres (born June 28, 1807) was an American pioneer, one of the founding pioneers of the American Midwest, particularly around the Chicago, Illinois region.

== Early years ==
Ayres was born in Truro, Massachusetts (Cape Cod). He was the seventh child of nine born to father Jason Ayres and mother Betsey Holman who were married April 17, 1791. His father was a medical doctor.

Ayres married Hannah (Lombard) Ayers, who was native to Truro, Massachusetts. Ayres, was one of the pioneer residents of Griggsville, Illinois moving there in 1821.

Their son Marshall Ayres, Jr., a future oil industrialist, was born on February 20, 1839

The two families were successful business partners in Illinois with the Ayres & Lombard Bank & Store, and also a steamboat ferry called Prairie State.
