= Emily & Theodore Hope Forest =

Coordinates: 43°29′38″N 71°53′14″W

The Emily & Theodore Hope Forest is a 376-acre (152 ha) permanent forest reservation located in Danbury, New Hampshire.

== History ==
In 1987, Theodore S. Hope Jr. and his wife Emily Blanchard Hope, who retired to Danbury after practicing corporate law in New York City for over 50 years, donated 482 acres (195 ha) of land to the New England Forestry Foundation.

In 1991, 376 acres (1.52 km^{2}) of the donated land became part of the Society for the Protection of New Hampshire Forests. The land is named after Theodore and his wife Emily.

== Recreational use ==
The main entry (gated) to the forest is located on Roy Ford Road in Danbury. 4 miles (6.4 km) of hiking, with several hundred feet elevation change, is available via logging trails, with modest uphill bushwhacking.
