= Legal realism =

Legal philosophy in which jurisprudence should rely on empirical evidence

Legal realism is a naturalistic approach to law; it is the view that jurisprudence should emulate the methods of natural science; that is, it should rely on empirical evidence. Hypotheses must be tested against observations of the world.

Legal realists believe that legal science should only investigate law with the value-free methods of natural sciences, rather than through philosophical inquiries into the nature and meaning of the law that are separate and distinct from the law as it is actually practiced. Indeed, legal realism asserts that the law cannot be separated from its application, nor can it be understood outside of its application. As such, legal realism emphasizes law as it actually exists, rather than law as it ought to be. Locating the meaning of law in places such as legal opinions issued by judges and their deference to or dismissal of precedent and the doctrine of stare decisis, it stresses the importance of understanding the factors involved in judicial decision-making.

In Scandinavia Axel Hägerström developed another realist tradition that was influential in European jurisprudential circles for most of the 20th century.

== Overview ==
Legal realism is associated with US jurisprudence during the 1920s and 1930s, particularly among federal judges and lawyers within the Roosevelt administration. Notable jurists associated with legal realism include Felix Cohen, Morris Cohen, Arthur Corbin, Walter Wheeler Cook, Robert Hale, Wesley Hohfeld, Karl Llewellyn, Underhill Moore, Herman Oliphant and Warren Seavey, many of whom were associated with Yale Law School. As Keith Bybee argues, "legal realism exposed the role played by politics in judicial decision-making and, in doing so, called into question conventional efforts to anchor judicial power on a fixed, impartial foundation." Contemporary legal scholars working within the Law and Society tradition have expanded upon the foundations set by legal realism to postulate what has been referred to as new legal realism.

As a form of jurisprudence, legal realism is defined by its focus on the law as it actually exists in practice, rather than how it exists in books. To this end, it was primarily concerned with the actions of judges and the factors that influenced processes of judicial decision making. As Karl Llewellyn argues, “[b]ehind decisions stand judges; judges are men; as men they have human backgrounds.” The law, therefore, did not exist in a metaphysical realm of fundamental rules or principles, but was inseparable from human action and the power of judges to determine the law. In order to understand the decisions and actions of legal actors, legal realists turned to the ideas of the social sciences in order to understand the human behavior and relationships that culminated in a given legal outcome.

Legal realists believe that there is more to adjudication than the disinterested application of known legal principles to uncontroversial fact-finding in line with the arguments of legal formalism. Some realists argue that the facts and law identified in a judge's opinion are not the actual reasons for why the judgment was reached, but rather that judges tend to reason backwards after having reached a conclusion on moral and/or public policy grounds. Other realists accept that a judge's reasons can often be relied upon, but not always.

Due to their value-free approach, legal realists oppose natural law traditions. Legal realists contend that these traditions are historical and social phenomena and should be explained by psychological and sociological hypotheses, conceiving of legal phenomena as determined by human behavior that should be investigated empirically, rather than according to theoretical assumptions about the law.

Realism was treated as a conceptual claim for much of the late 20th century due to H. L. A. Hart's misunderstanding of the theory. Hart was an analytical legal philosopher who was interested in the conceptual analysis of concepts such as "law." This entailed identifying the necessary and sufficient conditions for the use of the concept of "law." When realists such as Oliver Wendell Holmes Jr. pointed out that individuals embroiled in the legal system generally wanted to know what was going to happen, Hart assumed that they were offering the necessary and sufficient conditions for the use of the concept of "law." Legal theorists tend to recognize that the realists and the conceptual lawyers were interested in different questions. Realists are interested in methods of predicting judges' decisions with more accuracy, whereas conceptual lawyers are interested in the correct use of legal concepts.

Legal realism was primarily a reaction to the legal formalism of the late 19th century and early 20th century and was the dominant approach for much of the early 20th century. It succeeded in its negative aspiration of casting doubt upon formalist assumptions that judges always did what they said, so that it is often said that "we are all realists now." However, realism failed in its positive aspiration of discovering a better way of predicting how judges would behave than relying on the reasons given by judges.

A theory of law and legal reasoning that arose in the early decades of the twentieth century is broadly characterized by the claim that law can be best understood by focusing on what judges actually do in deciding cases, rather than on what they say they are doing. The central target of legal realism was legal formalism: the classical view that judges don't make law, but mechanically apply it by logically deducing uniquely correct legal conclusions from a set of clear, consistent, and comprehensive legal rules. American legal realism has aptly been described as "the most important indigenous jurisprudential movement in the United States during the twentieth century".

== Forerunners ==
Although the American legal realist movement first emerged as a cohesive intellectual force in the 1920s, it drew heavily upon a number of prior thinkers and was influenced by broader cultural forces. In the early years of the twentieth century, formalist approaches to the law had been forcefully criticized by thinkers such as Roscoe Pound, John Chipman Gray, and Benjamin Cardozo. Philosophers such as John Dewey had held up empirical science as a model of all intelligent inquiry, and argued that law should be seen as a practical instrument for advancing human welfare. Outside the realm of law, in fields such as economics and history, there was a general "revolt against formalism," a reaction in favor of more empirical ways of doing philosophy and the human sciences. But by far the most important intellectual influence on the legal realists was the thought of the American jurist and Supreme Court Justice Oliver Wendell Holmes Jr.

=== Oliver Wendell Holmes Jr. ===
Holmes is a towering figure in American legal thought for many reasons, but what the realists drew most from Holmes was his famous prediction theory of law, his utilitarian approach to legal reasoning, and his "realist" insistence that judges, in deciding cases, are not deducing legal conclusions with inexorable, machine-like logic, but are influenced by ideas of fairness, public policy, prejudices, and experience. In the opening paragraph of The Common Law, he wrote:

The life of the law has not been logic: it has been experience. The felt necessities of the time, the prevalent moral and political theories, intuitions of public policy, avowed or unconscious, and even the prejudices which judges share with their fellow-men, have had a good deal more to do than the syllogism in determining the rules by which men should be governed. The law embodies the story of a nation's development through many centuries, and it cannot be dealt with as if it contained only the axioms and corollaries of a book of mathematics.

All these themes can be found in Holmes's famous 1897 essay, "The Path of the Law". There Holmes attacks formalist approaches to judicial decision-making and states a pragmatic definition of law: "The prophecies of what the courts will do in fact, and nothing more pretentious, are what I mean by the law". If law is prophecy, Holmes continues, we must reject the view of "text writers" who tell us that law "is something different from what is decided by the courts of Massachusetts or England, that it is a system of reason that is a deduction from principles of ethics or admitted axioms or what not, which may or may not coincide with the decisions".

Holmes introduced the "bad-man" theory of law: "[I]f we take the view of our friend the bad man we shall find that he does not care two straws" about either the morality or the logic of the law. For the bad man, "legal duty" signifies only "a prophecy that if he does certain things he will be subjected to disagreeable consequences by way of imprisonment or compulsory payment". The bad man cares nothing for legal theorizing and concerns himself only with practical consequences. In the spirit of pragmatism, Holmes suggests that this is a useful way of laying bare the true meaning of legal concepts.

The utilitarian or instrumentalist flavor of "The Path of the Law" also found favor with the realists. The purpose of the law, Holmes insisted, was the deterrence of undesirable social consequences: "I think that the judges themselves have failed adequately to recognize their duty of weighing considerations of social advantage." Before the Civil War, this conception of adjudication as a form of social engineering had been widely shared by American judges, but in the late nineteenth century it had fallen out of favor. One of the aspirations of both Holmes and the realists was to revive it. For example, in his dissent in Southern Pacific Co. v. Jensen, Holmes wrote, "The common law is not a brooding omnipresence in the sky, but the articulate voice of some sovereign ... that can be identified," thereby arguing in favor of a pragmatic and more realistic approach to judicial interpretation of common law.

== Key themes ==
Drawing upon Holmes and other critics of legal formalism, a number of iconoclastic legal scholars launched the legal realist movement in the 1920s and 30s. Among the leading legal realists were Karl Llewellyn, Jerome Frank, Herman Oliphant, Underhill Moore, Walter Wheeler Cook, Leon Green, and Felix Cohen. Two American law schools, Yale and Columbia, were hotbeds of realist thought. Realism was a mood more than a cohesive movement, but it had some common themes. These include:

- A distrust of the judicial technique of seeming to deduce legal conclusions from so-called rules of law. The realists believed that judges neither do nor should decide cases formalistically. Law is not, as the formalists claimed, a system of rules that is clear, consistent, and complete. Rather, the law is riddled with ambiguities, contradictions, gaps, vague terms, and conflicting rules of interpretation. As a result, there is often (perhaps always) no uniquely correct answer to any hard case that appellate judges decide. Law is incurably "indeterminate".
- A belief in the instrumental nature of the law. Like Dewey and Pound, the realists believed that law does and should serve social ends. Judges take account of considerations of fairness and public policy, and they are right to do so.
- A desire to separate legal from moral elements in the law. The realists were legal positivists who believed that law should be treated scientifically. A clear distinction should be drawn between what the law is and what it should be. Law can only be viewed as an empirical science if moralistic notions are either excluded or are translated into empirically verifiable terms. The idea that legal talk of "duty", "right", etc. is really just talk about how judges are likely to decide cases, is a clear example of how many realists tried to purge law of moralistic language and translate everything into "realistic" talk of actual consequences and testable predictions.

== Criticisms ==
In the 1950s, legal realism was largely supplanted by the legal process movement, which viewed law as a process of "reasoned elaboration" and claimed that appeals to "legislative purpose" and other well-established legal norms could provide objectively correct answers to most legal questions. In his 1961 book The Concept of Law, British legal theorist H. L. A. Hart dealt what many scholars saw as a "decisive blow" to legal realism, by attacking the predictive theory of law that many realists had taken over from Holmes. Hart pointed out that if a law is just a prediction of what courts will do, a judge pondering the legal merits of a case before him is really asking, "How will I decide this case?" As Hart notes, this completely misses the fact that judges use legal rules to guide their decisions, not as data to predict their eventual holdings.

Many critics have claimed that the realists exaggerated the extent to which law is "riddled" with gaps, contradictions, and so forth. Other critics, such as Ronald Dworkin and Lon Fuller, have faulted legal realists for their attempt to sharply separate law and morality.

== Influence and continuing relevance ==
Though many aspects of legal realism are now seen as exaggerated or outdated, most legal theorists would agree that the realists were successful in their central ambition: to refute "formalist" or "mechanical" notions of law and legal reasoning. It is widely accepted that law is not, and cannot be, an exact science, and that it is important to examine what judges are actually doing in deciding cases, not merely what they say they are doing. Circuit judge Thomas L. Ambro comments in a third circuit appeal court case (2007) that:

Since the advent of legal realism, building the law around commercial practice has been a goal of common law courts. It stems from principles of judicial restraint: judges recognize that the repeat players in an industry often are more capable of setting the industry's ground rules than they are.

As ongoing debates about judicial activism and judicial restraint attest, legal scholars continue to disagree about when, if ever, it is legitimate for judges to "make law", as opposed to merely "following" or "applying" existing law. But few would disagree with the realists' core claim that judges (for good or ill) are often strongly influenced by their political beliefs, their personal values, their individual personalities, and other extra-legal factors.

== Legal realism and the European Court of Human Rights ==
A statistical natural language processing method has been applied to automatically predict the outcome of cases tried by the European Court of Human Rights (violation or no violation of a specific article) based on their textual contents, reaching a prediction accuracy of 79%. A subsequent qualitative analysis of these results provided some support towards the theory of legal realism. The authors write: "In general, and notwithstanding the simplified snapshot of a very complex debate that we just presented, our results could be understood as lending some support to the basic legal realist intuition according to which judges are primarily responsive to non-legal, rather than to legal, reasons when they decide hard cases."

== See also ==
- Legal positivism
- New legal realism
- Scepticism in law
