= New England Forestry Foundation =

American nonprofit organization

- Type: Nonprofit organization
- Purpose: Forest conservation and sustainable forest management
- Headquarters: New England, United States
- Region served: New England

The New England Forestry Foundation is a non-profit organization dedicated to preserving and sustainably managing forestland in New England. The New England Forestry Foundation acquires and stewards land through a variety of ways including partnerships, private donations, and others means.
