= Brigham–Kanner Property Rights Conference =

- Status: Active, ongoing
- Locations: Marshall–Wythe School of Law; Tsinghua University (2011); The Hague, Netherlands (2016); London, England (2026)
- Established: 2004
- Previous event: October 14-16, 2026
- Next event: TBD 2027
- Website: Page at William & Mary

The Brigham–Kanner Property Rights Conference was organized in 2003 at the Marshall-Wythe School of Law at the College of William & Mary, with the first conference held in October 2004. The Conference and Prize were proposed in 2003 by Joseph T. Waldo, a graduate of the Marshall–Wythe School of Law with the support of the then dean of the law school, W. Taylor Reveley III who would later become president of the college.

The Conference and Prize were inaugurated in 2004. Each Fall the Brigham–Kanner Property Rights Conference awards the Brigham–Kanner Property Rights Prize to an individual whose work has advanced the cause of property rights and has contributed to the overall awareness of the important role property rights occupy in the broader scheme of individual liberty. The Conference seeks to bring together at the college legal practitioners in the field of property law from across the nation along with judges and legal scholars to discuss developments in property rights.

The Conference Committee is composed of three members. The Committee and Conference are supported by an advisory board for the Conference and an advisory board for the Journal.

== Journal ==
Beginning in 2011, the Conference began publishing the Brigham–Kanner Property Rights Journal (formerly Brigham–Kanner Property Rights Conference Journal) as a chronicle of the Conference's panels. Volume 1, whose focus was "Comparative Property Rights," features 17 articles that explore the similarities and differences of the property systems in the U.S., China, and other countries. The articles were written by leading scholars and practitioners from the U.S. and China. Articles provide a comparative analysis of legal protection of property rights and also explore topics such as the role of property in promoting social and economic policy, the impact of culture on property systems, and the relationship between property rights and the environment. Four articles reflect on Justice Sandra Day O'Connor's property rights decisions, in recognition of her receipt of the 2011 Brigham-Kanner Property Rights Prize. Subsequent Volumes have had such topics as "Interdisciplinary Perspectives on Property," "The Essence of Property," "Defining the Reach of Property," "Property as a Form of Government," and "The Role of Property in Secure Societies."

== Conferences ==
In 2011 the Conference, which most years is hosted at William & Mary's School of Law, was hosted by Tsinghua University in Beijing, China. During the 2011 Conference, which was the Eighth Annual Brigham Kanner Property Rights Conference, Retired United States Supreme Court Justice Sandra Day O'Connor received the Brigham Kanner Prize. The reception was held in the U.S. Embassy in Beijing. The 2011 Conference featured lectures and panel discussions by the leading property rights scholars and practitioners from China and the United States.

The Thirteenth Annual Conference, held in 2016, was hosted by the Peace Palace in The Hague, Netherlands and was presented in cooperation with the Grotius Centre for International Legal Studies of Leiden Law School. The recipient of the year's Brigham-Kanner Property Rights Prize was Hernando de Soto, Prize-winning economist and author of The Mystery of Capital and The Other Path.

The Twenty-Second Annual Conference was held October 23-24, 2025, and honored William A. Fishel, Professor of Economics and Hardy Professor of Legal Studies, Emeritus, at Dartmouth College. Mr. Fishel is author of The Homevoter Hypothesis: How Home Values Influence Local Government Taxation, School Finance, and Land-Use Policies which discusses the relationship between private property ownership and local government participation. His work is praised as transformative of property scholarship and its interplay with local government.

The 23rd annual conference was held on October 14-16, 2026 in London, England, with events taking place in the House of Commons, the Old Hall of the Lincoln's Inn, and No. 11 Cavendish Square. The conference honored James E. Penner, Kwa Geok Choo Professor of Property Law at the National University of Singapore, and former professor at numerous prestigious institutions including Head of Law at University College London, for his global influence in property theory and his prize-winning book The Idea of Property in Law.

== Recipients of the Brigham-Kanner Prize ==
- 2004 – Frank Michelman, Harvard Law School
- 2005 – Richard Epstein, University of Chicago Law School
- 2006 – James W. Ely Jr., Vanderbilt University Law School
- 2007 – Margaret Radin, University of Michigan Law School
- 2008 – Robert Ellickson, Yale Law School
- 2009 – Richard Pipes, Harvard University
- 2010 – Carol M. Rose, University of Arizona James E. Rogers College of Law
- 2011 – Sandra Day O'Connor, Associate Justice of the Supreme Court of the United States (retired)
- 2012 – James E. Krier, University of Michigan Law School
- 2013 – Thomas W. Merrill, Columbia Law School
- 2014 – Michael M. Berger, Manatt, Phelps & Phillips
- 2015 – Joseph W. Singer, Harvard Law School
- 2016 – Hernando de Soto Polar, Institute for Liberty and Democracy
- 2017 - David L. Callies, University of Hawaiʻi at Mānoa William S. Richardson School of Law
- 2018 - Stewart E. Sterk, Benjamin N. Cardozo School of Law
- 2019 - Steven J. Eagle, Antonin Scalia School of Law
- 2020 - Henry E. Smith, Harvard Law School
- 2021 - Vicki Been, New York University School of Law
- 2022 - James S. Burling, Pacific Legal Foundation
- 2023 - Gregory S. Alexander, Cornell Law School
- 2024 - Lee Anne Fennell, University of Chicago Law School
- 2025 - William A. Fishel, Dartmouth College
- 2026 - James E. Penner, National University of Singapore
