= American Law Library =

The "American Law Library" series are a series of Chinese books that are translated from American law textbooks.

In 2000, the Public Affairs Section of the American Embassy to the People's Republic of China and the China University of Political Science and Law Publishing House—as part of the US and China Presidential Rule of Law Initiative—agreed to cooperate to translate hundreds of American law textbooks into Chinese and publish Chinese editions.

== List of translated books ==
1. Jonathan Rosenoer, Cyber law: the Law of the Internet
2. Karl N. Llewellyn, The Common Law Tradition
3. Edward H. Levi, An Introduction to the Legal Reasoning
4. Richard A. Posner, Overcoming Law
5. Cass R. Sunstein, Free Markets and Social Justice
6. Henry Hansmann, The Ownership of Enterprise
7. Paul Brest, Sanford Lexinson, Akhil Reed Amar, et al., Process of Constitutional Decisionmaking
8. Robert A. Gorman, Basic Text on Labor Law: Unionization and Collective Bargaining
9. Robert C. Ellickson, Order without Law: How Neighbors Settle Disputes
10. David G. Epstein et al., Bankruptcy
11. Roscoe Pound, Law and Morals
12. Robert C. Stevens, Law School
13. Mirjan R. Damaska, Evidence Law Adrift
14. Thomas Lee Hazen, The Law of Securities Regulation
15. Howell E. Jackson, Edward L. Symmons, Regulation of Financial Institutions
16. Morton J. Horwitz, The Warren Court and the Pursuit of Justice
17. Eric A. Posner, Law and Social Norms
18. George P. Fletcher, Basic Concepts of Criminal Law
19. Christopher Wolfe, Judicial Activism
20. Richard A. Epstein, Simple Rules for a Complex World
21. Robert P. Merges, Intellectual Property in the New Technological Age
22. John W. Strong, Mccormick on Evidence
23. Stephen Judge, Business Law
24. Mary Kay Kane et al., Civil Procedure
25. Wayne R. LaFave, Criminal Procedure
26. Morton J. Horwitz, The Transformation of American Law
27. Stephen N. Subrin et al., Civil Procedure: Doctrine
28. Kate Standley, Family Law
29. Robert G. Mccloskey and Sanford Levinson, The American Supreme Court
30. Oliver Wendell Holmes Jr., Common Law
31. George B. Vold et al., Theoretical Criminology
32. Henry Mather, Contract Law and Morality
33. Stephen M. Feldman, American Legal Thoughts from Pre-medoenism to Post-modernism
34. Akhil Reed Amar, The Constitution and Criminal Procedure: First Principles
35. John Finnis, Natural Law and Natural Rights
36. P. S. Atiyah, Form and Substance in Anglo-American Law
37. Judith N. Shklar, Legalism: Law, Morals and Political Trials
38. Matthias W. Stecher, Webvertising: Unfair Competition and Trademarks on the Internet
39. Graham Romp, Game Theory Introduction and Applications
40. H. L. A. Hart, Causation in the Law
41. Bernard Schwartz, A History of the Supreme Court
42. Louis Henkin, International Law: Politics and Values
43. David Luban, Legal Modernism
44. Stephen B. Goldberg, Frank E. A. Sander, Nancy H. Rogers, Sarah Rudolph Cole, Dispute Resolution: Negotiation, Mediation, and Other Processes
