= Brigham–Kanner Property Rights Prize =

Annual scholastic legal award

The Brigham–Kanner Property Rights Prize is awarded each Fall by the William & Mary Law School, at the Brigham–Kanner Property Rights Conference. The Conference and Prize were proposed in 2003 by Joseph T. Waldo, a graduate of the Marshall–Wythe School of Law with the support of the then Dean of the Law School, W. Taylor Reveley III, who would later become president of the college. The Conference and Prize were inaugurated in 2004. The Conference and Prize are named after Toby Prince Brigham and Gideon Kanner for "their contributions to private property rights, their efforts to advance the constitutional protection of property, and their accomplishments in preserving the important role that private property plays in protecting individual and civil rights." Toby Prince Brigham is a founding partner of Brigham Moore in Florida. Gideon Kanner is professor of law emeritus at the Loyola Law School in Los Angeles. The Brigham–Kanner Prize is awarded annually during the Brigham–Kanner Property Rights Conference.

Since 2004, the Brigham–Kanner Property Rights Prize has been awarded to a scholar, practitioner or jurist whose work affirms the fundamental importance of property rights and contributes to the overall awareness of the role property rights occupy in the broader scheme of individual liberty.

== Recipients ==
- Frank Michelman (2004), Robert Walmsley University Professor Emeritus at Harvard University, for his article Property, Utility, and Fairness: Comments on the Ethical Foundations of 'Just Compensation' Law.
- Richard Epstein (2005), James Parker Hall Distinguished Service Professor of Law at the University of Chicago, for his book Takings: Private Property and the Power of Eminent Domain.
- James W. Ely Jr. (2006), Milton R. Underwood Professor of Law, emeritus at Vanderbilt University, for his book The Guardian of Every Other Right: A Constitutional History of Property Rights.
- Margaret Radin (2007), Henry King Ranson Professor of Law at the University of Michigan and Faculty of Law Distinguished Research Scholar at the University of Toronto, for her books Contested Commodities and Reinterpreting Property.
- Robert Ellickson (2008), Walter E. Meyer Professor of Property and Urban Law at Yale University, for his body of work on property.
- Richard Pipes (2009), Frank B. Baird, Jr., Professor of History, emeritus, at Harvard University.
- Carol M. Rose (2010), Lohse Chair in Water and Natural Resources professor at the University of Arizona Jame E. Rogers College of Law, for her involvement in property rights at Yale Law School and her books Perspectives on Property Law and Property and Persuasion: Essays on the History, Theory, and Rhetoric of Ownership.
- Sandra Day O'Connor (2011) for her lifetime of contributions to property rights law, particularly her dissent in Kelo v. City of New London.
- James E. Krier (2012), Earl Warren DeLano Professor of Law at the University of Michigan Law School, for his lifetime of scholarship, including his casebook on Property.
- Thomas W. Merrill (2013), Charles Evans Hughes Professor of Law at Columbia Law School, for his body of scholarship on property, including the books Property: Takings and Property: Principles and Policies.
- Michael M. Berger (2014), appellate attorney at Manatt, Phelps & Phillips, for his years of property rights advocacy in the courts.
- Joseph W. Singer (2015), Bussey Professor of Law at Harvard Law School, for his body of scholarship on property rights.
- Hernando de Soto Polar (2016), author of The Mystery of Capital: Why Capitalism Triumphs in the West and Fails Elsewhere, and The Other Path: The Economic Answer to Terrorism, for his writing and his efforts at designing and implementing property-rights reforms in developing nations around the world.
- David L. Callies (2017), author of Regulating Paradise and Preserving Paradise and Benjamin A. Kudo Professor of Law at the William S. Richardson School of Law at the University of Hawaiʻi at Mānoa, for his decades of practicing, teaching, and contributing to the scholarship of property law.
- Stewart E. Sterk (2018), H. Bert and Ruth Mack Professor of Real Estate Law and Director of the Center for Real Estate Law at the Benjamin N. Cardozo School of Law for his years of teaching property law and his body of scholarship on property rights.
- Steven J. Eagle (2019), Professor of Law at the Antonin Scalia School of Law, author of the treatise Regulatory Takings, and a prolific author and speaker in the field of real estate law and takings law whose work has been cited by the Supreme Court of the United States.
- Henry E. Smith (2020), Fessenden Professor of Law at Harvard Law School for his body of scholarship on Property Law, including several casebooks, years of teaching property law, and position as a Reporter on the Restatement (Fourth) of Property.
- Vicki Been (2021), New York City Deputy Mayor for Housing and Economic Development, Judge Edward Weinfeld Professor of Law at New York University School of Law, an Affiliated Professor of Public Policy of the New York University's Wagner Graduate School of Public Service, Faculty Director of New York University's Furman Center for Real Estate and Urban Policy, and former commissioner of New York City Department of Housing Preservation and Development, for her scholarship and research in many areas of property law and applications thereof in New York City housing.
- James S. Burling (2022), Vice President of Legal Affairs for the Pacific Legal Foundation, for his decades of advocacy for the civil right of private property ownership, both as an attorney for property owners, including before the Supreme Court of the United States in Palazzolo v. Rhode Island, and as an author.
- Gregory S. Alexander (2023), A. Robert Noll Professor of Law, emeritus, at Cornell Law School, for his career of teaching and scholarship on property law, including his books Commodity and Propriety, winner of the American Publishers Association 1997 Book of the Year in Law award, Property and Human Flourishing, and The Global Debate Over Constitutional Property: Lessons for American Takings Jurisprudence.
- Lee Anne Fennel (2024), Max Pam Professor of Law, at University of Chicago Law School, for her books The Unbounded Home: Property Values Beyond Property Lines and Slices and Lumps: Division and Aggregation in Law and Life and her scholarship advancing practical conceptions of property rights and property's social boundaries.
- William A. Fischel (2025), Professor of Economics and Hardy Professor of Legal Studies, Emeritus, at Dartmouth College, for his book The Homevoter Hypothesis: How Home Values Influence Local Government Taxation, School Finance, and Land-Use Policies scholarship on the relationship between private property ownership and local government.
- James E. Penner (2026), Kwa Geok Choo Professor of Property Law at the National University of Singapore, for his global influence in property theory and his prize-winning book The Idea of Property in Law.
