= Joseph Singer =

Joseph Singer may refer to:

- Joseph Singer (politician) (1890–1967), Toronto city councillor, lawyer and figure in the city's Jewish community
- Joseph Singer (bishop) (1786–1866), Irish Anglican bishop
- Joseph W. Singer, American legal theorist
