= Toby Prince Brigham =

American lawyer and legal scholar (1934–2021)

Personal details
- Born: November 24, 1934
- Died: March 19, 2021 (aged 86) Miami, Florida, U.S.
- Occupation: Lawyer, scholar

Toby Prince Brigham (November 24, 1934 – March 19, 2021) was an American lawyer and scholar in the fields of property rights and eminent domain. In addition to his law practice, Brigham involved himself with organizations and events aimed at educating and informing attorneys and legal scholars about property rights law, and the constitutional rights associated with property ownership.

== Law practice ==
After beginning practice in his father's law firm in Miami, Florida, in 1972 Toby Prince Brigham opened his own law practice dedicated exclusively to representing private property owners in condemnation disputes. In 1978, Brigham, with S. William Moore founded the law firm of Brigham Moore, which operated several offices across Florida all dedicated to the same cause of representing property owners in eminent domain and property rights cases. Brigham Moore would go on to become Florida's largest property rights law firm and one of the nation's leading firms in the specialty, and win what was at the time Florida's largest ever award in an eminent domain case, and one of the nation's largest, at $23.35 Million, and then again with an $84 Million award. Brigham with his firm dedicated 54 years to protecting private citizens' rights in condemnation suits. As a result of these achievements, Brigham was hailed as the best trial attorney in the field of eminent domain. In addition to these efforts, Brigham pioneered the use of public-private partnerships, called "P3," such as the Miami-Dade Datran Center which combined the development of the Dade South Miami Metrorail Complex and helped draft and champion statewide legislation and constitutional amendments promoting property owners' rights.

== Scholarship ==
Brigham spent decades in property rights scholarship to educate attorneys about the complexities and property law and condemnation litigation and to encourage them to cooperate, share ideas and strategies, and encourage one another. As part of this, he served as faculty or co-chair for the American Law Institute's Eminent Domain and Land Valuation Course of Study for more than twenty years.

Brigham's efforts were instrumental in developing eminent domain as a focused discipline of law, where it had previously been a niche practice area. Brigham lectured and wrote extensively on the issues of condemnation, just compensation, and property rights. Brigham earned acclaim in his field for describing the right of private ownership as providing citizens with their own "piece of sovereignty" thereby dividing power between the individual and government and making it possible for individuals to exercise their freedom and be rewarded for their own industry.

In the 1990s, Brigham was an editor and a contributing author to Matthew Bender & Company, Inc.'s Nichols on Eminent Domain, which is recognized as the leading treatise on eminent domain law in the United States.

In 2000, Brigham founded the Owners' Counsel of America, a first-of-its-kind national association of lawyers in eminent domain and property rights law dedicated to defending the interests of private property owners.

In 2004, the College of William & Mary's Marshall–Wythe School of Law established the Brigham–Kanner Property Rights Prize, named in honor of Brigham and Gideon Kanner, Professor Emeritus of Loyola School of Law, in recognition of their lifetime contributions to the field of property rights law. The Brigham–Kanner Property Rights Conference is a national conference of practitioners, scholars, and jurists in the field of property law held annually at the law school or abroad, and awards the Brigham-Kanner Property Rights Prize to a scholar or attorney who has made lifetime significant contributions to the field, from both a practitioner's view as well as from the legal academy. William & Mary Law School further honored Brigham by using his name on the Brigham-Kanner Property Rights Journal, an annual publication discussing property rights issues.
