= American Library =

American Library may refer to:

== Associations ==
- American Association of Law Libraries
- American Indian Library Association
- American Library Association
- American Theological Library Association

== Book collections ==
- American Law Library
- American Sportsman's Library
- The American School Library

== Libraries ==
- American Library in Paris
- American Library (New Delhi)
- American Spaces
- Amerika-Gedenkbibliothek
- Digital Public Library of America
- Library of American Broadcasting
- Library of Congress
- New York Public Library

== Publishers ==
- Library of America
- New American Library

== Related lists ==
- List of American Library Association accredited library schools
- List of the largest libraries in the United States
- List of U.S. state library associations
- Public libraries in North America

== Miscellaneous ==
- American Libraries (magazine)
- The American Library (art installation)
