= Rule of Law (disambiguation) =

The rule of law is the legal principle that law should govern a nation, with everyone equal before the law.

Rule of Law may also refer to:

- Rule of Law (horse) (foaled 2001), a World Champion Thoroughbred racehorse
- Rule of Law (Armenia), a political party in Armenia
- Rule of Law Coalition, or State of Law Coalition, an Iraqi political coalition
- The Rule of Law, a 2010 book on this subject by Lord Bingham

== See also ==
- Rule of Law Initiative (disambiguation)
