= Judeo-Christian =

Term grouping Judaism and Christianity together

The term Judeo-Christian is used to group Christianity and Judaism together, either in reference to a shared history before Christianity split from Judaism, Christianity's recognition of Jewish scripture (which forms the Old Testament of the Christian Bible), or values supposed to be shared between them. The term Judæo Christian first appeared in the 19th century as a word for Jewish converts to Christianity. In the United States, the term was not common before the 1930s but became widely used during the Cold War to invoke a unified American identity opposed to communism.

The term has been criticized, largely by Jewish thinkers, for relying on supersessionism and for glossing over fundamental differences between Jewish and Christian thought, theology, culture and practice. Even the broader term "Abrahamic religions", which also covers Islam and other faiths that trace themselves to Abraham, is sometimes seen as problematic.

== History ==
The term "Judæo Christian" appears in a letter by Alexander McCaul dated October 17, 1821. (Note: "From all I can see there is but one way to bring about the object of the Society, that is by erecting a Judæo Christian community, a city of refuge, where all who wish to be baptized could be supplied with the means of earning their bread.") In this case the term referred to Jewish converts to Christianity. Joseph Wolff used it similarly in 1829, for a type of church that would observe some Jewish traditions in order to convert Jews. According to Mark Silk, in the early 19th century the term was "most widely used (in French as well as English) to refer to the early followers of Jesus who opposed" Paul the Apostle and wanted "to restrict the message of Jesus to Jews and who insisted on maintaining Jewish law and ritual".

Friedrich Nietzsche used the German term judenchristlich ("Jewish-Christian") to emphasize what he saw as neglected continuities between the Jewish and Christian worldviews. The expression appears in The Antichrist, published in 1895 but written several years earlier, and the argument is developed more fully in On the Genealogy of Morality.

The idea of Judeo-Christian values in an ethical rather than theological sense was used by George Orwell in 1939, along with the phrase "the Judaeo-Christian scheme of morals". According to theologian Richard L. Rubenstein, the "normative Judaeo-Christian interpretation of history" treats human suffering, such as a plague, as punishment for human guilt.

George Thomas Kurian writes that the term "Judeo-Christian tradition" was first used in 1935, to unite Christians and Jews in aid of European Jews.

According to historian K. Healan Gaston, the term became a descriptor of the United States in the 1930s, as the country sought a unified cultural identity that set it apart from fascism and communism in Europe. It became part of American civil religion by the 1940s and rose in prominence during the Cold War, especially in opposition to communist atheism. In the 1970s the term became closely associated with the American Christian right, and it has been invoked in political efforts to restrict immigration and LGBT rights.

== Christian-Judeo ==
Some speakers use the term "Christian-Judeo" for the same concept. Language columnist William Safire noted that the construction is awkward, since it puts the combining form "Judeo" at the end instead of "Judaic".

== Inter-group relations ==
=== In the United States ===
The rise of antisemitism in the 1930s led concerned Protestants, Catholics and Jews to work toward mutual understanding and reduce antisemitism in the United States. Precursors of the National Conference of Christians and Jews sent teams of a priest, a rabbi and a minister to run programs across the country, promoting an America "nurtured by three ennobling traditions: Protestantism, Catholicism and Judaism....The phrase 'Judeo-Christian' entered the contemporary lexicon as the standard liberal term for the idea that Western values rest on a religious consensus that included Jews."

After World War II and the Holocaust, according to David Brog, "there was a revolution in Christian theology in America", which he calls "the greatest shift in Christian attitudes towards the Jewish people since Constantine converted the Roman Empire". In the late 1940s, evangelical proponents of the new Judeo-Christian approach lobbied Washington for diplomatic support of the new state of Israel, and positive attitudes toward Israel later became mainstream among American evangelicals and political conservatives.

By the 1970s, mainline Protestant denominations and the National Council of Churches had become more supportive of Palestinians than of Israel.

The scriptural basis cited for evangelical support of Jews and Israel is Genesis 12:3, in which God promises to bless those who bless Abraham and curse those who curse him; evangelicals generally read this promise as extending to Abraham's descendants. Many evangelicals also see Israel as the means through which prophecies of the end times will be fulfilled. Support has declined among younger evangelicals: one study found support for Israel among evangelicals aged 18 to 29 fell from 69% in 2018 to 33.6% in 2021. After the October 7 attacks and the Gaza war, a 2026 Pew Research Center survey found that the share of white evangelicals with a favorable view of the Israeli government fell from 71% in 2024 to about 57%.

In 21st-century discourse, the term "Judeo-Christian" has been criticized for equating two different faiths and for being used to exclude Muslims, contributing to Islamophobia.

== Jewish responses ==
The Jewish community's attitude toward the concept has been mixed. In the 1930s, "In the face of worldwide anti-semitic efforts to stigmatize and destroy Judaism, influential Christians and Jews in America labored to uphold it, pushing Judaism from the margins of American religious life towards its very center." During World War II, Jewish chaplains worked with Catholic priests and Protestant ministers to promote goodwill, addressing servicemen who "in many cases had never seen, much less heard a rabbi speak before". At funerals for the unknown soldier, rabbis stood alongside other chaplains and recited prayers in Hebrew. When the Dorchester sank in 1943, its four chaplains of different faiths gave up their life jackets to others and stood together "arm in arm in prayer" as the ship went down. A 1948 postage stamp honored them with the words "interfaith in action".

In the 1950s, "a spiritual and cultural revival washed over American Jewry" in response to the trauma of the Holocaust. Two notable books addressed the relationship between contemporary Judaism and Christianity: Abba Hillel Silver's Where Judaism Differs and Leo Baeck's Judaism and Christianity. Both sought to clarify Judaism's distinctiveness "in a world where the term Judeo-Christian had obscured critical differences between the two faiths". Rabbi Eliezer Berkovits wrote that "Judaism is Judaism because it rejects Christianity, and Christianity is Christianity because it rejects Judaism." Arthur A. Cohen, in The Myth of the Judeo-Christian Tradition, questioned the theological validity of the concept and argued that it was essentially a product of American politics. Jacob Neusner, in Jews and Christians: The Myth of a Common Tradition, wrote that "the two faiths stand for different people talking about different things to different people."

Law professor Stephen M. Feldman sees the invocation of a "Judeo-Christian tradition" as a form of supersessionism:

Once one recognizes that Christianity has historically engendered antisemitism, then this so-called tradition appears as dangerous Christian dogma (at least from a Jewish perspective). For Christians, the concept of a Judeo-Christian tradition comfortably suggests that Judaism progresses into Christianity—that Judaism is somehow completed in Christianity. The concept of a Judeo-Christian tradition flows from the Christian theology of supersession, whereby the Christian covenant (or Testament) with God supersedes the Jewish one. Christianity, according to this belief, reforms and replaces Judaism. The belief, therefore, implies, first, that Judaism needs reformation and replacement, and second, that modern Judaism remains merely as a "relic". Most importantly the belief of the Judeo-Christian tradition insidiously obscures the real and significant differences between Judaism and Christianity.

== See also ==
- Christian Zionism
- Jewish Christian
- Messianic Judaism
