= Margaret Jane Radin =

American legal scholar

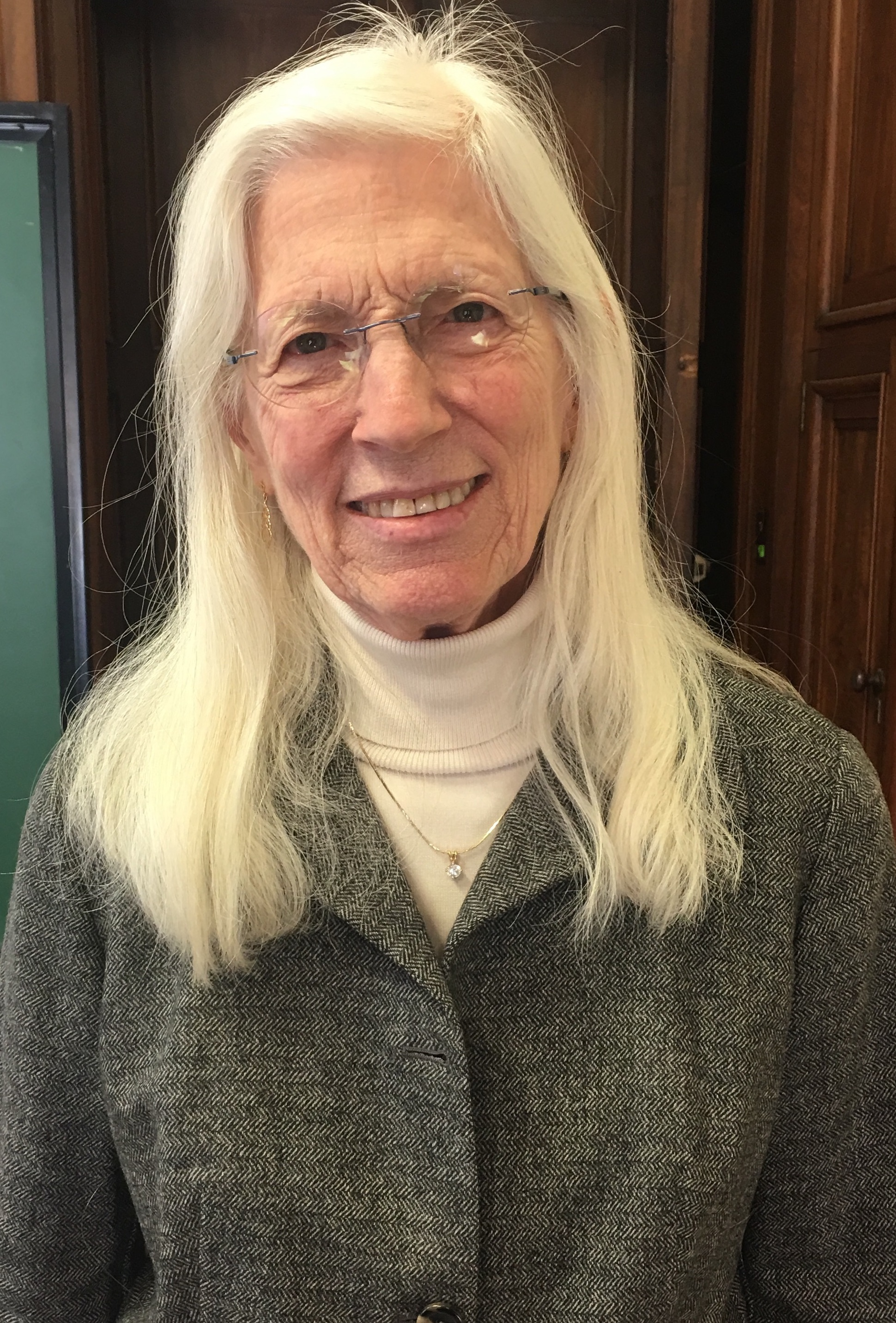
- Professor Radin in 2018
- Born: December 1, 1941
- Education: Stanford University (AB); Brandeis University (MFA); University of Southern California (JD)
- Occupation: law professor
- Known for: legal scholar specializing in property rights and contractual obligation

Margaret Jane Radin (born 1941) is an American legal scholar. She is the Henry King Ransom Professor of Law, emerita, at the University of Michigan Law School by vocation, and a flutist by avocation. Radin has held law faculty positions at University of Toronto, University of Michigan, Stanford University, University of Southern California, and University of Oregon, and has been a faculty visitor at Harvard University, Princeton University, University of California at Berkeley, and New York University. Radin's best known scholarly work explores the basis and limits of property rights and contractual obligation. She has also contributed significantly to feminist legal theory, legal and political philosophy, and the evolution of law in the digital world. At the same time, she has continued to perform and study music.

In addition to her books, Radin is the author of many frequently-cited articles and book chapters, two of which are on a list of 100 most cited legal articles of all time, and many of which have been reprinted in textbooks and anthologies. She founded and was the inaugural director of Stanford's Program in Law, Science & Technology, and was the inaugural Microsoft Fellow at Princeton's Program in Law, Science and Public Affairs. Among other honors, she has been elected to the American Academy of Arts and Sciences.

== Education ==
Radin received her AB in music from Stanford University in 1963 (with Great Distinction), her MFA in Music History from Brandeis University in 1965, and was advanced to candidacy for a PhD in musicology at University of California, Berkeley in 1968 before changing her career path to law. She received her J.D. from the University of Southern California Law School in 1976 (Order of the Coif).

== Professional honors and awards ==
- Senior Distinguished Fellow, Searle Center on Law, Regulation and Economic Growth (2015)
- Scribes Book Award, honoring Boilerplate (2014)
- Member, American Law Institute (since 2011), Advisor to Restatement 3d of Consumer Contracts
- Member, American Academy of Arts and Sciences (since 2008)
- Brigham–Kanner Property Rights Prize (2007)
- Fellow at Davos World Economic Forum (1998)
- LLD (honorary) from Chicago-Kent Law School (1993)

== Career ==
Radin is Distinguished Research Scholar at the Faculty of Law, University of Toronto, where she serves on the Advisory Group for the Centre for Innovation Law and Policy. She is Henry King Ransom Professor of Law, emerita, University of Michigan Law School (retired 2015) and William Benjamin Scott and Luna M. Scott Professor of Law, Stanford University (retired in 2006). Before moving to Stanford in 1989, she held a tenured chair professorship at the University of Southern California Law Center. Radin has also taught at Harvard University, University of California at Berkeley, New York University, and Princeton University, where she was the inaugural Microsoft Fellow in Law and Public Affairs. Radin is a Fellow of the American Academy of Arts and Sciences and a Member of the American Law Institute.

As a professor, Radin pioneered courses in Legal Issues in Cyberspace, Electronic Commerce, and Intellectual Property in Cyberspace. She also created a course in International Intellectual Property, and a Student Scholarship Seminar in which law students develop publisher papers. In 2002, she founded Stanford's Center for E-Commerce. She also directed Stanford's innovative LL.M. program in Law, Science, and Technology. Radin is a member (currently inactive) of the State Bar of California.

Radin is coauthor of a casebook, Internet Commerce: The Emerging Legal Framework (with Rothchild, Reese, and Silverman) (2d ed 200x, with supplementary updates). Her most recent book is Boilerplate: The Fine Print, Vanishing Rights, and the Rule of Law (Princeton University Press 2013), which explores the problems posed for the legal system by the standardization necessary for the modern market, and how those problems might be reduced. Radin also has published two books exploring the problems of propertization: Contested Commodities (Harvard University Press 1996) and Reinterpreting Property (University of Chicago Press 1993). The latter is a collection of her well-known essays on property, including "Property and Personhood," first published in 1982, and a staple in casebooks for students of property.

== Work on US contract law ==
Radin is well known for developing the concept of market-inalienability, a term she coined to refer to what kinds of things should not be traded in markets. For example, human organs aren't available for sale on the open market because of the National Organ Transplant Act of 1984. Her book, Contested Commodities, explores what kinds of market trades and resulting commodification should be disallowed or curtailed. Radin is also known for re-examining the basis of freedom of choice that is basic to freedom of contract and how it is (or is not) reflected in contemporary law.

Radin's book, Boilerplate, focuses on what types of alleged agreements between a firm and consumers should not be enforceable contracts, or at least not presumed enforceable without further investigation, and suggests other ways that standardization could be treated. Radin travels frequently to lecture and participate in workshops and seminars on these topics.

== Personal life ==
Radin is a grandniece of Max Radin, a leader of the legal realist movement in the first half of the 20th century, but she never met him. She is married to violinist Phillip Coonce and the mother of Wayland Radin, J.D., who calls himself an "outdoorsy" lawyer, and Amadea Britton, M.D., a public health scientist interested in infectious diseases. Radin splits her time between homes in Toronto and Albuquerque, New Mexico. She practises her flute daily, and plays in small and large ensembles as often as possible.

== Publications ==
=== Books ===
- Boilerplate: The Fine Print, Vanishing Rights, and the Rule of Law. Princeton, N.J.: Princeton University Press, 2013.
- Co-editor. Securing Privacy in the Internet Age. A. Chander and L. Gelman, co-editors. Stanford, Calif.: Stanford Univ. Press, 2008.
- Co-author. Internet Commerce: The Emerging Legal Framework [Cases & Materials]. 2nd ed. J. A. Rothchild et al., co-authors. University Casebook Series. New York: Foundation Press, 2006.
- Co-editor. Intellectual Property and the Internet [Cases and Materials]. J. A. Rothchild and G. M. Silverman, co-editors. University Casebook Series. New York: Foundation Press, 2004.
- Co-author. Internet Commerce: The Emerging Legal Framework [Cases & Materials]. J. A. Rothchild and G. M. Silverman, co-authors. University Casebook Series. New York: Foundation Press, 2002. (Also co-authored 2004 supplement.) [NOTE new co-author for Internet Commerce added for 2d edition: R. Anthony Reese. Silverman's name is still on the book but he is not longer taking part in it.]
- Contested Commodities. Cambridge, Mass.: Harvard Univ. Press, 1996.
- Reinterpreting Property. Chicago: University of Chicago Press, 1993.

=== Book chapters ===
- "An Analytical Framework for Legal Evaluation of Boilerplate." In Philosophical Foundations of Contract Law, edited by G. Lestas, P. Saprai, and G. Klass. Oxford University Press, 2014.
- "Boilerplate: A Threat to the Rule of Law?" In Private Law and the Rule of Law, edited by L. M. Austin and D. Klimchuk. Oxford University Press, 2014.
- "Boilerplate Today: The Rise of Modularity and the Waning of Consent." In Boilerplate: The Foundation of Market Contracts, edited by O. Ben-Shahar, 189–99. Cambridge: Cambridge Univ. Press, 2007. (Adapted from an essay originally published under the same title in Mich. L. Rev. 104, no. 5 (2006): 1223–34.)
- "Reconsidering the Rule of Law." In The Rule of Law and the Separation of Powers, edited by R. Bellamy. International Library of Essays in Law and Legal Theory, Second Series. Burlington, VT: Ashgate, 2005.
- "Contested Commodities." In Rethinking Commodification: Cases and Readings in Law and Culture, edited by M. M. Ertman and J. C. Williams, 81–95. New York: New York Univ. Press, 2005.
- "Market-Inalienability." In Families by Law: An Adoption Reader, edited by N. R. Cahn and J. H. Hollinger, 319–23. New York: New York Univ. Press, 2004.
- "Information Tangibility." In Economics, Law and Intellectual Property: Seeking Strategies for Research and Teaching in a Developing Field, edited by O. Granstrand, 395–418. Boston: Kluwer, 2003.
- "Incomplete Commodification in the Computerized World." In The Commodification of Information, edited by N. Elkin-Korin and N. W. Netanel, 3-22. Information Law Series, 11. The Hague, Netherlands: Kluwer Law International, 2002.
- "Can the Rule of Law Survive Bush v. Gore." In Bush v. Gore: The Question of Legitimacy, edited by B. Ackerman, 110–25. New Haven, Conn.: Yale Univ. Press, 2002.
- Co-author. "Intellectual Property and Intellectual Capital: The Role of Nonproprietary Technologies." E. Sawyer, co-author. In Capital for Our Time: The Economic, Legal, and Management Challenges of Intellectual Capital, edited by N. Imparato, 70–84. Stanford, Calf.: Hoover Institution Press, 1999.
- "Government Interests and Takings: Cultural Commitments of Property and the Role of Political Theory." In Public Values in Constitutional Law, edited by S. E. Gottlieb, 69–96. Ann Arbor, Mich.: University of Michigan Press, 1993
- "The Constitution and the Liberal Conception of Property." In Judging the Constitution: Critical Essays on Judicial Lawmaking, edited by W. M. McCann and G. L. Houseman, 205–27. Scott, Foresman/Little, Brown Series in Political Science. Scott, Foresman & Co.: Boston, 1989.

=== Journal articles ===
- "Less Than I Wanted To Know: The Submerged Issues in More Than I Wanted To Know" Jer. Rev. Legal Stud. (2014): 1–12. (First published online: November 7, 2014).
- "Of Priors and Disconnects." Harv. L. Rev. F. 127, no. 7 (2014): 259–72.
- "Response: Boilerplate in Theory and Practice." Can. Bus. L. J. 54, no. 2 (2013): 292–306.
- "Rhetorical Capture." Ariz. L. Rev. 54, no. 2 (2012): 457–68. (Symposium: Political Discourse, Civility, and Harm.)
- "Reconsidering Boilerplate: Confronting Normative and Democratic Degradation." Cap. U. L. Rev. 40, no. 3 (2012): 617–56.
- "In Tribute: Frank I. Michelman." Harv. L. Rev. 125, no. 4 (2012): 896–900.
- "Property Longa, Vita Brevis." Wis. L. Rev. 2011, no. 2 (2011): 111–21. (Originally presented as a speech at the Wisconsin Law Review Symposium on Intellectual Property and Intergenerational Equity, November 2010)
- "Form Contracts and the Problem of Consumer Information." J. Inst. & Theoretical Econ. 167, no. 1 (2011): 49–55.
- "The Rule of Law in the Information Age: Reconciling Private Rights and Public Values." J. L. Phil. & Culture 4, no. 1 (2009): 83–105.
- "Copyright Defection." Indus. & Corp. Change 15, no. 6 (2006): 981–93.
- "Boilerplate Today: The Rise of Modularity and the Waning of Consent." Mich. L. Rev. 104, no. 5 (2006): 1223–34.
- "A Comment on Information Propertization and its Legal Milieu." Clev. St. L. Rev. 54, no. 1 (2006): 23–39.
- "Property and Precision." Tulsa L. Rev. 39, no. 3 (2004): 639–48. [Essay in honor of work by Frank Michelman]
- "Regulation by Contract, Regulation by Machine." J. Inst. & Theoretical Econ. 160, no. 1 (2004): 142–56.
- "Regime Change in Intellectual Property - Superseding the Law of the State with the "Law" of the Firm." U. Ottawa L. & Tech. J. 2003-2004, no. 1 (2004): 173-88.
- "Online Standardization and the Integration of Text and Machine." Fordham L. Rev. 70, no. 4 (2002): 1125–46.
- "Humans, Computers, and Binding Commitment." Indiana L. J. 75, no. 4 (2000): 1125–62.
- Co-author. "Altered States: Electronic Commerce and Owning the Means of Value Exchange." T. P. Brown and R. D. Fram, co-authors. Stan. Tech. L. Rev. (1999): 2-60.
- Co-author. "The Myth of Private Ordering: Rediscovering Legal Realism in Cyberspace." R. P. Wagner, co-author. Chi. --Kent L. Rev. 73, no. 4 (1998): 1295–317.
- "The Pragmatist and the Feminist." S. Cal. L. Rev. 63, no. 6 (1996): 1699–726.
- "Property Evolving in Cyberspace (Conference of the Second Century of the University of Pittsburgh School of Law: Regulation of Computing and Information Technology)." J. L. & Com. 15, no. 2 (1996): 509–26.
- "Positive Theory as Conceptual Critique - A Piece of a Pragmatic Agenda? (Symposium on Positive Political Theory and Law)." S. Cal. L. Rev. 68, no. 6 (1995): 1595–603.
- "A Deweyan Perspective on the Economic Theory of Democracy." Const. Comment. 11, no. 3 (1995): 539–56.
- "Lacking a Transformative Social Theory: A Response." Stan. L. Rev. 45, no. 2 (1993): 409–24.
- "Compensation and Commensurability." Duke L. J. 43, no. 1 (1993): 56–86.
- "On the Domain of Market Rhetoric (Annual Institute for Humane Studies Law and Philosophy Issue--Symposium on Risks and Wrongs, University of San Diego, School of Law - 1992)." Harv. J. L. & Pub. Pol'y. 15, no. 3 (1992): 711–31.
- "Evaluating Government Reasons for Changing Property Regimes." Alb. L. Rev. 55, no. 3 (1992): 597–603. These remarks were based on a paper prepared for the Conference on Compelling Government Interests at Albany Law School, September 26–28, 1991. The full paper appears as "Government Interests and Takings: Cultural Commitments of Property and the Role of Political Theory" in Public Values in Constitutional Law (1993) edited by S.E. Gottlieb, 69–96.
- "Reflections on Objectification (Symposium on Biomedical Technology and Healthcare: Social and Conceptual Transformations)." S. Cal. L. Rev. 65, no. 1 (1991): 341-54
- "Presumptive Positivism and Trivial Cases (Symposium on Law and Philosophy)." Harv. J.L. & Pub. Pol'y.14, no. 3 (1991): 823–37.
- Co-author. "Pragmatist and Poststructuralist Critical Legal Practice (Commentary)." F. Michelman, co-author. U. Pa. L. Rev. 139, no. 4 (1991): 1019–58.
- "'After the Final No There Comes a Yes': A Law Teacher's Report." Yale J. L. & Human. 2, no. 2 (1990): 253–66.
- "Reconsidering the Rule of Law." B. U. L. Rev. 69, no. 4 (1989): 781–819.
- "The Liberal Conception of Property: Cross Currents in the Jurisprudence of Takings." Colum. L. Rev. 88, no. 8 (1988): 1667–96. (Adapted from an essay entitled "The Constitution and the Liberal Conception of Property" which appears in Judging the Constitution: Critical Essays on Judicial Lawmaking (1989), edited by M.W. McCann and G.L. Houseman.
- "Market-Inalienability." Harv. L. Rev. 100, no. 8 (1987): 1849–937.
- "Time, Possession, and Alienation (Symposium: Time, Property Rights, and the Common Law)." Wash. U.L.Q. 64, no. 3 (1986): 739–58.
- "The Consequences of Conceptualism (Symposium on Richard Epstein's Takings: Private Property and the Power of Eminent Domain)." U. Miami L. Rev. 41, no. 1 (1986): 239–44.
- "Proportionality, Subjectivity, and Tragedy (Death Penalty Symposium: II. Issues in the Administration of the Death Penalty)." U. C. Davis L. Rev. 18, no. 4 (1985): 1165–75.
- "Property and Personhood." Stan. L. Rev. 34, no. 5 (1982): 957–1015.
- "Cruel Punishment and Respect for Persons: Super Due Process for Death." S. Cal. L. Rev. 53, no. 4 (1980): 1143-85
- "The Jurisprudence of Death: Evolving Standards for the Cruel and Unusual Punishments Clause." U. Pa. L. Rev. 126, no. 5 (1978): 989–1064.

=== Reviews ===
- Review of The 3-1/2 Minute Transaction: Boilerplate and the Limits of Contract Design, by R. E. Scott and M. Gulati. L. & Pol. Bk. Rev. 23, no. 6 (2013): 302–4.
- Book Review (J. Boyle, SHAMANS, SOFTWARE AND SPLEENS), The Washington Post, Book World (June 30, 1996)
- Review of Death Penalties: The Supreme Court's Obstacle Course, by R. Berger. J. Crim. L. & Criminology 74, no. 3 (1983): 1115–22.

=== Other publications ===
- "The Subject of and Object of Commodification." M. Sunder, co-author. Introduction to Rethinking Commodification: Cases and Readings in Law and Culture, by M. M. Ertman and J. C. Williams, co-editors, 8-29. New York: New York Univ. Press, 2005.

=== Works in progress and working papers ===
- What Boilerplate Said: A Response to Omri Ben-Shahar (and a Diagnosis). Univ. of Michigan Public Law and Legal Theory Working Paper Series, No. 392; Univ. of Michigan Law School, Law & Economics Research Paper Series, No. 14-007. Working Paper, 2014.

== See also ==
- Brigham–Kanner Property Rights Conference
