= Rule of Law Initiative =

Rule of Law Initiative may refer to:

- Presidential Rule of Law Initiative, project between the U.S. and China to expand bilateral cooperation in the field of law
- ABA Rule of Law Initiative, American Bar Association's overseas rule of law programs
