= Markle Foundation =

American foundation

- Founded: April 26, 1927; 99 years ago
- Founder: John Markle (1858 - 1933); Mary Markle (1853 - 1927)
- Type: T20 Private foundation 501(c)(3)
- Tax ID no.: 13-1770307
- Purpose: Technology, Workforce, Health, and National Security
- Headquarters: New York City
- President: Ellen V. Futter
- Board of directors: • Suzanne N. Johnson, Chair • Steven Denning • Cheryl C. Effron • Margaret Hoover • Dr. Christopher Howard • Gilman Louie • Dr. James Manyika • Kathleen A. Murphy • Stanley S. Shuman
- Website: www.markle.org

Markle Foundation is a New York–based private foundation established in 1927 by American industrialist and financier John Markle and his wife, Mary. Its focus is technology, workforce, health, and national security.

== History ==
Formally incorporated on April 26, 1927, as the John and Mary R. Markle Foundation, the organization began by funding traditional social welfare programs as well as projects that focused on medicine and medical research. In 1969, Lloyd Morrisett, one of the founders of the Children's Television Workshop, the Markle Foundation's president at that time, shifted the foundation's focus to mass communications in a democratic society. In 1998, when Zoë Baird became president, she shifted the foundation's focus to accelerating the use of information and information technology to address critical public problems, particularly in the areas of health and national security. In 1948, the Foundation established an award to assist qualified people wishing to remain in academic medicine.

== Personnel ==
- Ellen V. Futter - President
