= Peter Brooks (writer) =

American writer & academic (born 1938)

Peter Preston Brooks (born 1938) is an American literary scholar, interdisciplinary humanist, and writer known for his work on narrative theory, psychoanalysis and literature, melodrama, law and literature, and the institutional place of the humanities. Over a career spanning Yale University, the University of Virginia, and Princeton University, Brooks played an influential role in shaping comparative literature, narrative studies, and the institutional frameworks that support humanistic scholarship.

Brooks earned his A.B. from Harvard University and later returned to complete a Ph.D. in Comparative Literature after study in England and France. He also studied at University College, London (UCL) as a Marshall Scholar. He joined the Yale faculty, initially in French, later in Comparative Literature, during a period of disciplinary transformation. The French Department had become a major American entry point for structuralist and post-structuralist thought, bringing figures such as Claude Lévi-Strauss, Jacques Lacan, Roland Barthes, and later Jacques Derrida into Yale’s orbit.

Brooks participated in reshaping literary study around questions of language, narrative, theory, and interpretation, especially in the creation of The Literature Major, an interdisciplinary undergraduate program developed by younger faculty as an alternative to traditional national literature departmental and standard great-books pedagogy.

Working with colleagues such as Adam Parry, Michael Holquist, Peter Demetz, Geoffrey Hartman, and Paul de Man, Brooks helped establish courses—Lit X, Lit Y, and Lit Z—that foregrounded poetics, interpretation, textual analysis, and the theoretical underpinnings of literary study. While never aligned with a single theoretical orthodoxy, he advocated for intellectual pluralism within the program and resisted attempts to define it by the “Yale School” of deconstruction.

== Scholarship ==
=== Early scholarship ===
Brooks’s first book, The Novel of Worldliness (1969), which rewrote his dissertation, was well-received, but it was The Melodramatic Imagination (1976) that later became foundational, especially within film studies, where its theorization of melodrama had lasting influence. His widely read book Reading for the Plot (1984) grew directly out of his teaching; it proposed an analysis of narrative inspired by Russian Formalism and French “narratology” but less static, more engaged with the dynamics of reading and the temporal unfolding of narrative meanings.

=== Whitney Humanities Center ===
At the request of Yale President A. Bartlett Giamatti, Brooks became the founding director of the Whitney Humanities Center in 1981. Conceived as a supra-departmental institute devoted to faculty exchange, interdisciplinary fellowship, and public humanities programming, the center emerged during debates over the “culture wars” and the role of theory in the academy. Brooks worked to build faculty participation across departments, secure funding, and establish fellowships, lecture series, and cross-disciplinary courses.

Brooks served additional terms in leadership roles at Yale, including Director of the Division of the Humanities and chair of Comparative Literature. He was for several years a Contributing Editor of Partisan Review.

=== Law and Literature ===
A major shift in Brooks’s work began through collaboration with Yale Law School professor Paul Gewirtz. Together they developed a course and a landmark edited volume, Law’s Stories: Narrative and Rhetoric in the Law (1996), examining the narrative structures and rhetorical practices of legal decision-making. The project led Brooks to sustained work on confession, agency, and truth-telling in legal and literary contexts, culminating in Troubling Confessions (2000). He later taught at the University of Virginia School of Law and continued to integrate legal analysis with narrative theory. In 2008 he was awarded the Andrew W. Mellon Foundation’s Distinguished Achievement Award.

=== Later Work ===
After leaving the Whitney directorship, Brooks pursued new directions in his work. With Realist Vision (2005) he addressed both literature and painting, and in Henry James Goes to Paris (2007), he sought to merge narrative analysis with biographical and historical storytelling. He was named Sterling Professor of Comparative Literature at Yale in 2006. From 2009 he held a lectureship at Princeton University, divided between the Department of Comparative Literature and the University Center for Human Values. Supported by the Mellon Foundation award, he created the program “The Ethics of Reading and the Cultures of Professionalism,” inspired by his critique of the post-9/11 “Torture Memos” and the ethical dimensions of interpretive practice across professions.

His Princeton seminars explored reading as an ethical act, especially within law, and drew scholars, students, and community participants. Brooks also developed a popular undergraduate course, “Clues, Evidence, Detection: Law Stories,” and extended his teaching into New Jersey prisons through the Princeton Prison Teaching Initiative, an experience he described as profoundly affecting and central to his understanding of unfreedom, narrative, and justice.

In his most recent work, he has returned to favorite authors such as Balzac, Flaubert, and Henry James, and issues of narrative in social and political context. His Seduced by Story: The Use and Abuse of Narrative (2022) was a finalist for the National Book Critics Circle Award. He has also over the years written reviews and essays for New York Review of Books, TLS, Partisan Review, New York Times Book Review and The New Republic.

== Themes ==
Across his career, Brooks has been associated with a wide range of thematic and methodological concerns, including narrative theory, the psychology of reading, and the cultural work of melodrama.

His scholarship has drawn extensively on psychoanalytic approaches to literature while also helping to shape the interdisciplinary field of law and literature, particularly through his analyses of narrative reasoning in legal discourse.

Brooks has additionally contributed to institutional and pedagogical reform in the humanities, advocating for forms of literary study that foreground interpretive rigor and theoretical awareness. Throughout his work, he has framed literary criticism as an extension of classroom praxis and as a fundamentally humanistic inquiry into language, storytelling, and the structures through which meaning is made.

== Personal life ==
Brooks has five children. On July 18, 1959, Brooks married Margaret Elisabeth Waters. On May 12, 2001, Brooks married the law professor, author and commentator, Rosa Brooks. The couple later divorced.

== Bibliography ==
=== Books ===
Non-fiction

- The Novel of Worldliness: Crébillon, Marivaux, Laclos, Stendhal (1969)
- The Melodramatic Imagination: Balzac, Henry James, Melodrama, and the Mode of Excess (1976), ISBN 0-300-06553-1
- Reading for the Plot: Design and Intention in Narrative (1984), ISBN 0-674-74892-1
- Body Work: Objects of Desire in Modern Narrative (1993), ISBN 0-674-07725-3
- Psychoanalysis and Storytelling (1994), ISBN 0-631-19008-2
- Law's Stories: Narrative and Rhetoric in the Law (co-editor with Paul Gewirtz, 1996), ISBN 0-300-07490-5
- Troubling Confessions: Speaking Guilt in Law and Literature (2000), ISBN 0-226-07585-0
- Whose Freud? The Place of Psychoanalysis in Contemporary Culture (co-editor with Alex Woloch) (2000), ISBN 0-300-08116-2
- Realist Vision (2005), ISBN 0-300-10680-7
- Henry James Goes to Paris (2007), ISBN 0-691-12954-1
- Enigmas of Identity (2011), ISBN 978-0-691-15158-8
- Anthologie du mélodrame classique (with Myriam Faten Sfar, 2011), ISBN 978-2-8124-0328-6
- Flaubert in the Ruins of Paris: The Story of a Friendship, a Novel, and a Terrible Year (2017), ISBN 9780465096022
- Balzac's Lives (2020), ISBN 978-1-68137-449-9
- Seduced by Story (2022), ISBN 978-1-68137-663-9
- Henry James Comes Home: Rediscovering America in the Gilded Age (2025), ISBN 9781681379210

Fiction

- World Elsewhere (2000), ISBN 0-684-85333-7
- The Emperor's Body (2010), ISBN 0-393-07958-9

=== Papers ===
- Brooks, Peter (1972), "Romania and the Widening Gyre", PMLA, 87 (1): 7–11, doi:10.2307/460779, JSTOR 460779, S2CID 251027567
- Brooks, Peter (1973), "Virtue and Terror: The Monk", ELH, 40 (2): 249–263, doi:10.2307/2872659, JSTOR 2872659
- Brooks, Peter (1973), "Man and His Fictions: One Approach to the Teaching of Literature", College English, 35 (1): 40–49, doi:10.2307/375195, JSTOR 375195
- "Structuralist Poetics. Structuralism, Linguistics, and the Study of Literature by Jonathan Culler", Diacritics, 6 (1): 23–26, 1976, doi:10.2307/465029, ISSN 0300-7162, JSTOR 465029
- Brooks, Peter (1977), "Freud's Masterplot", Yale French Studies (55/56): 280–300, doi:10.2307/2930440, JSTOR 2930440
- Brooks, Peter (1978), "Godlike Science/Unhallowed Arts: Language and Monstrosity in Frankenstein", New Literary History, 9 (3): 591–605, doi:10.2307/468457, JSTOR 468457
- Brooks, Peter (1979), "Fictions of the Wolfman: Freud and Narrative Understanding", Diacritics, 9 (1): 71–81, doi:10.2307/464701, JSTOR 464701
- Brooks, Peter (1980), "Repetition, Repression, and Return: Great Expectations and the Study of Plot", New Literary History, 11 (3): 503–526, doi:10.2307/468941, JSTOR 468941
- Brooks, Peter (1982), "The Novel and the Guillotine; Or, Fathers and Sons in Le Rouge et le noir", PMLA, 97 (3): 348–362, doi:10.2307/462227, JSTOR 462227, S2CID 163976852
- Brooks, Peter (1982), "Narrative Transaction and Transference (Unburying "Le Colonel Chabert")", Novel: A Forum on Fiction, 15 (2): 101–110, doi:10.2307/1345218, JSTOR 1345218
- Brooks, Peter (1982), "Incredulous Narration: Absalom, Absalom!", Comparative Literature, 34 (3): 247–268, doi:10.2307/1770556, JSTOR 1770556
- Brooks, Peter (1987), "The Idea of a Psychoanalytic Literary Criticism", Critical Inquiry, 13 (2): 334–348, doi:10.1086/448394, JSTOR 1343497, S2CID 162403206
- Brooks, Peter (1989), "Storied Bodies, or Nana at Last Unveil'd", Critical Inquiry, 16 (1): 1–32, doi:10.1086/448524, JSTOR 1343624, S2CID 161653973
- Brooks, Peter (1994), "Aesthetics and Ideology: What Happened to Poetics?", Critical Inquiry, 20 (3): 509–523, doi:10.1086/448723, JSTOR 1343867, S2CID 170321271
- Brooks, Peter (2000), "A Beginning in the Humanities", PMLA, 115 (7), PMLA, Vol. 115, No. 7: 1955–1957, doi:10.2307/463614, JSTOR 463614, S2CID 163549351
