= The Rise of Modern Judicial Review =

1986 book by Christopher Wolfe

The Rise of Modern Judicial Review: From Judicial Interpretation to Judge-Made Law
- Author: Christopher Wolfe
- Language: English
- Subject: American judicial review
- Publisher: Basic Books (1986), Rowman & Littlefield (1994)
- Publication date: 1986, 1994 (revised)
- Media type: Print
- ISBN: 9780822630265

The Rise of Modern Judicial Review: From Judicial Interpretation to Judge-Made Law is a 1986 book by Christopher Wolfe in which the author provides a critique of American judicial review.

== Reception ==
The book was reviewed by Kermit L. Hall, Ward A. Greenberg and Thomas H. Eliot. Judge Robert Bork, in a Wall Street Journal contribution on Jan 16, 2006, listed the book as one of the five best books on the Constitution.
