= Frank Michelman =

American legal scholar (born 1936)

Frank I. Michelman
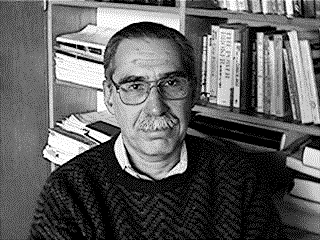
- Born: May 26, 1936 (age 90)
- Education: Yale University (BA); Harvard University (LLB)
- Occupation: Robert Walmsley University Professor Emeritus
- Employer: Harvard Law School
- Awards: American Philosophical Society's Henry M. Phillips Prize in Jurisprudence (2005)

Frank Isaac Michelman (born May 26, 1936) is an American legal scholar and the Robert Walmsley University Professor Emeritus at Harvard Law School.

== Education and career ==
In 1960, Michelman graduated from Harvard Law School. He clerked for Justice William Brennan of the U.S. Supreme Court during the 1961 Term. In 1962, he joined the Harvard Law School faculty.

== Scholarship ==
Michelman wrote the influential law review article, "Property, Utility and Fairness", (80 Harv. L. Rev. 1165 (1967)) on the economic reasons for just compensation in the 5th Amendment Takings Clause in the United States Constitution. This article was cited by the majority in its opinion in Penn Central v. New York City, the Supreme Court case that dealt with the authority of a local New York City landmark law that forbade the railroad company from putting up a skyscraper above the historic Grand Central Terminal structure. Michelman's analysis relied on evaluating whether the nuisance costs and value to society were worth it. He observed that while the courts did not always provide rulings which were fair or provided utility, they provided as perfect a result that can be obtained by the courts. He observed that administrative agencies and legislatures were shirking their roles in the compensation process.

He retired from the university professorship in 2012, and in February 2013 Cass Sunstein was appointed by Harvard University's president, Drew Gilpin Faust, to succeed him.

== Honors and awards ==
Michelman served as vice-president of the American Society for Political and Legal Philosophy 1994–1996 and as its president, 1998–2001.

Michelman was the first recipient of the College of William and Mary's Brigham–Kanner Property Rights Prize in 2004. The Prize is awarded annually to an individual whose work contributes to furthering the cause of private property rights. He was selected for the award largely due to his article, "Property, Utility, and Fairness: Comments on the Ethical Foundations of 'Just Compensation' Law", 80 Har.L. Rev. 1165 (1967).

In 2005 he won the American Philosophical Society's Henry M. Phillips Prize, which he was awarded at a November ceremony in Philadelphia. As of 2022, the prize has been given only twenty-six times since it was established in 1888, and honored Michelman's significant contributions to the field of jurisprudence.

In October 2007, Frank Michelman was a Distinguished Visitor at the American Academy in Berlin, Germany.

== Publications ==
- Michelman, Frank I. "Unenumerated Rights Under Popular Constitutionalism," 9 University of Pennsylvania Journal of Constitutional Law 121 (2006).
- Michelman, Frank I. "Reflection," 82 Texas Law Review 1737 (2004).
- Michelman, Frank I. "The Constitution, Social Rights, and Liberal Political Justification," 1 International Journal of Constitutional Law 13 (2003).
- Michelman, Frank I. "The Bill of Rights, The Common Law, and The Freedom-Friendly State," 58 Miami Law Review 401 (2003).
- Michelman, Frank I. "The Problem of Constitutional Interpretive Disagreement: Can Discourses of Application Help?" in Habermas and Pragmatism (M. Aboulafia, M. Bookman & C. Kemps eds., 2002). (This paper has been republished in Chinese, in the "Practical Philosophy Series," volume Civic Republicanism)
- Michelman, Frank I. "Morality, Identity, and 'Constitutional Patriotism'," 76 Denver University Law Review 1009 (1999).
- Michelman, Frank I. Brennan and Democracy (Princeton University Press 1999).
- Michelman, Frank I. "The Subject of Liberalism," 46 Stanford Law Review 1807 (1994) (reviewing John Rawls, Columbia Univ. Press, Political Liberalism (1996)).
- Michelman, Frank I. "Takings, 1987," 88 Columbia Law Review 1600 (1988).
- Michelman, Frank I. "Ethics, Economics, and the Law of Property" in Ethics, Economics, and the Law (NOMOS series - 24) (J. Roland Pennock & John W. Chapman eds., New York University Press, 1982).
- Michelman, Frank I. "Property, Utility and Fairness: Comments on the Ethical Foundations of 'Just Compensation' Law" Vol. (80)6, April, Harvard Law Review, pp. 1165–1258

== See also ==
- Brigham–Kanner Property Rights Conference
- List of law clerks for the third seat of the Supreme Court of the United States
