= Julian Gewirtz =

American diplomat, historian and poet

Julian Baird Gewirtz
- Born: 1989 or 1990 (age 35–36)
- Education: Oxford University (PhD), Harvard College (BA)
- Occupations: Historian, diplomat, poet
- Parents: Paul Gewirtz (father); Zoë Baird (mother)
- Website: http://www.juliangewirtz.com

Julian Baird Gewirtz (born 1989 or 1990) is an American diplomat, historian, and poet who served as Senior Director for China and Taiwan Affairs at the White House National Security Council in the Biden administration. He was previously Deputy Coordinator for Global China Affairs at the U.S. Department of State and Director for China at the White House National Security Council (NSC).

== Education ==
Gerwirtz attended Hopkins School in New Haven, Connecticut, and later earned a PhD in modern Chinese history from Oxford University as a Rhodes Scholar in 2018 and a BA from Harvard College in 2013.

== Career ==
Prior to joining the NSC, Gewirtz was a Senior Fellow for China Studies at the Council on Foreign Relations. He was a Wilson China Fellow at the Woodrow Wilson International Center in 2020.

== Publications ==
=== Books ===
- Never Turn Back: China and the Forbidden History of the 1980s, Harvard University Press, 2022
- Unlikely Partners: Chinese Reformers, Western Economists, and the Making of Global China, Harvard University Press, 2017

=== Articles ===
- China's Road Not Taken, Foreign Affairs, September 29, 2022
- China Thinks America Is Losing: Washington Must Show Beijing It's Wrong, Foreign Affairs, November/December 2020
- The Chinese Reassessment of Interdependence, China Leadership Monitor, July 1, 2020
- Stop writing China off as an enemy. Millennials don't. The Washington Post, 2017
- The Cruise that Changed China, Foreign Affairs, November/December 2016

=== Poems ===
- Your Face My Flag: Poems, Copper Canyon Press, 2022

== Personal life ==
Gewirtz's father is Yale Law School professor Paul Gewirtz and his mother is Zoë Baird.
