= Zoë Baird =

American lawyer

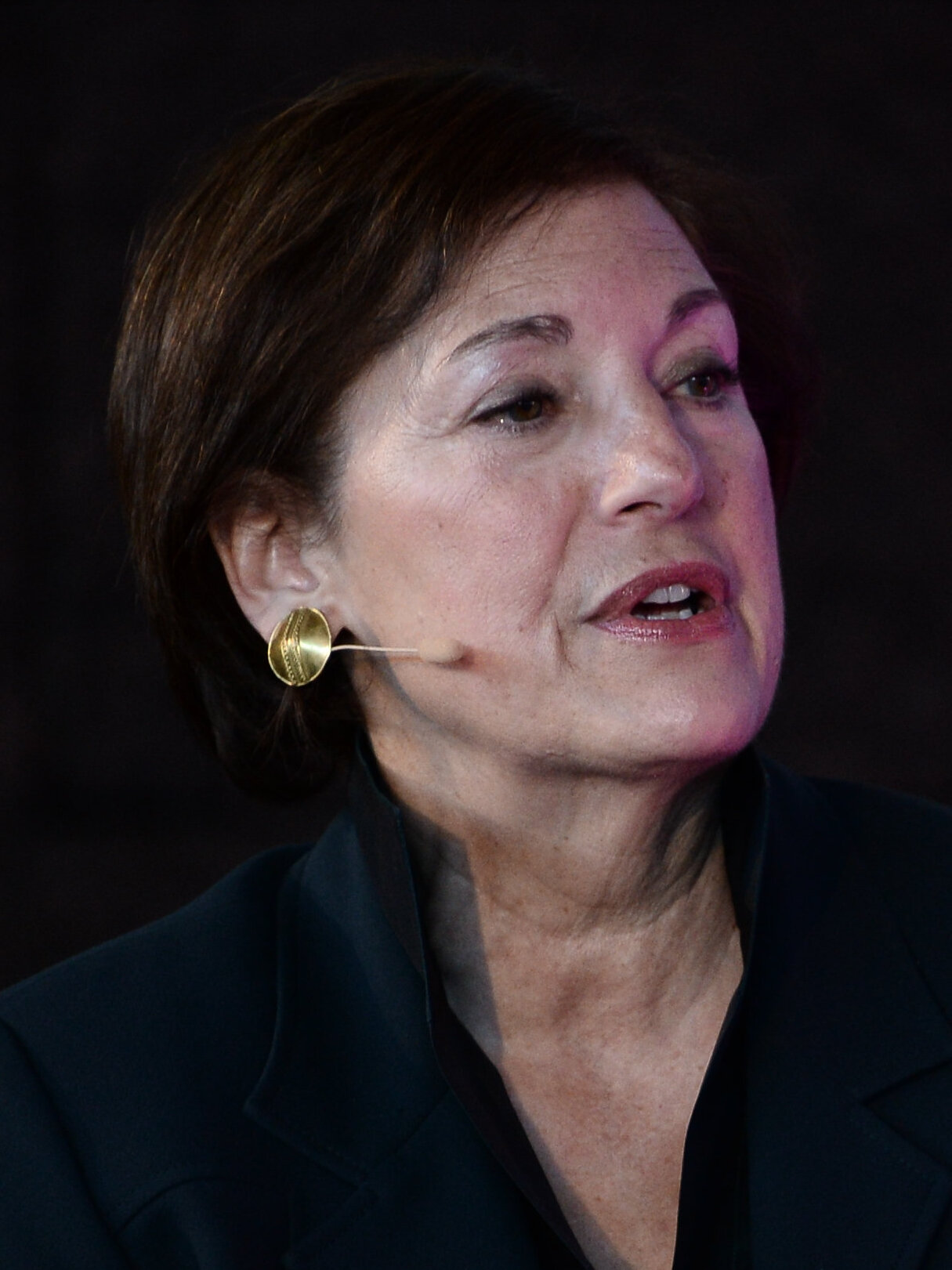
- Baird in 2017
- Born: June 20, 1952 (age 74); New York City, New York, U.S.
- Education: Shoreline Community College (attended); University of California, Berkeley (BA, JD)
- Political party: Democratic
- Spouse(s): Paul Gewirtz (m. 1986; div. 2008) William Budinger (m. 2010)
- Children: Julian

Zoë Eliot Baird (born June 20, 1952) is an American lawyer and executive. She was CEO and President of the Markle Foundation from 1998 to 2022. She later served as Senior Counselor for Technology and Economic Growth to U.S. Secretary of Commerce Gina Raimondo. In 1993, she was President Bill Clinton's initial nominee to serve as United States attorney general. If confirmed, she would have been the first woman to serve in the role, but she withdrew her nomination when it was discovered she had hired illegal immigrants and failed to pay Social Security taxes for them.

== Early life and education ==
Baird was born in Brooklyn on June 20, 1952. She grew up in the Seattle metropolitan area, where she attended Shoreline Community College. She earned an A.B. with a joint degree in political science and communications and public policy, Phi Beta Kappa, in 1974 from the University of California, Berkeley, where she was a member of the Order of the Golden Bear. She earned a J.D. in 1977 from the Boalt Hall School of Law at UC Berkeley.

== Career ==
Baird clerked for U.S. District Judge Albert C. Wollenberg from 1977 to 1978 and worked as Attorney-Advisor at the Office of Legal Counsel at the U.S. Department of Justice from 1979 to 1980. She was Associate Counsel to President of the United States Jimmy Carter from 1980 to 1981.

Baird was a partner at the law firm O'Melveny & Myers, in Washington, DC, from 1981 to 1986. She was counselor and staff executive at General Electric from 1986 to 1990. Baird was senior vice president and general counsel of Aetna from 1990 to 1996. In 1997, she served as senior research associate and senior visiting scholar at Yale Law School where she worked on the growth of terrorism.

Baird was Clinton's first unsuccessful nominee for United States attorney general in 1993. She withdrew her name from consideration when it was learned that she had informed Clinton that she and her husband had hired undocumented immigrants to serve as her chauffeur and nanny and also not paid their Social Security taxes. Her husband had filed sponsorship papers at the time and sought the advice of counsel on paying taxes. She paid $2900 in fines for the infractions. The matter, dubbed "Nannygate", attracted intense public attention, and the question "Do you have a Zoë Baird problem?" became frequently asked of other political appointees, including subsequent candidates for attorney general.

Clinton subsequently appointed Baird to the President's Foreign Intelligence Advisory Board (PFIAB) (1994–2000), the Commission on Roles and Capabilities of the U.S. Intelligence Community (1995) and the G-8 Digital Opportunity Task (DOT) Force (2000–02). In 1997, Baird served on the Department of Defense, Defense Science Board, Summer Study on Terrorism and Weapons of Mass Destruction, as well as the New York Panel for the President's Commission on White House Fellowships. Secretary of Defense Donald Rumsfeld appointed Baird to the Department of Defense Technology and Privacy Advisory Committee (TAPAC) (2003–04). Baird was also a member of the National Security Agency Advisory Board Cyber Awareness and Response Panel (2010–11).

Baird became president of the Markle Foundation since 1998. She served on the G-8 heads of state DOT Force, which created a roadmap for developing countries' adoption of information technology, investments of development assistance, and resources to help avoid a digital divide and to get information technology into the hands of citizens in developing countries. Baird was also a member of the Global Digital Opportunity Initiative that supported the DOT Force.

Under Baird's leadership in the early 2000s, Markle focused on increasing nonprofit and developing country participation in the Internet Corporation for Assigned Names and Numbers (ICANN), the Internet's first official governance body, and on making that body more accountable to all Internet users.

In 2006, Markle released the Markle Connecting for Health Common Framework for Private and Secure Health Information Exchange.

Baird and former Netscape CEO Jim Barksdale served as co-chairs of the Markle Task Force on National Security in the Information Age. Task Force recommendations informed the 9/11 Commission Report and were enacted by executive order and legislation, including the Intelligence Reform and Terrorism Prevention Act of 2004 and the Protect America Act of 2007.

Along with Starbucks chairman, president and chief executive officer Howard Schultz, Baird served as the co-chair for the Markle Initiative for America's Economic Future in a Networked World. She served on the boards of numerous organizations, including the Chubb Corporation and Boston Properties. She founded Lawyers for Children America, which represents abused and neglected children. She is a member of the Aspen Institute Homeland Security Group and the Aspen Institute Strategy Group, an Advisory Board Member for the Lloyd N. Cutler Center for the Rule of Law at the Salzburg Global Seminar, Honorary Trustee of the Brookings Institution and a member of its nominating committee, and Member of the Council on Foreign Relations. and served on its Board of Trustees, and the New York City Ballet Board of Directors and its Treasurer.

In 2022, Baird was named as a senior counselor to Gina Raimondo, who served as United States Secretary of Commerce during the presidency of Joe Biden.

== Personal life ==
Baird was married to Yale Law School professor Paul Gewirtz from 1986 to 2008, and the couple had two sons, Julian Baird Gewirtz and Alec Baird Gewirtz. Baird married William Budinger in 2010.

== See also ==
- Kimba Wood, Bill Clinton's second failed nominee for Attorney General
- Janet Reno, the third—successful—nominee, and United States attorney general from 1993 until 2001
- Unsuccessful nominations to the Cabinet of the United States
