= Paul Gewirtz =

American lawyer (born 1947)

- Born: May 12, 1947 (age 79)
- Education: Columbia University (BA); Yale University (JD)
- Scientific career
- Fields: Law, U.S. foreign policy, China
- Workplaces: Yale Law School

Paul D. Gewirtz (born May 12, 1947) is an American lawyer currently serving as the Potter Stewart Professor of Constitutional Law at Yale Law School and director of the Yale Paul Tsai China Center.

== Education ==
Gewirtz received his Bachelor of Arts degree summa cum laude from Columbia University in 1967 and his Juris Doctor degree from Yale Law School in 1970.

== Career ==
After graduation, he worked as a law clerk for the U.S. District Judge Marvin E. Frankel from 1970 to 1971, and as a law clerk for United States Supreme Court Justice Thurgood Marshall from 1971 to 1972. He was admitted to the bar in Washington, D.C., and was a lawyer at Wilmer Cutler & Pickering and then the Center for Law and Social Policy in Washington, D.C. He joined the faculty at Yale Law School in 1976. In 1994 he was appointed the Potter Stewart Professor of Constitutional Law. He teaches and writes in various legal and policy fields, including constitutional law, U.S. foreign policy and law, U.S.-China relations, antidiscrimination law, federal courts, Chinese law, and law and literature.

Gewirtz played various roles in the administration of President Bill Clinton. He served as the U.S. representative at the European Commission for Democracy through Law of the Council of Europe from 1996 to 2000, and was a consultant to the Solicitor General of the United States in 1997. From 1997-1998, he was on leave of absence from Yale University to serve in President Clinton's administration as Special Representative for the Presidential Rule of Law Initiative. In that post, he developed and led the U.S.-China initiative to cooperate in the legal field that President Clinton and China's President Jiang Zemin agreed to at their 1997 and 1998 Summit meetings.

In 1996 Gewirtz was the founder of Yale Law School's Global Constitutionalism Seminar, which brings Supreme Court judges from around the world to Yale each year, and he served as its Director until 2006. After returning to Yale from the Clinton Administration, Gewirtz founded Yale Law School's China Center in 1999, originally named The China Law Center and renamed the Paul Tsai China Center in 2014, and has been its Director since its founding. The Paul Tsai China Center does research and teaching, and also undertakes projects with Chinese counterparts to seek to advance China's legal reforms and contribute to the development of U.S.–China relations. In 2015 Gewirtz was named to Foreign Policy magazine's Pacific Power Index, a list of "50 people shaping the future of the U.S.-China relationship."

== Personal life ==
He was married to Zoë Baird from 1986 to 2008, and he has two sons, Alec and Julian, who was China Director at the National Security Council and was the Deputy Coordinator for the State Department's Office of China Coordination in the Biden administration.

== Selected publications ==
=== Reports ===
- China, the United States, and the future of a rules-based international order, Brookings Institution, July 22, 2024

=== Articles ===
- "Remedies and Resistance", Yale Law Journal Vol.92, No.4, March 1983, http://digitalcommons.law.yale.edu/fss_papers/1725/.
- "Choice in the Transition: School Desegregation and the Corrective Ideal", Columbia Law Review, Vol.86, No.4, May 1986, pp. 728–798, http://digitalcommons.law.yale.edu/fss_papers/1724/.
- "Aeschylus' Law", Harvard Law Review, Vol.101, No.5, March 1988, http://digitalcommons.law.yale.edu/cgi/viewcontent.cgi?article=2710&context=fss_papers.
- Law's Stories: Narrative and Rhetoric in the Law, co-editor with Peter Brooks, Yale University Press, 1996 (ISBN 0-300-07490-5 ).
- "On 'I know it when I see it'", Yale Law Journal Vol.105, pp1023–1047 (1996), http://digitalcommons.law.yale.edu/fss_papers/1706/.
- "Constitutional Law and New Technology," Social Policy, 1997, https://philpapers.org/rec/GEWCLA.
- "Privacy and Speech", 2001 Supreme Court Review, https://www.law.yale.edu/system/files/documents/pdf/CL-P.Gewirtz.Privacy_and_Speech.pdf
- Karl Llewellyn, The Case Law System in America, Edited and with an Introduction, University of Chicago Press, 1989 (ISBN 0-226-48790-3).
- "A Lawyer's Death", Harvard Law Review, Vol.100, pp2053–2056, http://digitalcommons.law.yale.edu/cgi/viewcontent.cgi?article=2711&context=fss_papers
- "Thurgood Marshall", Yale Law Journal Vol.101, pp13–18 (1991) http://digitalcommons.law.yale.edu/fss_papers/1708/.
- "The Pragmatic Passion of Stephen Breyer," Yale Law Journal Vol. 115, pp1675–1698 (2006), http://www.yalelawjournal.org/review/the-pragmatic-passion-of-stephen-breyer.
- "The U.S.-China Rule of Law Initiative", 11 Wm. & Mary Bill Rts. J. 603 (2003), http://scholarship.law.wm.edu/wmborj/vol11/iss2/5.
- "Xi, Mao, and China's Search for a Usable Past," ChinaFile, January 14, 2014, https://www.chinafile.com/reporting-opinion/viewpoint/xi-mao-and-chinas-search-usable-past.
- "Limits of Law in the South China Sea," Brookings Institution, May 2016, http://www.brookings.edu/research/papers/2016/05/06-limits-of-law-south-china-sea-gewirtz.
- "Can the U.S.-China Crisis Be Stabilized?," Brookings Institution, June 2019, https://www.brookings.edu/blog/order-from-chaos/2019/06/26/can-the-u-s-china-crisis-be-stabilized.
- "No One Knows: How the Unknowable Consequences of COVID-19 Affect Thinking About Foreign Policy and U.S.-China Relations," Brookings Institution, June 2020, https://www.brookings.edu/opinions/no-one-knows-how-the-unknowable-consequences-of-covid-19-affect-thinking-about-foreign-policy-and-u-s-china-relations.
- "The Future of Trans-Atlantic Collaboration on China: What the EU-China Summit Showed," Brookings Institution, June 2020, https://www.brookings.edu/blog/order-from-chaos/2020/06/26/the-future-of-trans-atlantic-collaboration-on-china-what-the-eu-china-summit-showed.
- "Working With Our (European) Allies," November 2020, https://www.brookings.edu/wp-content/uploads/2020/11/Paul-Gewirtz.pdf, in The Future of US Policy Towards China, 2020, https://www.brookings.edu/multi-chapter-report/the-future-of-us-policy-toward-china and https://law.yale.edu/china-center/resources/us-china-relations.
- "A Roadmap for U.S.-Europe Cooperation on China," February 2021, https://law.yale.edu/sites/default/files/area/center/china/document/roadmap_for_us-eu_cooperation_on_china.pdf
- "Words and Policies: 'De-risking' and China Policy," Brookings Institution, May 2023, https://www.brookings.edu/articles/words-and-policies-de-risking-and-china-policy.

== See also ==
- List of law clerks for the tenth seat of the Supreme Court of the United States
