= Carol M. Rose =

Carol M. Rose is the Ashby Lohse Chair in Water and Natural Resources at the University of Arizona James E. Rogers College of Law and was previously the Gordon Bradford Tweedy Professor of Law and Organization at Yale Law School.

Rose graduated from Antioch College with a B.A. (1962) and received an M.A. from the University of Chicago (1963), a Ph.D. in History from Cornell University (1969) and a J.D. from the University of Chicago Law School (1977).

In 2010, Rose was awarded the Brigham–Kanner Property Rights Prize, awarded by the College of William & Mary School of Law annually to an individual whose work has advanced the cause of private property rights. Rose's notable works include Perspectives on Property Law (Aspen 3d ed. 2014) (with Robert Ellickson and Henry E. Smith) and Property and Persuasion: Essays on the History, Theory, and Rhetoric of Ownership (Westview Press 1994).
