= Morton Horwitz =

American legal historian and law professor

Morton J. Horwitz (born 1938) is an American legal historian and law professor at Harvard Law School.

== Career ==
Horwitz obtained an A.B. from the City College of New York (1959), an A.M. and Ph.D. from Harvard University (1962 and 1964), and an LL.B. from Harvard Law School (1967).

He became an associate professor of law at Harvard Law School in 1970 and gained tenure as a full professor in 1974. In 1981, he was appointed the Charles Warren Professor of American Legal History.

== Transformation work ==
His first book, The Transformation of American Law, 1780-1860, was published in 1977, and is widely regarded as one of the most important books in modern American legal historiography. It won the Bancroft Prize, the preeminent prize in American history in the United States. A product of its time, this book sought to give a "thick description" (à la Clifford Geertz) of the transformation of American law in the period, without appealing to "covering laws" (à la Carl Gustav Hempel). The book was conceived as an attack on the so-called "Consensus School" of American Legal History, which had dominated the field of Legal History in the 1950s and minimized the role of class dimensions in American legal history. The main argument of his book is that in the first half of the 19th century, many judges self-consciously allied themselves with a rapidly growing class of mercantile capitalists and promoted a series of legal rules which favored those capitalists.

In The Transformation of American Law, 1870-1960: The Crisis of Legal Orthodoxy (1992), the sequel to his first book, Horwitz focused on the critics of the system which he described in his first book, especially Oliver Wendell Holmes, Roscoe Pound, and Karl Llewellyn. He frames this change in the law as a debate between "Legal Formalists" and "Legal Realists". He argues that in this period, the victors from his first book tried to present the current state of the law as the natural and necessary consequence of the application of the rules of reason. In their critique of Legal Formalism, the Legal Realists argued that the inductive and analogical model applied by the Legal Formalists was logically incoherent; that all law was ultimately a power relationship; and that, therefore, law was basically a form of public policy which should be decided on public policy grounds rather than by recourse to abstract categories like "reason".

In 1998, Horwitz published his third book, an encomium on the Warren Court entitled The Warren Court and the Pursuit of Justice.

== See also ==
- Legal realism
