= Michael M. Berger =

American lawyer

Michael M. Berger is an eminent domain and land use lawyer at the firm of Manatt, Phelps & Phillips. His practice focuses on eminent domain, inverse condemnation, due process, and equal protection. Berger received his undergraduate degree at Brandeis University. He received his J.D. from Washington University School of Law at Washington University in St. Louis and his LL.M. in real property from the University of Southern California. He has argued before the Supreme Court as well as state Supreme Courts and Federal Appellate Courts. Notable cases he has argued before the US Supreme Court include Tahoe-Sierra Preservation Council, Inc. v. Tahoe Regional Planning Agency, City of Monterey v. Del Monte Dunes at Monterey, Ltd., Preseault v. United States, and First English Evangelical Lutheran Church v. Los Angeles County.

Berger is a frequent author in scholarly journals, dealing with the subjects of his practice, and a frequent lecturer before professional groups. In 1989, He was the recipient of the Harrison Tweed prize awarded by the American Law Institute/American Bar Association for his outstanding contribution to continuing legal education.

In 2014, Berger was awarded the Brigham–Kanner Property Rights Prize by William & Mary Law School for his steadfast defense of private property rights in the courts and his contributions to takings jurisprudence. He is the first practicing lawyer to receive the honor.
