= Steven J. Eagle =

American legal scholar

Steven J. Eagle is Professor of Law Emeritus at George Mason University's Antonin Scalia Law School, where he teaches Constitutional Law, Land Use Planning, and Property amongst other subjects, and was formerly a professor of law at George Washington University Law School, Vanderbilt University, the University of Toledo College of Law, and Pace University Law School. Eagle graduated from the City College of New York with a B.A. (1965) and received a J.D. from the Yale Law School (1970).

Eagle's notable works include Regulatory Takings, the leading treatise on the subject, and "The Four-Factor Penn Central Regulatory Takings Test," which was cited by the Supreme Court of the United States in Murr v. Wisconsin. Eagle is a prolific writer and speaker who has also testified before Congress on several occasions. In 2019, Eagle was awarded the Brigham–Kanner Property Rights Prize, an award hosted at the Marshall-Wythe School of Law at the College of William & Mary given annually to an individual whose work has advanced the cause of private property rights.
