= David L. Callies =

David Lee Callies (born April 21, 1943) is the Benjamin A. Kudo Professor of Law at the William S. Richardson School of Law at the University of Hawaiʻi at Mānoa. His focus is on the topics of land use, real property, and state and local government. In 2015 he was honored with the Owners' Counsel of America's Crystal Eagle Award for his lifetime of scholarship about land use, eminent domain, and regulatory takings.

== Education and career ==
Callies earned his B.A. at DePauw University. He obtained his J.D. degree at the University of Michigan Law School and his LL.M. at the University of Nottingham. Prior to becoming faculty at the University of Hawaiʻi, Callies practiced local government and land-use law in Chicago with the firm of Ross & Hardies. He taught as an adjunct professor at the University of Wisconsin–Milwaukee's School of Architecture and Urban Planning. He also served as an Assistant State's Attorney.

== Publications ==
Callies has authored twenty books, including “Cases and Materials on Land Use(with Freilich and Roberts);The Taking Issue (1973); The Role of Customary Law in Sustainable Development (2006); Land Use Controls in the United States; Regulating Paradise: Land Use Controls in Hawaii (1984); Preserving Paradise: Why Regulation Won't Work (1994); Taking Land: Compulsory Purchase and Land Use Regulation in the Asia-Pacific (2002); and Property and the Public Interest (2007). In addition to his books, he has authored more than one-hundred articles and chapters.

== Honors and accolades ==
- Board Member; Institute for Planning, Zoning, & Eminent Domain
- Past Chair; Hawai'i State Bar Association, Real Property and Financial Services Section
- Past Chair; American Bar Association, State and Local Government Law Section
- Lifetime Achievement Award (2006); American Bar Association, State and Local Government Law Section
- Past Chair; American Association of Law Schools, State and Local Government Law Section
- Past Chair; Academics Forum
- Council Member; International Bar Association, Asia Pacific Forum
- Member; American Law Institute (ALI)
- Member; American Institute of Certified Planners (FAICP), College of Fellows
- Member; American College of Real Estate Lawyers (ACREL)
- Co-editor; Land Use and Environmental Law Review
- Board Member; Social Science Association of Honolulu
- Crystal Eagle Award (2015); Owners' Counsel of America
- Brigham–Kanner Property Rights Prize (2017); William & Mary Law School
