= Christopher Wolfe =

American political scientist

- Born: 1949 (age 76–77)
- Spouse: Anne McGowan Wolfe (m. 1972)
- Children: 10

Academic background
- Education: Boston College (PhD), University of Notre Dame (BA)

Academic work
- Discipline: political science
- Sub-discipline: social philosophy
- Institutions: University of Dallas; Marquette University
- Main interests: American judicial review, natural law public philosophy

Christopher Wolfe (born 1949) is an American political scientist and Distinguished Research Scholar and former Affiliate Professor of Politics at the University of Dallas. He is also Emeritus Professor at Marquette University. Wolfe is known for his works on American judicial review and natural law public philosophy.

== Life ==
Wolfe received his BA (summa cum laude) from the University of Notre Dame in 1971. Then he studied political philosophy at Boston College and earned his PhD in 1978. During his doctoral studies, he moved from political philosophy to American political thought and constitutional law. Wolfe taught at Assumption College (1975-1978) and then moved to Marquette University. He was President of the American Public Philosophy Institute (now the Dallas Forum on Law, Politics, and Culture) between 1989 and 2021. Wolfe married Anne McGowan Wolfe in 1972 and they have had ten children.

== Books ==
- Essays on Faith and Liberal Democracy, University Press Of America, 1986
- The Rise of Modern Judicial Review, Basic Books, 1986 (revised edition, Rowman and Littlefield, 1994)
- How to Read the Constitution, Rowman and Littlefield, 1996
- Judicial Activism, Rowman & Littlefield, 1997
- The Family, Civil Society, and the State, (ed.), Rowman and Littlefield, 1998
- Homosexuality and American Public Life (ed.), Spence Publishing, 1999
- Natural Law and Public Reason, edited with Robert George, Georgetown University Press, 2000
- Same-Sex Matters (ed.), Spence Publishing, 2000
- Liberalism at the Crossroads, edited with John Hittinger, Rowman and Littlefield, 2003
- That Eminent Tribunal: Judicial Supremacy and the Constitution (ed.), Princeton University Press, 2004
- Natural Law Liberalism, Cambridge University Press, 2006
- The Naked Public Square Reconsidered (ed.), ISI Books, 2009
- Natural Law Today: The Present State of the Perennial Philosophy, edited with Steven Brust, Lexington Books, 2018
- The Concept of Social Justice (ed.), St. Augustine's Press, 2019
