= Thomas W. Merrill =

American legal scholar

- Education: University of Chicago Law School; University of Oxford; Grinnell College
- Scientific career
- Fields: Constitutional law Property law
- Workplaces: Columbia Law School; Yale Law School

Thomas W. Merrill is an American legal scholar who is the Charles Evans Hughes Professor at Columbia Law School. He has also taught at Yale Law School and Northwestern University School of Law.

== Biography ==
Merrill received a B.A. from Grinnell College in 1971 and a B.A. with first-class honors in philosophy, politics and economics in 1973 from Oxford University, where he was a Rhodes Scholar. He received his JD from the University of Chicago Law School in 1977 and went on to clerk for Judge David L. Bazelon of the D.C. Circuit Court of Appeals, and then United States Supreme Court Justice Harry Blackmun. Before moving to Yale, he was the Charles Keller Beekman Professor of Law at Columbia from 2003 to 2008 and the John Paul Stevens Professor of Law at Northwestern University from 1993 to 2003. He also served as a Deputy Solicitor General from 1987 to 1990. Merrill returned to Columbia in 2010 and teaches Property, Legislation and Regulation, and Torts, among other courses.

Merrill has published in the Columbia Law Review, Harvard Law Review, and the Yale Law Journal. He has co-authored multiple textbooks, generally dealing with the laws of property. In 2013, Merrill was awarded the Brigham–Kanner Property Rights Prize by the College of William and Mary School of Law for his extensive body of work concerning property rights.

== See also ==
- List of law clerks for the second seat of the Supreme Court of the United States
