= Presidential Rule of Law Initiative =

Presidential Rule of Law Initiative, or US-China Rule of Law Initiative, was a project between the United States and People's Republic of China to expand bilateral cooperation in the field of law.

In 1998, U.S. President Bill Clinton and General Secretary of the Chinese Communist Party Jiang Zemin agreed to this program. The special representative for the U.S. side was Paul Gewirtz.

One project of this initiative was the American Law Library program, which was to translate hundreds of books of American law into Chinese.
