= Richard Epstein =

American legal scholar (born 1943)

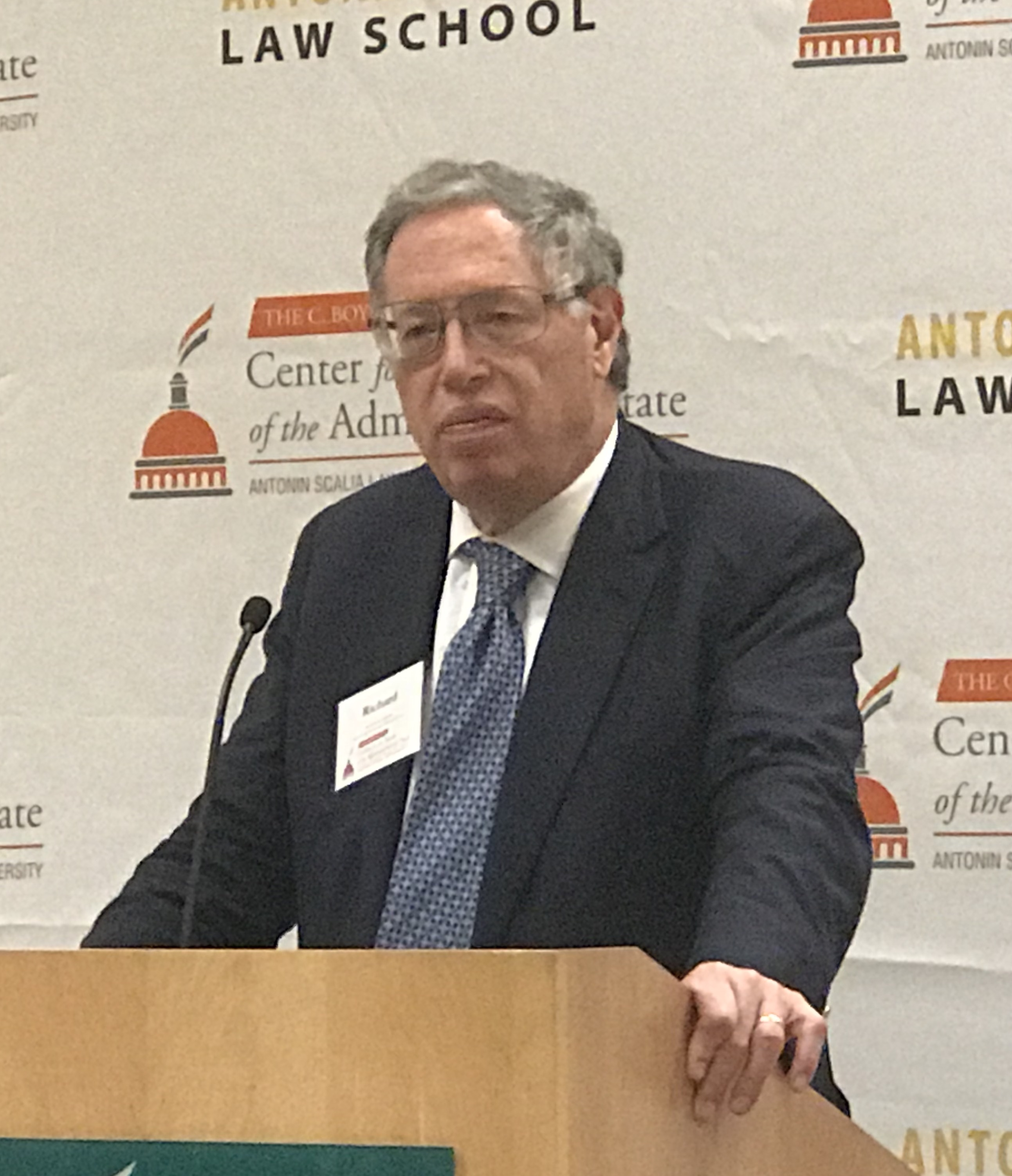
- Epstein in 2018
- Born: April 17, 1943 (age 83); New York City, U.S.
- Spouse: Eileen
- Children: 3
- Relatives: Paul Reiser (cousin)
- Awards: American Academy of Arts and Sciences (1985); Brigham–Kanner Property Rights Prize (2005); Bradley Prize (2011)

Academic background
- Education: Columbia University (BA); Oriel College, Oxford (BA); Yale University (LLB)
- Influences: Friedrich Hayek; H. L. A. Hart

Academic work
- Discipline: Constitutional law Property law
- Institutions: University of Southern California; University of Chicago; MacLean Center for Clinical Medical Ethics; New York University: Stanford University; Hoover Institution
- Main interests: Takings clause, Roman law
- Notable works: Takings: Private Property and the Power of Eminent Domain (1985)
- Influenced: Randy Barnett

Richard Allen Epstein (born April 17, 1943) is an American legal scholar known for his writings on torts, contracts, property rights, law and economics, classical liberalism, and libertarianism. He is the Laurence A. Tisch Professor of Law at New York University and the director of its Classical Liberal Institute. He is also a senior research fellow at the Civitas Institute, the Peter and Kirsten Bedford Senior Fellow at the Hoover Institution, and a senior lecturer and the James Parker Hall Distinguished Service Professor of Law Emeritus at the University of Chicago.

According to James W. Ely Jr., Epstein's writings have had a "pervasive influence on American legal thought." In 2000, a study published in The Journal of Legal Studies identified Epstein as the 12th-most cited legal scholar of the 20th century; in 2008, he was chosen in a poll by Legal Affairs as one of the most influential modern legal thinkers. A study of legal publications between 2009 and 2013 found Epstein to be the third-most frequently cited American legal scholar during that period, behind only Cass Sunstein and Erwin Chemerinsky. In a 2021 examination by Fred R. Shapiro, Epstein was the fifth most-cited legal scholar of all time.

== Early life and education ==
Epstein was born on April 17, 1943, in Brooklyn, New York. His grandparents were Ashkenazi Jews who immigrated to the United States from Russia and Austria in the early 20th century. Epstein's father, Bernard Epstein (1908–1978), was a radiologist, and his mother, Catherine Epstein (née Reiser; 1908–2004), managed his father's medical office. He has two sisters. He attended elementary school at P.S. 161, a school that is now one of the Success Academy Charter Schools. Epstein and his family lived in Brooklyn until 1954, when they moved to Great Neck, Long Island, after his father began working at the Long Island Jewish Medical Center.

Epstein graduated summa cum laude from Columbia University with a Bachelor of Arts in 1964. As an undergraduate, he obtained special permission to pursue a self-selected program of study across sociology, philosophy, and mathematics. After graduation, he received a Kellett Fellowship, which allowed him to study jurisprudence at the University of Oxford for two years. He received a B.A. with first-class honours from Oriel College, Oxford, in 1966 then graduated from Yale Law School with an LL.B., cum laude, in 1968.

== Academic career ==
After graduating from law school, Epstein became an assistant professor at the Gould School of Law of the University of Southern California (USC). He taught at USC for four years before moving to the University of Chicago Law School in 1972. Epstein taught at Chicago for 38 years, eventually holding the title of James Parker Hall Distinguished Service Professor of Law. Epstein formally retired from Chicago in 2010, but quickly came out of retirement to join the faculty of the New York University School of Law as its inaugural Laurence A. Tisch Professor of Law. He remains a professor emeritus and senior lecturer at Chicago, occasionally teaching courses there. In 2013, NYU Law established a new academic research center, the Classical Liberal Institute, and named Epstein its inaugural director.

Since 2001, Epstein has served as the Peter and Kirsten Bedford Senior Fellow at the Hoover Institution, a prominent American public policy think tank at Stanford University. He has served in many academic and public organizations and has received a number of awards. In 1983, he was made a senior fellow at the Center for Clinical Medical Ethics at the University of Chicago Medical School, and, in 1985, he was inducted into the American Academy of Arts and Sciences. He was editor of the Journal of Legal Studies from 1981 to 1991, and of the Journal of Law and Economics from 1991 to 2001. In 2003, Epstein received an honorary LL.D. degree from the University of Ghent, and in 2018 he received an honorary doctorate in law from the University of Siegen. In 2005, the College of William & Mary awarded him the Brigham–Kanner Property Rights Prize for his contributions to the field of property rights. In 2011, he was awarded a Bradley Prize by the Bradley Foundation.

== Writings ==
Epstein became known in the American legal community in 1985 with Harvard University Press's publication of his book Takings: Private Property and the Power of Eminent Domain. In the book, Epstein argued that the "Takings Clause" of the Fifth Amendment to the U.S. Constitution—which reads, "nor shall private property be taken for public use, without just compensation", and is traditionally viewed as a limit on the governmental power of eminent domain—gives constitutional protection to citizens' economic rights, and so requires the government to be regarded the same as any other private entity in a property dispute. The argument was controversial and sparked a great deal of debate on the interpretation of the takings clause after the book's publication. During Clarence Thomas's Supreme Court Justice confirmation hearings in 1991, then-Senator Joe Biden, "in a dramatic movement", held the book up and "repeatedly interrogated" Thomas about his position on the book's thesis. The book served as a focal point in the argument about the government's ability to control private property. It has also influenced how some courts view property rights and been cited by the U.S. Supreme Court four times, including in the 1992 case Lucas v. South Carolina Coastal Council.

At the height of the HIV pandemic in 1988, Epstein argued that companies ought to be able to discriminate against "AIDS carriers" and that anti-discrimination laws were unfair to employers. In place of such laws, Epstein argued that "AIDS carriers" ought to have their health insurance premiums subsidized via taxation so as to "discipline the behavior of government and interests groups, here by requiring citizens to make choices about how much they individually are prepared to pay to subsidize AIDS carriers." Furthermore, he argued that "[t]here is no reason to suppose that any public benefit obtained from having employers and their insurers care for AIDS victims will be at some level that matches the additional costs that are imposed." Instead, Epstein proposed that employers have the right to refuse to hire suspected "AIDS carriers".

Epstein is an advocate of minimal legal regulation. In his 1995 book Simple Rules for a Complex World, he consolidates much of his previous work and argues that simple rules work best because complexities create excessive costs. Complexity comes from attempting to do justice in individual cases. Complex rules are justifiable, however, if they can be opted out of. Drawing on Gary Becker, he argues that the Civil Rights Act and other anti-discrimination legislation ought to be repealed. Consistent with the principles of classical liberalism, he believes that the federal regulation on same-sex marriage, the Defense of Marriage Act, should be repealed, stating:

"Under our law, only the state may issue marriage licenses. That power carries with it a duty to serve all-comers on equal terms, which means that the state should not be able to pick and choose those on whom it bestows its favors. DOMA offends this principle in two ways. First, it excludes polygamous couples from receiving these marital benefits. Second, it excludes gay couples. Both groups contribute to the funds that support these various government programs. Both should share in its benefits."

Epstein has criticized the Supreme Court ruling in Obergefell v. Hodges. In 2007, he defended the intellectual property rights of pharmaceutical companies against the cheaper, generic production of AIDS drugs, writing that "disregarding property rights in the name of human rights reduces human welfare around the globe".

In 2014, Epstein argued against reparations for African Americans in a piece published on the Hoover Institution's website.

Contributing to the anthology Our American Story (2019), Epstein addressed the possibility of a shared American narrative. Taking a decidedly skeptical approach, Epstein concluded that no new national narrative can be achieved "unless we engage in what I call American minimalism—a conscious reduction of the issues that we think are truly best handled as a nation and not better address by smaller subnational groups: states, local governments, and, most importantly, all sorts of small private organizations that are free to choose as they please in setting their own membership and mission."

=== COVID-19 pandemic ===
In March and April 2020, Epstein wrote several essays published by the Hoover Institution giving a contrarian account of the COVID-19 pandemic and warning against extensive containment and mitigative United States responses to the COVID-19 pandemic, which he called an "overreaction". In a piece published on March 16, he argued that the word "pandemic" is not to be used lightly and that the virus should be allowed to run its course, predicting there would be 500 U.S. deaths. In early June, the U.S. death total surpassed 100,000. On March 24, when U.S. deaths had already exceeded 500, Epstein added a "Correction & Addendum", in which he changed his forecast to 5,000 deaths without changing the underlying model that had led him to his first estimate. On April 6, when the death toll had already far surpassed his earlier predictions, he again revised that figure, with the "Correction & Addendum" section declaring under the inaccurate date stamp "March 24, 2020" that the "original erroneous estimate of 5,000 dead in the US [was] a number 10 times smaller than [he had] intended to state", implying that both "500" and "5,000" had been misprints for "50,000". After several news reports about Epstein's ever-increasing estimates, on April 21 an editor's note appeared on the website that explained the latest changes as an "editing error" and clarified that Epstein's original prediction had been 500 deaths. In December 2020, when the death toll from COVID-19 in the U.S. was over 333,000, Politico named Epstein's predictions among "the most audacious, confident and spectacularly incorrect prognostications about the year".

Epstein compared COVID-19 to the 2009 H1N1 pandemic and suggested that public health measures "are done better at the level of plants, hotels, restaurants, and schools than remotely by political leaders." He argued that "the response of the state governors to the coronavirus outbreak has become far more dangerous than the disease itself", writing that the number of deaths had been exaggerated. His essays, containing a number of factual errors and misconceptions about the SARS-CoV-2 virus, circulated in conservative circles and in the Trump administration upon their publication. In an article published on June 6, Epstein praised Republican-governed states like Florida for their crisis management, linking the then greater deaths in Democratic-governed states to their "interventionist policies".

== Influence ==
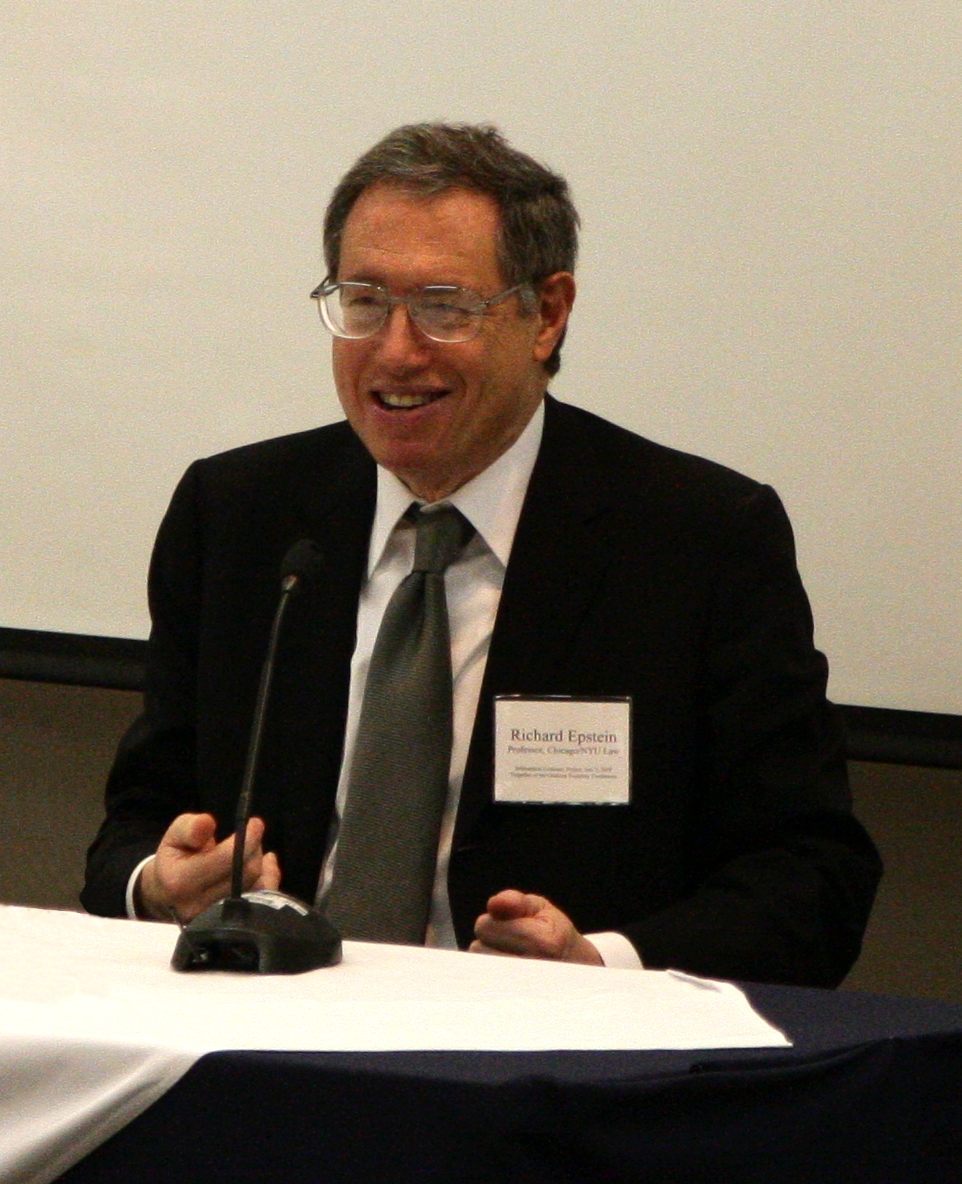
Epstein speaks at a conference in George Mason University (2009)

In 2006, the American scholar James W. Ely Jr. wrote: "It is a widely accepted premise that Professor Richard A. Epstein has exercised a pervasive influence on American legal thought." In 2000, a study published in The Journal of Legal Studies identified Epstein as the 12th-most cited legal scholar of the entire 20th century. In 2008, he was chosen in a poll taken by Legal Affairs as one of the most influential legal thinkers of modern times. A study of legal publications between 2009 and 2013 found Epstein to be the 3rd most frequently cited American legal scholar, behind only Cass Sunstein and Erwin Chemerinsky.

== Politics ==
Epstein has said that when voting, he chooses "anyone but the Big Two" who are "just two members of the same statist party fighting over whose friends will get favors". He has voted Libertarian. Epstein says he is "certainly a Calvin Coolidge fan; he made some mistakes, but he was a small-government guy". Epstein served on The Constitution Project's Guantanamo Task Force.

In early 2015, Epstein commented on his relationship to the modern American political landscape, stating: "I'm in this very strange position: I'm not a conservative when it comes to religious values and so forth, but I do believe, in effect, in a strong foreign policy and a relatively small domestic government, but that's not the same thing as saying I believe in no government at all." He has also been characterized as a libertarian conservative. During a debate with Chris Preble in December 2016, Epstein identified himself as being a "libertarian hawk".

In 2023, Epstein co-authored an op-ed in the Wall Street Journal defending the 2023 Israeli judicial reform. Epstein has defended Israel's policies vis-à-vis Palestinians, calling allegations of apartheid a canard.

In January 2025, Epstein argued the Fourteenth Amendment to the United States Constitution did not guarantee birthright citizenship for all persons born in the United States.

== Personal life ==
Epstein's wife, Eileen W. Epstein, is a fundraiser and educator who serves on the board of trustees for the philanthropic organization American Jewish World Service. They have three children: two sons, Benjamin M. and Elliot, and a daughter, Melissa. Epstein is a first cousin of the comedian and actor Paul Reiser.

Epstein has described himself as "a rather weak, non-practicing Jew."

== Selected works ==
=== Books as editor/co-editor ===
- —; Stone, Geoffrey R.; Sunstein, Cass R. (1992). The Bill of Rights in the Modern State. Chicago: University of Chicago Press. ISBN 978-0226775326.
- —; Sunstein, Cass R. (2001). The Vote: Bush, Gore & the Supreme Court. Chicago: University of Chicago Press. ISBN 978-0226213071.

=== Books as author ===
- Epstein, Richard A. (1985). Takings: Private Property and the Power of Eminent Domain. Cambridge: Harvard University Press. ISBN 0674867297.
- — (1992). Forbidden Grounds: The Case Against Employment Discrimination Laws. Cambridge: Harvard University Press. ISBN 978-0674308084.
- — (1995). Simple Rules for a Complex World. Cambridge: Harvard University Press. ISBN 978-0674808218.
- Epstein, Richard A. (2003). Skepticism and freedom : a modern case for classical liberalism. Chicago: University of Chicago Press. ISBN 0226213048.
- — (2011). Design for Liberty: Private Property, Public Administration, and the Rule of Law. Cambridge: Harvard University Press. ISBN 978-0674061842.
- — (2014). The Classical Liberal Constitution: The Uncertain Quest for Limited Government. Cambridge: Harvard University Press. ISBN 978-0674724891.
- — (2020). The Dubious Morality of Modern Administrative Law. Lanham: Rowman & Littlefield. ISBN 978-1538141496.

=== Articles ===
- Epstein, Richard A. (1973). "A Theory of Strict Liability". Journal of Legal Studies. 2 (1): 151–204. doi:10.1086/467495. S2CID 153758836.
- — (1973). "Substantive Due Process by Any Other Name: The Abortion Cases". Supreme Court Review. 1973: 159–86. JSTOR 3108804.
- — (1975). "Unconscionability: A Critical Reappraisal". Journal of Law and Economics. 18 (2): 293–315. doi:10.1086/466814. S2CID 153434595.
- — (1979). "Nuisance Law: Corrective Justice and Its Utilitarian Constraints". Journal of Legal Studies. 8 (1): 49–102. doi:10.1086/467602. S2CID 153518407.
- — (1982). "The Social Consequences of Common Law Rules". Harvard Law Review. 95 (8): 1717–51. JSTOR 1340646.
- — (1982). "Notice and Freedom of Contract in the Law of Servitudes". Southern California Law Review. 55 (6): 1353–68.
- — (1982). "The Historical Origins and Economic Structure of Workers' Compensation Law". Georgia Law Review. 16 (4): 775–820.
- — (1983). "A Common Law for Labor Relations: A Critique of the New Deal Labor Legislation". Yale Law Journal. 92 (8): 1357–1408. JSTOR 796178.
- — (1984). "Toward a Revitalization of the Contract Clause". University of Chicago Law Review. 51 (3): 703–51. JSTOR 1599484.
- — (1984). "In Defense of the Contract at Will". University of Chicago Law Review. 51 (4): 947–82. JSTOR 1599554.
- — (1987). "The Proper Scope of the Commerce Power". Virginia Law Review. 73 (8): 1387–1455. JSTOR 1073233.
- — (1988). "The Supreme Court, 1987 Term — Foreword: Unconstitutional Conditions, State Power, and the Limits of Consent". Harvard Law Review. 102 (1): 4–104.
- — (1993). "Lucas v. South Carolina Coastal Council: A Tangled Web of Expectations". Stanford Law Review. 45 (5): 1369–92. JSTOR 1229072.
- — (1997). "The Clear View of The Cathedral: The Dominance of Property Rules". Yale Law Journal. 106 (7): 2091–2120. JSTOR 797162.

=== Casebooks ===
- Epstein, Richard A.; Gregory, Charles; Kalven, Harry (1977). Cases and Materials on the Law of Torts (3rd ed.). New York: Little, Brown & Co. 4th edition (1984), New York: Little, Brown & Co.
- —; Sharkey, Catherine M. (2016). Cases and Materials on Torts (11th ed.). New York: Aspen Casebooks. ISBN 978-1454868255.

== See also ==
- Libertarian theories of law
