= Henry B. Hansmann =

- Born: October 5, 1945 (age 81); Highland Park, Illinois, U.S.
- Known for: "The Role of Nonprofit Enterprise"
- Awards: Guggenheim Fellowship

Academic background
- Education: Brown University (BA); Yale University (JD, PhD)

Henry B. Hansmann (born October 5, 1945) is an American scholar of law and economics. He is the Oscar M. Ruebhausen Professor Emeritus of Law at Yale Law School.

Hansmann is noted for his scholarship on the economics of organizational ownership and design and is credited with founding the modern study of nonprofit organizations. He is known for his 1980 article "The Role of Nonprofit Enterprise" which has had a "seminal influence on analyses of the law and economics of the nonprofit sector."

== Early life and education ==
Hansmann was born on October 5, 1945, in Highland Park, Illinois. Hansmann attended Brown University, receiving a B.A in mathematics in 1967. He earned a J.D. and Ph.D. in economics from Yale University in 1974 and 1978.

== Career ==
Hansmann taught at the University of Pennsylvania Law School between 1975 and 1983. Between 1991 and 1992 he was a Visiting Professor of Law at Harvard Law School. Hansman taught at the New York University School of Law in the late 1990s, eventually gaining an appointment as the George T. Lowy Professor of Law in 2003. He became Augustus Lines Professor of Law at Yale Law School in 2004, remaining in that position until 2011. From 2011 until his retirement in 2019, Hansmann was the Oscar M. Ruebhausen Professor of Law at Yale, holding a joint appointment at the Yale School of Management.

In 1985, Hansmann was awarded a Guggenheim Fellowship. In 2004 he served as president of the American Law and Economics Association. He was elected as a fellow of the American Academy of Arts and Sciences in 2007.
