= James W. Ely Jr. =

American legal scholar

- Born: January 20, 1938 (age 88); Rochester, New York, U.S.
- Title: Milton R. Underwood Professor of Law Emeritus
- Awards: Brigham–Kanner Property Rights Prize (2006)

Academic background
- Education: Princeton University (BA); Harvard University (LLB); University of Virginia (MA, PhD)

Academic work
- Discipline: Property rights
- Institutions: Vanderbilt University

James W. Ely Jr. is an American historian and legal scholar who serves as the Milton R. Underwood Professor of Law Emeritus and Professor of History Emeritus at Vanderbilt University. He received his Ph.D. in history from the University of Virginia and his L.L.B. from Harvard University. Ely is a property rights expert, a legal historian, and an author and editor of several books that have received critical acclaim from legal scholars and historians.

== Early life and education ==
Ely Jr. was born in Rochester, New York, on January 20, 1938. He matriculated at Princeton University before earning a Bachelor of Laws at Harvard Law School, going on to earn a master's degree and PhD in history from the University of Virginia.

== Awards ==
Since joining the faculty of Vanderbilt University in 1972, he has been recognized by students as one of the university's outstanding teachers. In 2006, Ely was the recipient of the Brigham–Kanner Property Rights Prize, given to an outstanding scholar or individual whose work has advanced the cause of property rights and has contributed to the awareness of the important role property rights occupy in the overall scheme of individual liberty.

Also in 2006, Ely was also awarded the Owners' Counsel of American Crystal Eagle Award. Annually, OCA identifies individuals who have made a substantial contribution toward advancing private property rights, presenting the Crystal Eagle Award to each as a symbol of the freedoms protected through their work.

Ely received the Paul J. Hartman Outstanding Professor Award at Vanderbilt University in 1991, 1995, 1997, 1998, 2005.

In 2002, Ely was presented the Tennessee History Book Award for A History of the Tennessee Supreme Court.

== Selected publications ==
- The Contract Clause: A Constitutional History, University Press of Kansas (2016)
- The Law of Easements and Licenses in Land, Thomson Reuters/West (revised edition March 2010) (with Jon W. Bruce)
- The Guardian of Every Other Right: A Constitutional History of Property Rights, Oxford University Press (3rd ed. 2008, 2nd ed. 1998, 1st ed. 1992)
- Cases and Materials on Modern Property Law, Thomson/West (6th ed. 2007) (with Jon W. Bruce)
- The Bill of Rights in Modern America: After 200 Years, Indiana University Press (2nd ed. 2008, 1st ed. 1993) (co-edited with D. Bodenhamer)
- Oxford Companion to the Supreme Court, Oxford University Press (2nd ed. 2005) (co-edited with K. Hall and J. Grossman)
- American Legal History: Cases and Materials, Oxford University Press (3rd ed. 2005) (with Kermit L. Hall and Paul Finkelman)
- Railroads and American Law (University Press of Kansas, 2001)

== See also ==
- Brigham–Kanner Property Rights Conference
- Vanderbilt University
