= Waldo & Lyle =

Law firm based in Norfolk, Virginia

Waldo & Lyle, P.C.
- Headquarters: Norfolk, Virginia
- Major practice areas: Eminent Domain, Property Rights
- Date founded: July 20, 1998; 27 years ago
- Founder: Joseph T. Waldo
- Company type: Professional Corporation
- Website: waldoandlyle.com

Waldo & Lyle, P.C. is a law firm based in Norfolk, Virginia. The firm handles cases arising in Virginia, Washington, D.C., and surrounding states. The firm limits its practice to eminent domain and property rights matters.

== History ==
Joseph Waldo co-founded the law firm of Waldo & Tilhou in 1978. In 1984, Waldo & Tilhou merged with the law firm of Pender & Coward. Waldo left Pender & Coward in 1998, starting an independent practice in Norfolk, Virginia. One year later, Joseph Lyle, a managing partner at the law firm of Kaufman & Canoles, joined Waldo's practice, creating the law firm of Waldo & Lyle. The firm's practice is narrowly focused, limited to property rights matters and takings cases. The firm has only represented property owners whose property has been taken or damaged by the exercise of the power of eminent domain, or by other government action in inverse condemnation actions.

The firm has won precedent-setting cases in the field of takings law, including Commissioner of Highways v. Ramsey, Taco Bell of America, Inc. v. Commonwealth Transportation Commissioner of Virginia, Claytor v. Roanoke Redevelopment and Housing Authority, PKO Ventures, LLC v. Norfolk Redevelopment and Housing Authority, Norfolk Redevelopment and Housing Authority v. Central Radio Company Inc., Cartwright v. Commonwealth Transportation Commissioner, and Bergano v. City of Virginia Beach. The firm also achieved what was at the time the largest eminent domain award in Virginia's history in the matter of US v. 515 Granby, LLC.
