= Stephen M. Feldman =

American law professor (born 1955)

- Born: Stephen Matthew Feldman; 1955 (age 70–71)

Academic background
- Education: Hamilton College; University of Oregon School of Law; Stanford Law School

Academic work
- Institutions: University of Tulsa; University of Wyoming College of Law

Stephen Matthew Feldman (born 1955) is the Jerry H. Housel/Carl F. Arnold Distinguished Professor of Law at the University of Wyoming College of Law, where he is also an adjunct professor of Political Science. Prior to joining the University of Wyoming faculty in 2002, Feldman was a professor at the University of Tulsa. He is a member of the Order of the Coif, a former judicial clerk for the United States Court of Appeals for the Ninth Circuit, and a past National Endowment for the Humanities Research Fellow.

Feldman has written books and journal articles about Separation of Church and State and The American Revolution and Constitution, which include:

- Journal article:The American Revolution and Constitution, 1997
- Journal article: The Fruits of the Framing: Church and State in Nineteenth- and Early-Twentieth-Century America, 1997
- Feldman, Stephen M. (1997). Please Don't Wish Me a Merry Christmas: A Critical History of the Separation of Church and State. NYU Press. ISBN 978-0-8147-2684-6.

== See also ==
- Constitution of the United States
- American Revolution
