= Joseph W. Singer =

American legal theorist

Joseph Singer
- Born: Joseph William Singer

Academic background
- Education: Williams College (BA); Harvard University (MA, JD)

Academic work
- Discipline: Law
- Sub-discipline: Civil rights law Jurisprudence; Poverty law Civil procedure Federal Indian law
- Institutions: Harvard University

Joseph William Singer is an American legal scholar specializing in property law. He is the Bussey Professor of Law at Harvard University, where he has been teaching since 1992. Previously, he taught at Boston University School of Law and practiced law in Boston. He also served as a law clerk in the Supreme Court of New Jersey.

== Education ==
Singer earned a Bachelor of Arts degree in political economy from Williams College, a Master of Arts in political science from Harvard University, and a Juris Doctor from Harvard Law School.

== Career ==
Singer has authored an extensive body of work, including Entitlement: The Paradoxes of Property (Yale University Press, 2000), The Edges of the Field: Lessons on the Obligations of Ownership (Beacon Press, 2000), and No Freedom without Regulation: The Hidden Lesson of the Subprime Crisis (Yale University Press, 2015). In addition to his books on property law and federal Native American law, he has written more than 70 law review articles. In 2015, Singer was awarded the Brigham–Kanner Property Rights Prize from the William & Mary Law School for his contributions to the advancement of private property rights.
