= Gregory S. Alexander =

American lawyer and author

- Education: University of Illinois Urbana-Champaign (BA); Northwestern University (JD)
- Occupation: Law professor

Gregory S. Alexander is an American legal scholar. He currently serves as the A. Robert Noll Professor of Law at Cornell Law School. He authored several books.

== Biography ==
Alexander received an undergraduate degree at University of Illinois Urbana-Champaign, graduating in 1970. In 1973, he graduated from Northwestern University School of Law with a J.D. degree. From 1974-75, he was a Ph.D. candidate in the Department of Philosophy at the University of Chicago. After graduating, Alexander clerked on the U.S. Court of Appeals for the Sixth Circuit, after which he studied at the University of Chicago Law School as a Bigelow Fellow.

Alexander began teaching at the University of Georgia School of Law after studying as a Bigelow Fellow. In 1985, Alexander moved to Cornell Law School.

In 1997, Alexander received the American Publishers Association's 1997 Best Book of the Year in Law award for his work, Commodity and Propriety.

Alexander is a member of the American Law Institute, American Society for Legal History, Law & Society Association, and Order of the Coif.
