= Robert Ellickson =

American academic

- Education: Oberlin College; Yale Law School
- Scientific career
- Fields: Property law
- Workplaces: Yale Law School

Robert C. Ellickson is an American property law scholar. He is the Walter E. Meyer Professor of Property and Urban Law at Yale Law School, and was formerly on the faculty at the USC Gould School of Law and Stanford Law School. He is a fellow of the American Academy of Arts and Sciences and a past president of the American Law and Economics Association. Ellickson is the author of numerous books and articles on land use, property, and social norms, and is best known for his 1991 book Order Without Law: How Neighbors Settle Disputes. In that book, a study of ranchers and farmers in Shasta County, California, he argues that, contrary to the Coase theorem, neighbors in close-knit societies reach efficient outcomes in land and property use not by bargaining around legal rules but by largely ignoring them in favor of informal social norms. In 2008, Ellickson was awarded the Brigham–Kanner Property Rights Prize by the College of William & Mary School of Law for his body of work advancing the cause of private property rights.
