= William Eskridge =

American legal scholar (born 1951)

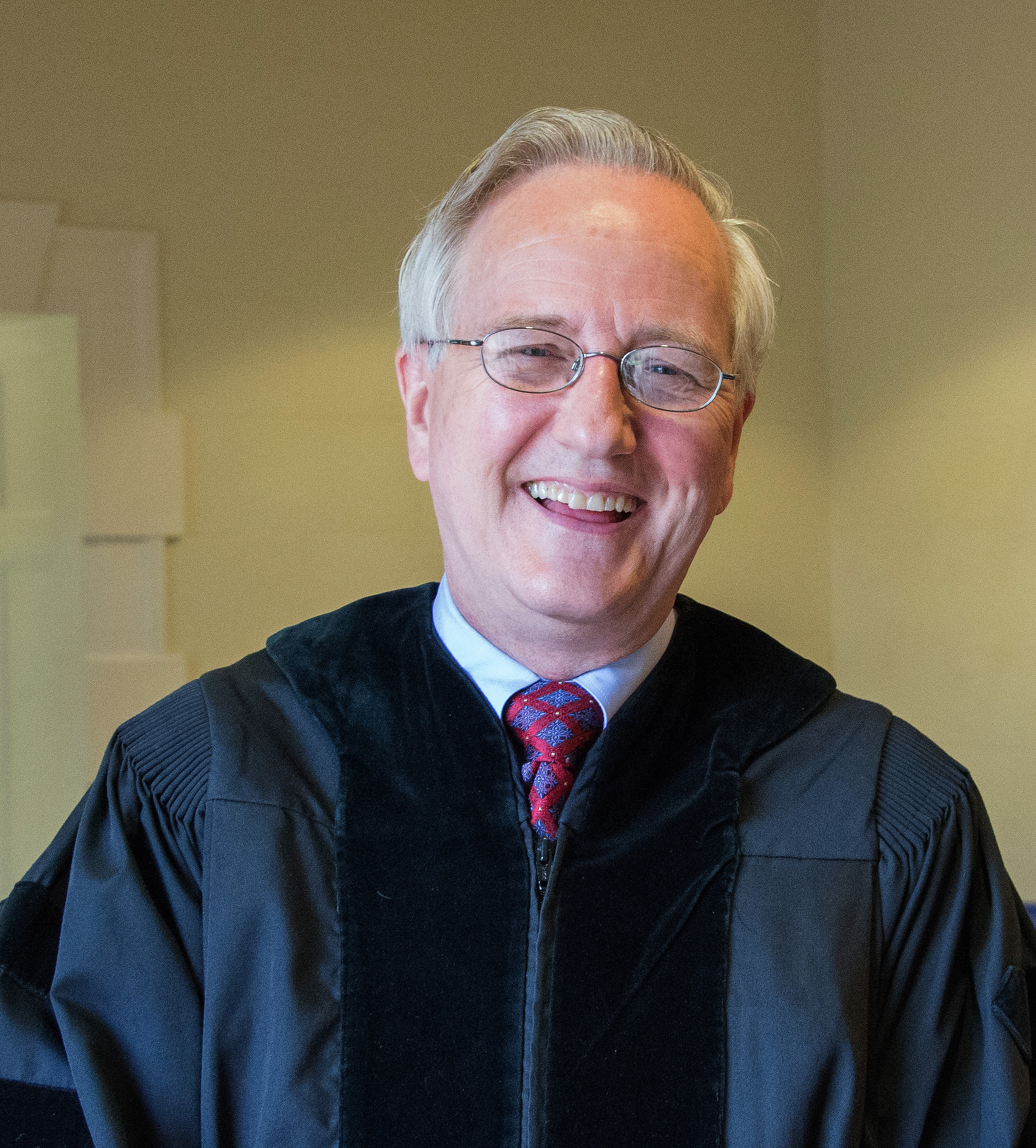
- Eskridge in 2015
- Born: William Nichol Eskridge Jr. October 27, 1951 (age 75); Princeton, West Virginia, U.S.

Academic background
- Education: Davidson College (BA); Harvard University (MA); Yale Law School (JD)

Academic work
- Discipline: Constitutional law
- Institutions: Yale University

William Nichol Eskridge Jr. (born October 27, 1951) is an American legal scholar who is the Alexander M. Bickel Professor of Public Law at Yale Law School. He is one of the most cited law professors in America, ranking fourth overall for the period 2016–2020. He writes primarily on constitutional law, legislation and statutory interpretation, religion, marriage equality, and LGBT rights.

== Early life and career ==
Eskridge was born and raised in West Virginia. When he was sixteen, he realized he was attracted to men, though "gay" wasn't the word used back then. He earned a BA in history from Davidson College in 1973, followed by an MA in history at Harvard University, and then a JD from Yale Law School in 1978. At Yale, he was an editor of the Yale Law Journal, where he worked with future Supreme Court Justice Sonia Sotomayor. After graduating from Yale, he clerked for Judge Edward Weinfeld on the US District Court for the Southern District of New York and then joined the DC law firm Shea & Gardner. In 1982, he became a professor at the University of Virginia School of Law (1982–1987), then at Georgetown Law (1987–1998), and then Yale Law School starting in 1998.

In 1994, Eskridge was granted a Guggenheim Fellowship.

== Legislation and statutory interpretation ==
With his Shea & Gardner friend, the late Philip Frickey, Eskridge developed a field-establishing casebook, Statutes and the Creation of Public Policy, published by the West Publishing Company in 1987 (now in its fifth edition). The Eskridge and Frickey materials were part of Eskridge's file for tenure at the University of Virginia, whose tenure committee largely dismissed the contribution, in part because it devoted too much discussion to the canons and theories of statutory interpretation. In the Virginia Law Review, Judge Richard Posner argued that the book essentially established the intellectual bona fides of a new and critically important field (Legislation) and that it ranked among the great landmark casebooks of the twentieth century. Legislation and Statutory Interpretation immediately emerged as a vibrant and important field of study, doctrinal development, and intellectual engagement. Eskridge subsequently published a series of classic articles (usually co-authored with Phil Frickey) developing themes first announced in the casebook. For example, Eskridge's 1990 article titled "The New Textualism" is the 75th most-cited law review article of all time, according to a 2012 study.

In 1994, Eskridge and Frickey published Henry Hart and Albert Sacks's The Legal Process (Foundation Press, 1994), with an historical and critical introduction to the highly influential legal process teaching materials originally developed by Hart and Sacks at Harvard Law School, but never published. In the same year, Eskridge and Frickey wrote the foreword to the Harvard Law Review's Supreme Court issue.

== Sexuality, gender, and the law ==
Between 1990 and 1995, Eskridge represented a gay couple seeking a marriage license in Washington, D.C. Like all the other early same-sex marriage cases, this one did not prevail, but for the first time in American history, one judge, John Ferren of the DC Court of Appeals, wrote an opinion finding discrimination against same-sex couples to be unconstitutional (Dean v. District of Columbia, 653 A.2d 307 (D.C. 1995)).

In 1996, Eskridge wrote his pathfinding book The Case for Same-Sex Marriage (Free Press 1996), arguing that marriage discrimination against LGBT couples violated both their fundamental right to marry and their equal protection right to be free of invidious state discrimination. The book was criticized at the time, with West Virginia US Senator Robert Byrd quoting extensively from it in his speech supporting the Defense of Marriage Act in 1996, an overwhelming, bipartisan rebuke to the marriage movement. Ultimately, many state courts and the US Supreme Court (Obergefell v. Hodges (2015)) adopted these arguments in favor of gay marriage. As Judge Posner put it in a 2015 "re-review" of Eskridge's 1996 book: "A prophet before his time, William Eskridge has the satisfaction of having finally been vindicated."

At the same time he was working on marriage rights for LGBT persons, Eskridge was working with Georgetown law professor Nan Hunter on teaching materials for a field they dubbed "Sexuality, Gender, and the Law". Eskridge and Hunter rejected the idea that the field should be defined as "Sexual Orientation and the Law", because they considered norms of gender and sexuality inextricably intertwined. Published by Foundation Press, Sexuality, Gender, and the Law is in its fifth edition as of 2023. Emerging from his work with Hunter, Eskridge published a series of articles on sodomy laws and other discriminatory laws harming gender and sexual minorities. An amicus brief he wrote for the Cato Institute and a law review article titled "Hardwick and Historiography". were cited by the majority opinion in Lawrence v. Texas (2003), where the Supreme Court invalidated consensual sodomy laws.

== Consumer law ==
Writing in 1984, Eskridge was the first legal scholar to argue that home buyers were taking on too much risk, especially in light of the market's creation of new kinds of loans with adjustable rates and other financial gimmicks.

== Bibliography ==
=== Books ===
- Interpreting Law: A Primer on How to Read Statutes and the Constitution (2016), ISBN 978-1-63459-912-2
- A Republic of Statutes: The New American Constitution (2010), ISBN 978-0-300-19979-6
- Dishonorable Passions: Sodomy Laws in America, 1861-2003, ISBN 978-0-670-01862-8
- Gay Marriage: For Better or For Worse? (2006) (co-authored with Darren Spedale), ISBN 978-0-19-532697-0
- Equality Practice: Civil Unions and the Future of Gay Rights (2002), ISBN 978-0-415-93072-7
- Gaylaw: Challenging the Apartheid of the Closet (1999)
- The Case for Same-Sex Marriage: From Sexual Liberty to Civilized Commitment (1996), ISBN 978-0-674-34161-6
- Dynamic Statutory Interpretation (1994), ISBN 978-0-674-21878-9

=== Selected articles ===
- "The First Marriage Cases, 1970-74," in Love Unites Us: Winning the Freedom to Marry in America 21-27 (Kevin M. Cathcart & Leslie J. Gabel-Brett, eds., 2016)
- "Law and the Production of Deceit," in Austin Sarat ed., Law and Lies: Deception and Truth-Telling in the American Legal System 254-312 (2015)
- "Nino's Nightmare: Legal Process Theory as a Jurisprudence of Toggling Between Facts and Norms," 57 St. Louis U.L. Rev. 865 (2012)
- "The California Proposition 8 Case: What Is a Constitution For," 98 Cal. L. Rev. 1235 (2010)
- "Sexual and Gender Variation in American Public Law: From Malignant to Tolerable to Benign," 57 UCAL L. Rev. 1333 (2010)
- "The California Supreme Court, 2007-2008—Foreword: The Marriage Cases, Reversing the Burden of Inertia in a Pluralist Democracy," Cal. L. Rev. (2009)
- "A Pluralist Theory of Equal Protection," U. Pa. J. Const'l L. (2009)
- No Promo Homo: The Sedimentation of Antigay Discourse and the Channeling Effect of Judicial Review, 75 NYU L. Rev. 1327 (2000)
- Destabilizing Due Process and Evolutive Equal Protection, 47 UCLA L. Rev. 1183 (2000)
- Race and Sexual Orientation in the Military: Ending the Apartheid of the Closet, 2 Reconstruction 52 (1993)
- A History of Same-Sex Marriage, 79 Va. L. Rev. 1419 (1993)
- One Hundred Years of Ineptitude, 70 Va. l. Rev. 1083 (1984)
- Dunlop v. Bachowski & the Limits of Judicial Review under Title IV of the LMRDA, 86 Yale L.J. 885 (1977) (student note)

Awards
Preceded by Barrie Jean Borich	Stonewall Book Award for Non-fiction; 2001	Succeeded by Barry Werth
Preceded by Mark Doty	Stonewall Book Award for Non-fiction; 2009	Succeeded by Nathaniel Frank
