= Supreme Court reform in the United States =

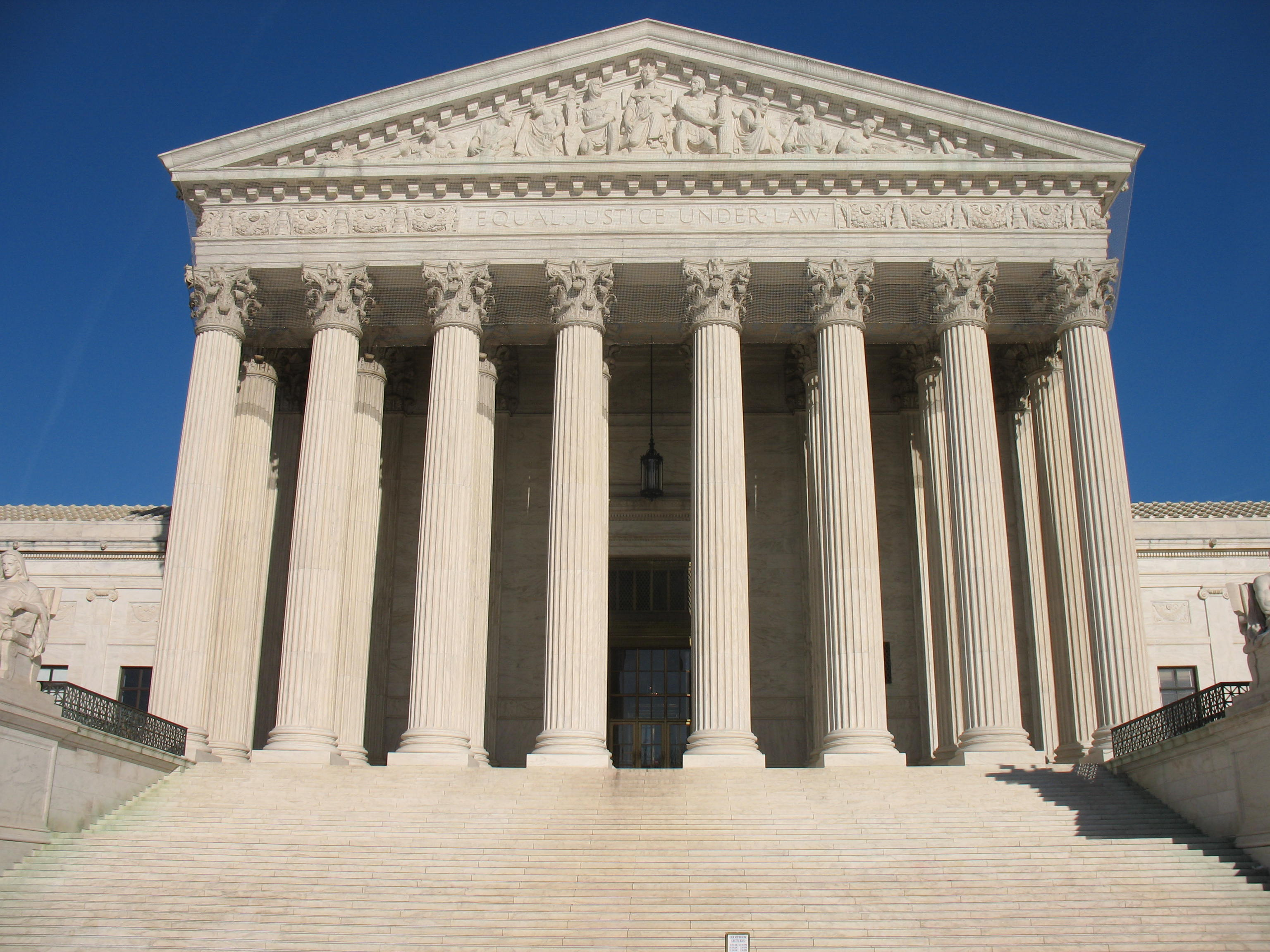
United States Supreme Court Building

Debates over U.S. Supreme Court reform center on the tension between its powerful unelected role and democratic accountability. The Constitution leaves Congress broad authority to shape the Court’s structure—fueling recurring political and scholarly proposals to alter its size, tenure, and jurisdiction. As the only unelected branch of the federal government of the United States, the Supreme Court is the subject of heavy contention in public debate and has been since before the U.S. Constitution's drafting. The Supreme Court holds high importance in the American system as the final judicial check on both legislative and executive power.

The debates around reform hinge on the counter-majoritarian difficulty, a feature identified by legal scholar Alexander Bickel, of the U.S. governmental system in which one branch (the judiciary) can overrule the democratically implemented will of the majority. The Supreme Court's composition and structure is extremely fluid in nature. As laid out in Article Three of the U.S. Constitution, the only clear explanation of the Supreme Court is that "The judicial Power of the United States, shall be vested in one supreme Court". With this vague description of power, the U.S. Congress remains in charge of all specifics of the Court and its operation, with discretion over jurisdiction, number of justices, tenure of justices, etc. Congressional power over the Court warrants debate, as politicians often promise reform when running for office. The debate over Supreme Court reform is commented on in academic, judicial, executive, and legislative circles in the United States.

== Background ==
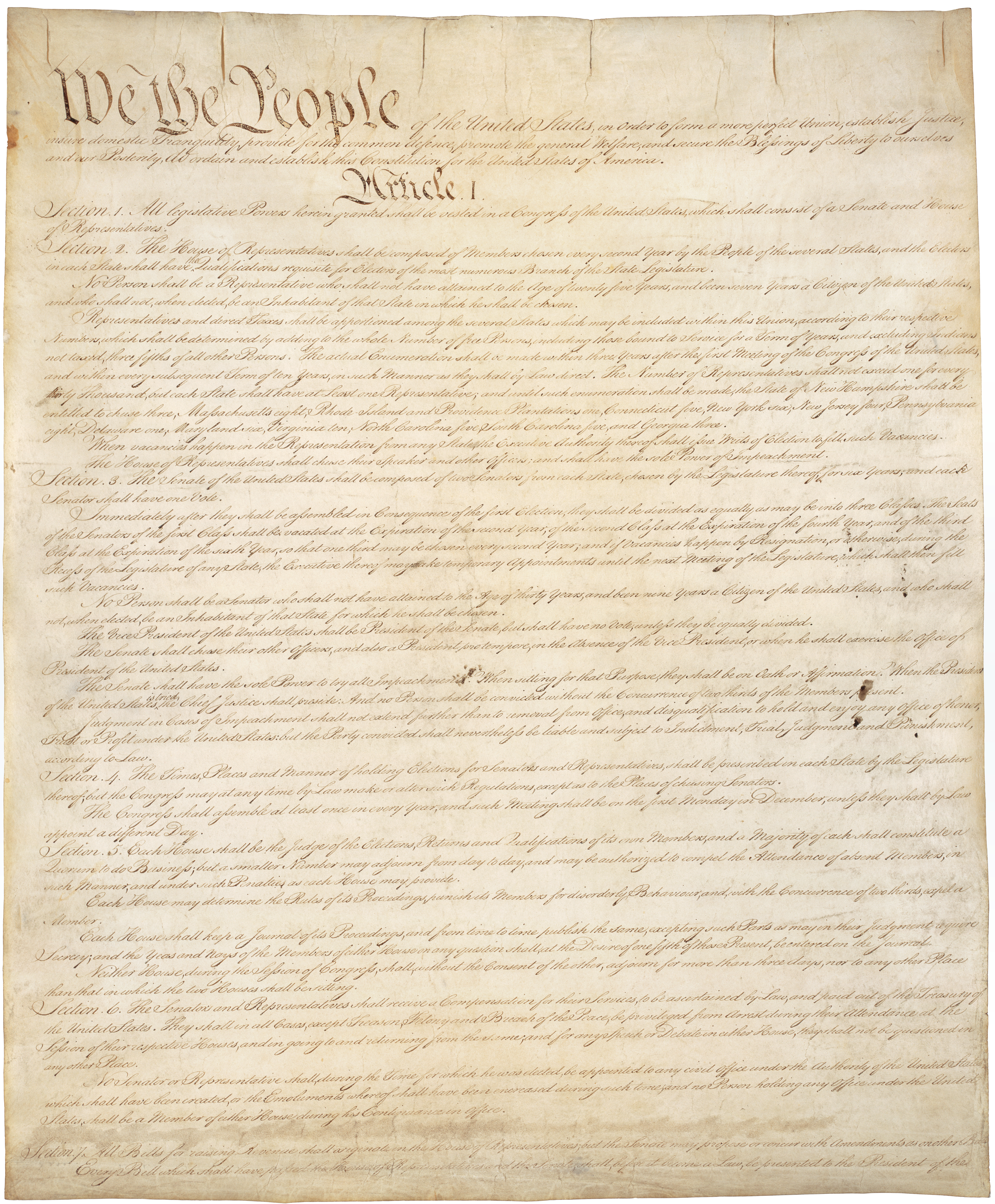
United States Constitution

Section 1 of Article III of the U.S. Constitution, which establishes the judicial branch of the federal government, reads as follows:

The judicial Power of the United States, shall be vested in one supreme Court, and in such inferior Courts as the Congress may from time to time ordain and establish. The Judges, both of the supreme and inferior Courts, shall hold their Offices during good Behaviour, and shall, at stated Times, receive for their Services a Compensation which shall not be diminished during their Continuance in Office.

The section outlines only the existence of the Supreme Court of the United States, leaving open all substantive aspects of the Court's composition. It sets no qualifications for the justices besides "good Behaviour," no recommendation for a number of justices, no description of term-length or tenure, no outline of jurisdiction (original or appellate), and no specifics about the appointment process. The section's ambiguity leaves ample room for Congress to operate in administering the Court, and the legislature has historically vacillated in how it sets up the body. The ability to reform the Court has become fodder for politicians during times of heavy scrutiny on the Court.

The Constitution outlays the counter-majoritarian difficulty as a feature of the governmental system, allowing a small, unelected body to temper the popular will. When operating perfectly, the antidemocratic Supreme Court should keep the democratic process on the right track against fleeting popular passions. Many scholars argue that this phenomenon is antithetical to the American democratic ethos on which the nation was founded. The difficulty creates a balancing test in administration of the court between the majority and the Constitution.

== Reform options and arguments ==
Final report of the Presidential Commission on the Supreme Court of the United States (PCSCOTUS)

Presidents from many parties have campaigned on reforming the Supreme Court through structural and ideological means, including more recent presidents taking aim at judicial activism. Andrew Jackson looked to curtail judicial overreach in opposition to big government, Abraham Lincoln wanted to ensure anti-slavery principles, Franklin D. Roosevelt attempted to push through New Deal legislation by means of SCOTUS reform, Ronald Reagan appointed justices like Robert Bork to inject specific ideological constitutional interpretation, and Joe Biden created the commission (PCSCOTUS) to explore reform.

A few proposals, examined in depth by the Supreme Court commission, have repeatedly reappeared in public discourse as ways to amend the operation of the Supreme Court. An important factor in determining the validity of these reforms is to identify the political context in which they originate. Oftentimes, presidents and politicians recommend altering the Court as a response to unfavorable decisions. It’s politically motivated proposals that draw the ire of the general public, however, politicians rarely float reforms to solve structural problems of the Court like efficiency or workload.

=== Expansion ===
One proposed reform is expanding the size of the Court, meaning the number of justices on the bench.

In the 117th, 118th, and 119th Congresses, bills were introduced to expand the Court in the Senate by Senator Edward Markey (D-MA) and in the House by Representatives Hank Johnson (D-GA-4) and Al Green (D-TX-9).

Senator Elizabeth Warren endorsed expanding the Court in 2021, and in July 2026, former vice president Kamala Harris called for increasing it to 13 justices.

Supporters argue that expansion could correct a perceived political imbalance on the Court. Opponents argue that changing the Court’s size for political purposes could weaken judicial independence, increase perceptions that the judiciary is partisan, and lead to retaliatory expansions by future congressional majorities. Supporters counter that the Court is already politicized and that structural changes could improve its legitimacy.

The Constitution does not set the Court’s size. After establishing the original six-member Court in 1789, Congress changed its authorized size multiple times during the 19th century, most recently setting it at nine justices in 1869—one for each of the nine judicial circuits then in existence.

=== Term limits ===
A proposal that is generally much more politically favorable in a bipartisan context is introducing term limits for the justices. Ironically, these term limits are the most constitutionally dubious of all reforms, for one of the few specifications of Article III Section 1 is that justices shall serve during good behavior.

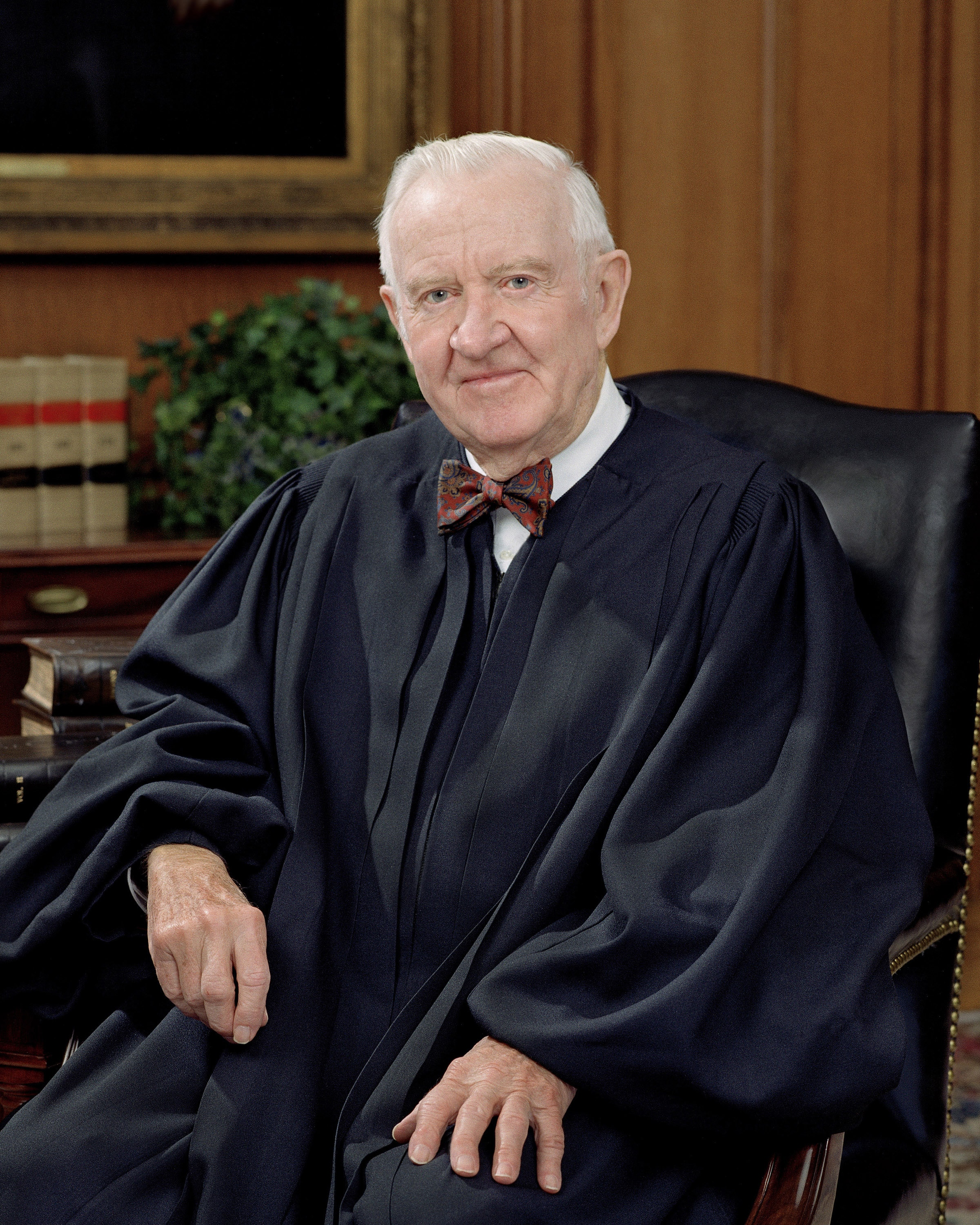
John Paul Stevens, the oldest ever serving justice at 90 years old

Proponents of this practice note the singularity of lifetime tenure on the United States Supreme Court. In other countries and in most of the United States, supreme court justices do not have the luxury of lifetime tenure. As noted in the Supreme Court commission's report, the United States is the only constitutional democracy in the world to allow lifetime appointments. The lifetime tenure system introduces arbitrary roadblocks that influence the appointment process. Justices die (or on rare occasions retire) at various, random intervals that allow presidents varying numbers of appointments based on random chance.

Often recommended to be made 18 years long and non-renewable, term limits would accomplish two main goals. One, they would make sure that presidents get to appoint at least two justices, four if the president wins reelection, making the nomination process more predictable and closer in line with electoral outcomes. This would make the judiciary as a whole responsive to the American public. Two, it would maintain the independence that justices currently hold on the bench, potentially decreasing their responsiveness to political pressure by eliminating the need for strategic retirements.

Opponents of this system argue that these term limits could be constitutionally dubious. Additionally, they note that this particular reform makes justices act more like representatives of political parties than they currently are. Since presidents would "get" two appointments, the process could become more politicized, worsening a current problem of the appointment process. This reform would likely necessitate a constitutional amendment.

=== Jurisdiction stripping ===
Jurisdiction stripping, or limiting the types of issues on which the Court may rule, could take some politically volatile issues out of the justices’ hands, abortion rights being a prime example. Addressed in Article III, Congress has the power to make exceptions to the Court’s jurisdiction. The reform can be seen through multiple lenses. The argument can be made that some of these sensitive political issues should stay within the bounds of the political bodies, Congress and the president. On the other side of the coin, proponents often recommend this reform for more partisan purposes: to eliminate the possibility of the Court ruling against partisan legislation. The details of this proposal, which the Supreme Court commission dissected in depth, can become very complex. Constitutional scholars disagree over how exactly this process would work, its downstream effects, and its specific constitutionality.

=== Supermajority rules ===
This reform would make a supermajority vote required when the Court is addressing the conduct or legislation of the other two branches of government. It can, at times, also institute a deferential requirement on constitutional questions. The crux of the reform is making it more difficult for the unelected Supreme Court to invalidate the actions of the elected branches of the federal government. Many state and federal courts follow this supermajority system; this often manifests in three-judge-panels that must vote 2:1 to come to a decision.

Proponents of this system argue that the reform would provide additional deference to the elected branches of government, legislative and executive. By deferring to these branches, the Court would preserve more of the popular will in their decision making because it would be more difficult to overturn actions of democratically elected branches. Proponents point to recent 5–4 decisions on important constitutional questions as examples of a judiciary that decides on too slim margins, not exhibiting enough consensus. They also say that this reform would incentivize consensus-building among judges. Opponents identify that this proposal could cut against one of the key roles of the Supreme Court, resisting majoritarian overreach as an antidemocratic body. By raising the bar of overturning constitutionality, the Court would have a much more difficult time doing its job.

=== Congressional override ===
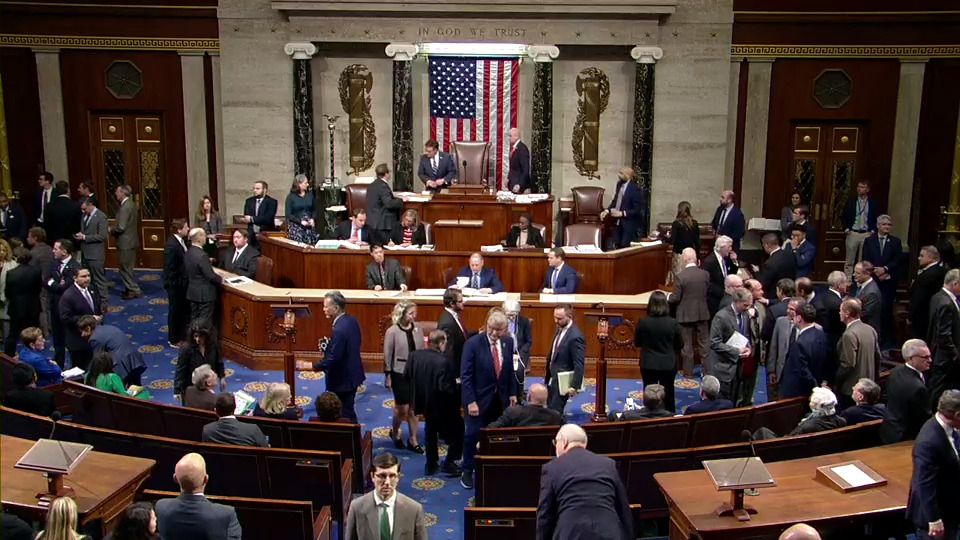
United States House of Representatives

The final, often-discussed reform to the Supreme Court is a legislative override as a final check on judicial power. This would allow Congress to veto judicial decisions that overturn constitutionality of federal laws. The proposal would have to be accomplished through a constitutional amendment. Proposals for the process generally agree that the override should follow the general federal legislative process, being agreed upon by both the House and Senate and needing the president’s vote. Some proposals encourage a supermajority vote by the legislature.

Supporters of the measure argue that this would allow for a final democratic examination of some Supreme Court actions, keeping final say in the hands of the people. It could temper an unelected judiciary from straying too far from the popular will in the country. Opponents raise similar rejoinders to those against supermajority rules: instituting this practice would eliminate the counter-majoritarianism that the Court aims to foster.

== Notable structural reform successes and attempts ==
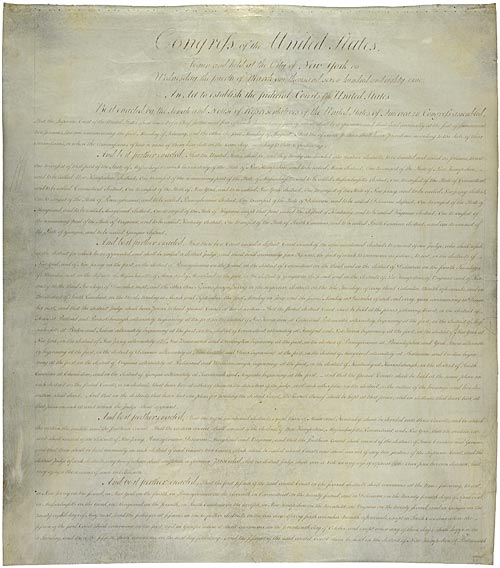
Judiciary Act of 1789

Through time, Congress has done much to address this counter-majoritarian balancing test. They often did this by altering the size and practices of the Supreme Court, reforming it mostly through changing the number of justices on the bench, often for political reasons tied to national politics. However, Congress has rarely altered the jurisdiction of the Court.

=== 1789 Judiciary Act ===
As one of the first acts of the newly created Congress, the legislature signed the Judiciary Act of 1789 on September 24, 1789. This law established the first federal court system distinct from state courts. Left with the open question of structure posed in Article III of the Constitution, Congress had to decide the structure of the court system themselves. They decided that they could regulate all federal jurisdiction and finely outlined the jurisdiction of the district courts and the circuit courts. In line with the outlays in Article I, Congress gave original jurisdiction to the Supreme Court as well as additional appellate jurisdiction from lower courts both in and outside of the federal system. The act laid out the first composition of the Court, consisting of a Chief Justice and five associate justices. This law serves as the core of the federal court system that survives in large part today. Key to the issue of the Supreme Court, the Judiciary Act of 1789 affirmed that SCOTUS would serve as the highest court in the land, the appellate body to interpret the words of the Framers through the Constitution.

==== Early issues ====
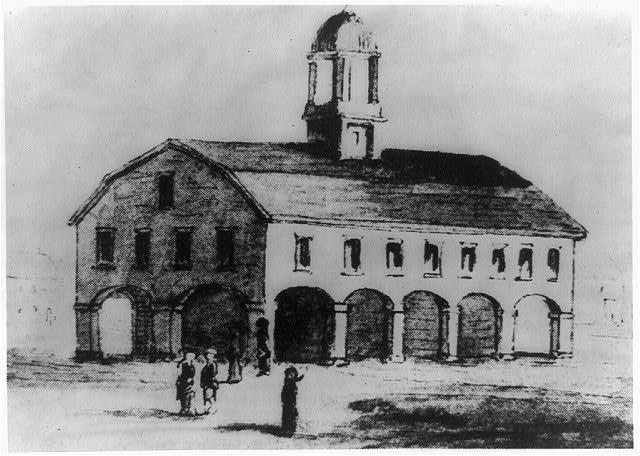
Royal Exchange Building, the first home of the Court

The initial Court was plagued with issues, although they were far less political than and even antithetical to the ones discussed today. The included the location of the Court's proceedings, a lack of general prestige and respect, and the dreaded problem of "riding circuit". The early court had no designated building to call its home. They first met in The Exchange, a converted marketplace near Water Street in New York City. This building was neither grand nor specific to the use of the Supreme Court — city workers moved the businesses from inside the building across the street during the inaugural session. As the federal government moved to Pennsylvania, the Court held session in three buildings including Old City Hall, Independence Hall, and Congress Hall in Philadelphia. From 1801 to the 1930s, the Court moved around different interior spaces of the US Capitol as it lacked a building to call its own. It wasn’t until Cass Gilbert designed the Supreme Court Building in 1935 that the Justices had a permanent space for business.

A larger issue for the Court was prestige and respect, a complaint echoing issues of today, but rooting from different causes. During the first meeting of the Supreme Court, only four of the six justices even showed up for the meeting. Many of them were disillusioned by the affairs of the Court, some even held other positions while doing their job as a Justice. John Jay for example, the first chief justice, violated separation of powers by holding a diplomatic post to negotiate with Great Britain in addition to his membership on the Court — the judiciary didn’t have enough power to be attractive on its own. Jay left the Court to become governor of New York and refused to retake the position of Chief Justice. The first decisions of the body were mostly to determine administrative procedure, and the Court continued, enervated, until the appointment of John Marshall as chief justice.

The final and most debilitating issue of the early Court was known as "riding circuit", a practice in which the Justices traveled to federal circuit courts to serve as judges for four to six months outside of the Supreme Court’s eight-week-term. The practice saved money, provided experience to circuit courts, and let justices teach the public about their role. But the negatives outnumbered the positives, with the justices traveling on poor roads with primitive travel methods through unpredictable weather. The practice was abhorred by the justices who at times risked their lives to ride circuit.

=== 1801 Midnight Judges Act ===
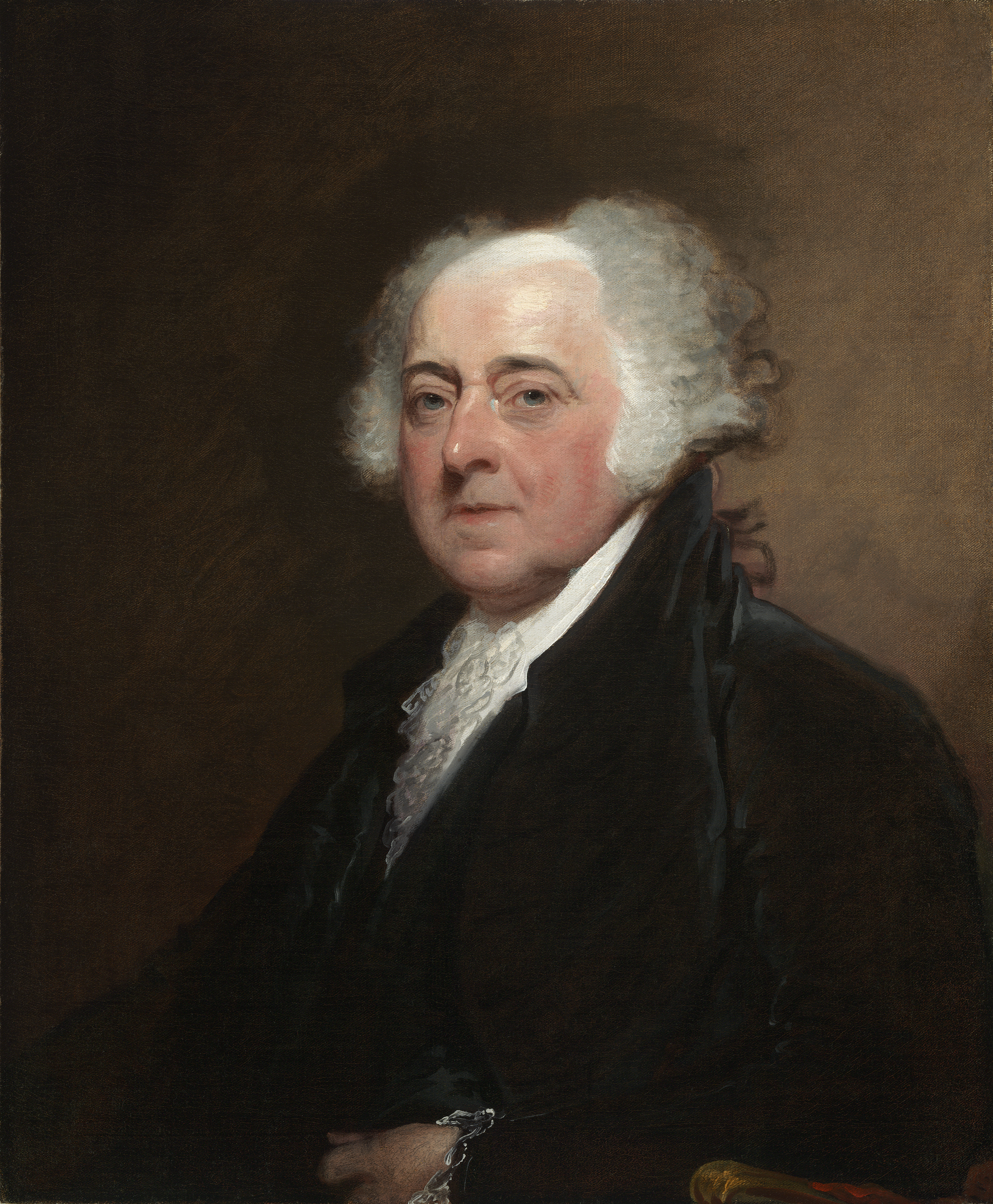
John Adams

In 1801, the John Adams administration supported the partisan Midnight Judges Act, a piece of legislation to organize more conveniently the federal court system. This marked one of the first heavily political interventions in the Court. The Act focused mostly on lower courts, but had an effect on the Supreme Court. While the Act eliminated circuit riding, Adams looked to curtail judicial power by reducing the size of the Court to five justices. The act laid the groundwork for Marbury v. Madison, which would establish the process of judicial review for the Court. These developments led to early debates on the power of the court and set the stage for subsequent ones. The Jefferson administration overturned the act before the changes could take place, but this act from the Adams administration showed a strong attempt at wielding political power through the judiciary in trying to prevent the incoming president, Thomas Jefferson from appointing new justices.

=== 1807–1863 Judiciary Acts ===
In the years between 1807 and 1863, the size of the United States grew immensely. In reaction to this expansion, Congress added a number of federal circuits. These circuits brought with them the creation of additional Supreme Court Justice positions. The acts included the Judiciary Act of 1807 (increase to seven justices), the Judiciary Act of 1837 (increased to nine justices and expanded jurisdiction over slaveholding states to ensure a pro-slavery judiciary), and the Tenth Circuit Act of 1863 (increased to 10 justices during the Civil War largely as a reaction to Dred Scott v. Stanford).

=== 1866 Judicial Circuits Act ===
In the first major policy after the Civil War, Congress passed the Judicial Circuits Act with the signature of President Andrew Johnson, which gradually reduced the number of justices from 10 to seven (in practice, the act only reduced the Court to eight justices) and decreased the number of federal circuits. This act was another highly political intervention into American politics as a Congress emboldened by a Civil War victory used its influence to reduce the political power of southern states through a reduction of circuit courts. This act, despite being signed by Johnson, took aim at his political influence through presidential appointment of justices. A Radical Republican-controlled Congress reduced the number of Supreme Court justices to limit the president’s power. This represents a political intervention on behalf of Congress, not the president.

=== 1869 Judiciary Act ===
The 1869 Judiciary Act, which once again increased the size of the Supreme Court to nine justices was the last major successful intervention to alter the size of the judiciary.

=== 1937 Judicial Procedures Reform Bill ===
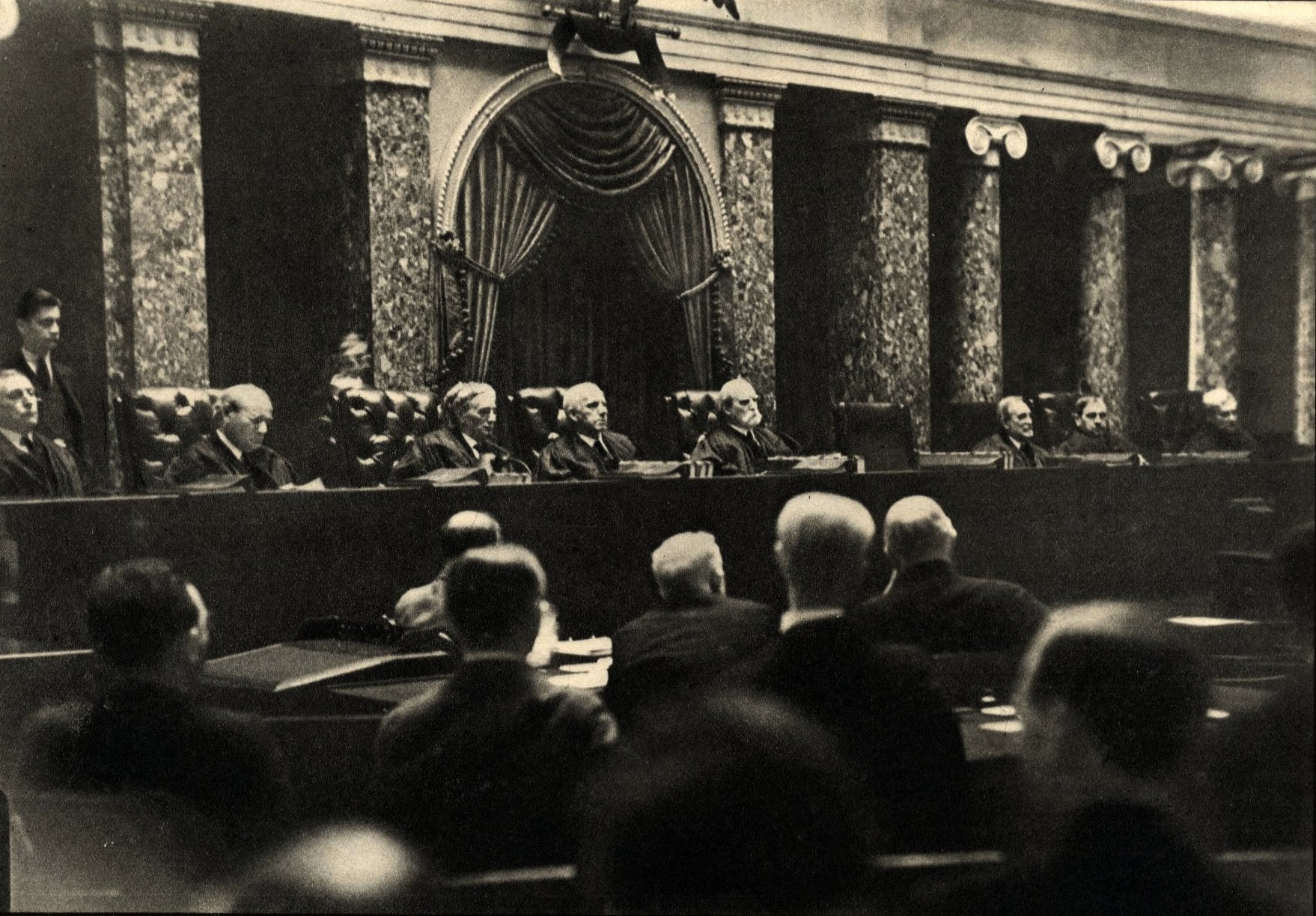
The Court in 1937, the year of Franklin D. Roosevelt's court-packing plan

In 1937, President Franklin D. Roosevelt was struck time and again by Supreme Court rulings unfavorable to his expansionary New Deal legislation aimed at alleviating the strains of the Great Depression. On May 27, 1935, a day known as Black Monday, the Roosevelt administration received three separate rulings against their New Deal legislation. His solution to this problem was a bill to expand the size of the Supreme Court, appointing his own justices and reducing the individual influence of the others. The reform is often known as Roosevelt's court-packing plan.

Roosevelt introduced the legislation in a Fireside Chat address to the nation, laying into the Court’s current procedures. Within weeks of the introduction, Supreme Court decisions regarding the power of Congress to regulate economic activity began favoring the president's agenda (notably in West Coast Hotel v. Parrish, a case that expanded the Court's reading of the commerce clause in favor of labor protections aligned with the President's priorities). This ruling is often taken in the context of Roosevelt's political pressure campaign against the Court and is a good example of the power presidents can have in influencing the Court without direct intervention. The Roosevelt legislation failed in Congress and often faced political ire from the president’s own party.

== See also ==
- List of impeachment investigations of United States federal judges
- Other reforms:
  - Reform of the United States Senate
  - Efforts to reform the United States Electoral College
