= Majoritarianism =

Political philosophy

Majoritarianism is a political philosophy or ideology with an agenda asserting that a majority, whether based on a religion, language, social class, or other category of the population, is entitled to a certain degree of primacy in society, and has the right to make decisions that affect the society. This traditional view has come under growing criticism, and liberal democracies have increasingly included constraints on what the parliamentary majority can do, in order to protect citizens' fundamental rights.

== Types ==
Majoritarianism, as a concept of government, branches out into several forms. The classic form includes unicameralism and a unitary state. Qualified majoritarianism is a more inclusionary form, with degrees of decentralization and federalism. Integrative majoritarianism incorporates several institutions to preserve minority groups and foster moderate political parties.

== Advocates and critics ==
Advocates of majoritarianism argue that majority decision making is intrinsically democratic and that any restriction on majority decision making is intrinsically undemocratic. If democracy is restricted by a constitution that cannot be changed by a simple majority decision, then yesterday's majority is being given more weight than today's. If it is restricted by some small group, such as aristocrats, judges, priests, soldiers, or philosophers, then society becomes an oligarchy. The only restriction acceptable in a majoritarian system is that a current majority has no right to prevent a different majority emerging in the future; this could happen, for example, if a minority persuades enough of the majority to change its position. In particular, a majority cannot exclude a minority from future participation in the democratic process. Majoritarianism does not prohibit a decision being made by representatives as long as this decision is made via majority rule, as it can be altered at any time by any different majority emerging in the future.

=== Criticism ===
One critique of majoritarianism is that systems without supermajority requirements for changing the rules for voting can be shown to likely be unstable. Among other critiques of majoritarianism is that most decisions in fact take place not by majority rule, but by plurality, unless the voting system purposefully channels votes for candidates or options in such a way as to guarantee a majority, such as is done under contingent voting, two-round voting and instant-runoff voting. According to Gibbard's theorem and Arrow's paradox, it is not possible to have a voting system with more than two options that retains adherence to both certain "fairness" criteria and rational decision-making criteria.

Unchecked majoritarianism may threaten the rights of minority groups. Some democracies have tried to resolve this by requiring supermajority support to enact changes to basic rights. For example, in the United States, the rights to freedom of speech and freedom of religion are written into the constitution, meaning it would take more than a simple majority of the members of Congress to repeal the rights. Other democracies have sought to address threats to minority rights by adopting proportional voting systems that guarantee at least some seats in their national legislatures to minority political factions. Examples include New Zealand, where mixed-member proportional voting is used, and Australia, where a single transferable vote system is used. Whether these methods have succeeded in protecting minority interests, or have gone too far, remains a matter for debate.

== History and legacy ==
There are relatively few instances of large-scale majority rule in recorded history, most notably the majoritarian system of Athenian democracy and other ancient Greek city-states. However, some argue that none of those Greek city-states were truly majority rule, particularly due to their exclusion of women, non-landowners, and slaves from decision-making processes. Most of the famous ancient philosophers staunchly opposed majoritarianism, because decisions based on the will of the uneducated and uninformed 'masses' are not necessarily wise or just. Plato is a prime example with his Republic, which describes a societal model based on a tripartite class structure. Anarchist anthropologist David Graeber offers a reason as to why majority democratic government is so scarce in the historical record. "Majority democracy, we might say, can only emerge when two factors coincide: 1. a feeling that people should have equal say in making group decisions, and 2. a coercive apparatus capable of enforcing those decisions." Graeber argues that those two factors almost never meet: "Where egalitarian societies exist, it is also usually considered wrong to impose systematic coercion. Where a machinery of coercion did exist, it did not even occur to those wielding it that they were enforcing any sort of popular will."

== See also ==
- Argumentum ad populum – Fallacy of claiming the majority is always correct
- Collectivism and individualism – Pattern of relationships between and among individuals and social groups
- Consensus decision-making – Group decision-making aiming for universal agreement
- Consensus democracy – Form of government
- Counter-majoritarian difficulty – Perceived problem with judicial review
- Majoritarian democracy – Form of government
- Median voter theorem – Theorem in political science
- Minoritarianism – Primacy of a minority in decision-making (opposite)
- Minority rights – Rights of members of minority groups
- Nationalism – Ideology promoting the nation-state
- Ochlocracy – Democracy spoiled by demagoguery and the rule of passion over reason
- Popular democracy – Notion of direct democracy
- Populism – Political ideology emphasising the "common people"
- Tyranny of the majority – Inherent oppressive potential of simple majority rule
- Utilitarian ethics – Ethical theory based on maximizing well-being
