= Reform of the United States Senate =

Proposed reforms to the United States Senate

Reform of the United States Senate, the upper house of the United States Congress, has been a topic of discussion in US politics since the country's creation.

The United States Senate was initially elected indirectly by state legislatures. Reformers from Andrew Johnson to the Populist Party proposed direct election by voters, which was adopted in the Seventeenth Amendment.

The Senate's apportionment system provides two Senators per state, which provides small-population states substantially more power per voter than large-population states. A majority of Founding Fathers opposed this system, but accepted it as a compromise to unify the young postwar country. Reformers propose several remedies, from shifting Senate apportionment to better reflect the US population, to reducing the powers of the Senate, to outright Senate abolition.

== History ==
The history of unicameralism in the United States began with the American Revolution: The provisional government of the early United States was unicameral from 1775–1788 and three revolutionary states had unicameral legislatures: Georgia (1777–1789), Pennsylvania (1776–1790), and Vermont (1776–1836).

As of 2026 three US states and territories have a unicameral legislature: The Nebraska Legislature (since 1937), the Legislature of Guam (since 1950), and the Legislature of the Virgin Islands (since 1954). Other states have considered or passed reforms to adopt unicameral legislatures, but none have taken effect.

=== 1776–1781: American Revolutionary era ===
During the American Revolution, the United States' provisional Congress was unicameral, with no upper and lower chamber. Both the First Continental Congress (1774) and Second Continental Congress (1775–1781) were unicameral, giving each state one vote.

After the Declaration of Independence and during the Revolutionary War, 11 of 13 states fully rewrote their constitutions. Of those, nine chose bicameral legislatures, while two chose unicameral legislatures (Pennsylvania and Georgia). In addition, the Vermont Republic adopted a unicameral legislature. In general, states with conventions dominated by "moderate" patriots modelled their legislature on the bicameral Parliament of the United Kingdom (with its House of Commons and House of Lords), while those dominated by "radical" pro-democracy patriots adopted unicameral legislatures. "Radical" patriots sought to prevent the creation of a new American aristocracy, leading them to oppose an upper house and to support more expansive voting rights, to prevent a new elite from consolidating political power.

The 1776 Pennsylvania Constitution created a highly democratic government structure that featured a unicameral legislature, a collective executive, a weak governor with no gubernatorial veto, appointment of judges by the legislature (rather than Governor), and voting rights for all adult men who paid taxes, including both White and Black men, in contrast to the property requirements of other states. Pennsylvania's Constitution also banned imprisonment as a punishment for debt and created public schools in each county. The 1776 Constitution was based substantially on Thomas Paine's Common Sense. In 1790, moderates gained power in the state legislature, called a new constitutional convention, and rewrote the constitution. The 1790 Pennsylvania Constitution created a single executive, gave the executive veto power, and created a new upper house. Benjamin Franklin, president of Pennsylvania's 1776 constitutional convention, strongly opposed the upper house. In 1789, Franklin argued that an upper house would give the wealthy a distinct institutional base and begin an aristocracy. Thomas Paine strongly opposed the new Constitution, calling it "a departure from the principles" of representative government and a mere "copy in miniature of the government of England".

In Vermont, the drafters of the 1777 Vermont Constitution modelled it on Pennsylvania, but went further, by banning all adult slavery and by permitting all men over the age of 21 to vote, regardless of wealth. Vermont's unicameral legislature was abolished by an 1836 constitutional amendment, which created an upper chamber.

In Georgia, the drafters of the 1777 Georgia Constitution established a unicameral assembly, voting rights for all White adult men who paid taxes, and mandatory voting. Georgia's unicameral legislature was abolished by the 1789 Georgia Constitution, which created an upper and lower chamber.

=== 1787: Constitutional Convention ===
After the end of the American Revolutionary War, the postwar United States government remained unicameral under the Articles of Confederation, in which the Congress of the Confederation (1781–1788) gave each state one vote.

During the 1787 Constitutional Convention, the vast majority of attendees supported bicameralism with a "people's house" lower chamber that was apportioned by population. However, discussion about how to apportion the upper chamber was deeply contentious, and the drafters of the Constitution debated more about how to award representation in the Senate than about any other part of the Constitution.

The Virginia Plan contemplated representation in both chambers based on population or financial contribution. James Madison and James Wilson opposed equal voting by states in the Senate, arguing that political authority came from the people and that allowing a minority of the population to control the majority violated republican principles. Wilson supported the direct popular election of senators and strongly rejected any deviation from proportional representation, arguing: "For whom do we form a constitution, for men, or for imaginary beings called States, a mere metaphysical distinction? Will a regard to State rights justify the sacrifice of the rights of men?" Madison suggested that equal representation by state, instead of population-proportional representation, meant the "proper foundation of Government was destroyed" and enshrined "improper principles" in law. Although Madison later defended the compromise in Federalist No. 62, he described equal state suffrage at the convention as an expedient concession rather than a principle of democratic representation. Law professor Burt Neuborne says Madison, writing in Federalist No. 62, "called the Senate a necessary compromise with principle and warned the nation not to seek any theoretical justification for it". Opposition to the proposed Senate also came from democratic elements among the Anti-Federalists. Their objections were not limited to equal state representation: critics argued that the chamber's small size, six-year terms, indirect election and extensive powers could make it an aristocratic institution remote from ordinary voters.

In the end, some small states — unwilling to give up their equal power with larger states under the Articles of Confederation — threatened to secede. The small states won the day by a 5–4 vote in favor of the "Connecticut Compromise", which provided that each state — regardless of population — would be represented by two senators.

These "yes" votes represented a minority of the population. Out of twelve eligible states, the delegations from five voted yes (Connecticut, Delaware, Maryland, New Jersey, North Carolina), four voted no (Pennsylvania, Virginia, South Carolina, Georgia), three did not vote (Massachusetts, who were divided; New York, who were divided and had just 1 of 3 delegates; and New Hampshire, who had not arrived), and one rejected the entire Convention (Rhode Island). The 1790 United States census suggests that the delegations voting "yes" represented states with 33% of free people, "no" 37%, and non-votes 30%. The fact that the Senate was created by a minority of the population was obvious to the Founders: James Wilson argued: "Our Constituents, had they voted as their representatives did, would have stood as 2/3 against the equality, and 1/3 only in favor of it." Similarly, James Madison noted: "We are driven to an unhappy dilemma. Two thirds of the inhabitants of the union are to please the remaining one third by sacrificing their essential rights.".

=== 1780s-1880s: Doldrums of reform ===
Originally, senators were selected by the state legislatures, not by popular elections. This was unpopular but slow to change. Calls for a constitutional amendment regarding Senate elections started in the early 19th century, with Henry R. Storrs in 1826 proposing an amendment to provide for popular election. Similar amendments were introduced in 1829 and 1855, with the "most prominent" proponent being Andrew Johnson, who raised the issue in 1868 and considered the idea's merits "so palpable" that no additional explanation was necessary.

In the 1860s, there was a major congressional dispute over the issue, with the House and Senate voting to veto the appointment of John P. Stockton to the Senate due to his approval by a plurality of the New Jersey Legislature rather than a majority. In reaction, the Congress passed a bill in July 1866 that required state legislatures to elect senators by an absolute majority.

In April 1876, US House member Sobieski Ross introduced petitions for two constitutional amendments, one supporting "abolition of the presidency" and the other "abolition of the United States Senate." Neither advanced from committee.

=== 1890s-1913: Movement for direct election of the Senate ===
By the 1890s, support for the introduction of direct election for the Senate had substantially increased. The Populist Party incorporated the direct election of senators into its Omaha Platform, adopted in 1892. In 1908, Oregon passed the first law basing the selection of U.S. senators on a popular vote. Oregon was soon followed by Nebraska. Proponents for popular election noted that ten states already had non-binding primaries for Senate candidates, in which the candidates would be voted on by the public, effectively serving as advisory referendums instructing state legislatures how to vote. Reformers campaigned for more states to introduce a similar method. By 1912, the legislatures of 29 states had enacted popular election of senators via referendums.

In April 1911, US House member Victor Berger introduced a constitutional amendment that would abolish the Senate, eliminate the Presidential veto, and restrict judicial review. Berger's proposal was motivated in part by a series of corruption scandals in state legislatures, which still elected most Senators. The amendment did not advance from committee. Instead, in 1912, Congress passed the Seventeenth Amendment, which mandated popular election of Senators. In 1913, the states ratified the Seventeenth Amendment, thus standardizing direct election to the Senate nationwide. which required popular election while leaving the equal representation of states unchanged.

=== 1960s: Warren Court decisions ===
In Wesberry v. Sanders (1964), the Supreme Court extended the principle of "one person, one vote" to all U.S. congressional districts, ruling that Congressional districts must be approximately equal in population, because unequal representation is an unconstitutional violation of the Equal Protection Clause. In Davis v. Mann and Reynolds v. Sims (1964), the Court extended "one person, one vote" to state legislature districts as well, ruling that both state lower chamber and state upper chamber districts must be approximately equal in population. (Before the ruling, many state legislature districts had massive population imbalances, such as a district in the New Hampshire House of Representatives with just 3 people, or a 225-to-1 ratio between the largest and smallest Nevada Senate districts.) Writing for the majority, Chief Justice Earl Warren said: "Legislators represent people, not trees or acres. Legislators are elected by voters, not farms or cities or economic interests." In addition, the majority simply denied the argument that states were permitted to mirror their apportionment structure on the United States Senate, which requires two Senators per state regardless of population. The Supreme Court summarized the District Court's argument that "counties are merely involuntary political units of the State created by statute to aid in the administration of state government".

Davis v. Mann and Reynolds v. Sims set off a wave of redistricting around the country. The decisions also inspired some political backlash from those who wished to defend rural voters against city voters. Senator Everett Dirksen of Illinois supported a constitutional amendment that would allow legislative districts similar to the United States Senate (such as 1 senator per county). Dirksen claimed that each state would now be dominated by its large cities: "[T]he forces of our national life are not brought to bear on public questions solely in proportion to the weight of numbers. If they were, the 6 million citizens of the Chicago area would hold sway in the Illinois Legislature without consideration of the problems of their 4 million fellows who are scattered in 100 other counties. Under the Court's new decree, California could be dominated by Los Angeles and San Francisco; Michigan by Detroit." In contrast, in a 2015 Time survey of 50 law professors, many cited Reynolds v. Sims as the best Supreme Court decision since 1960, with Erwin Chemerinsky saying it made American government "far more democratic and representative".

=== 1990s-present: Renewed interest in reform ===
Interest in reforming or abolishing the Senate rose again since the 1990s. The legislative gridlock from the filibuster and razor-thin partisan margins in the Senate have highlighted the chamber for reform. In 1995, Senator Daniel Patrick Moynihan said: "Sometime in the next century the United States is going to have to address the question of apportionment in the Senate".

Reform proposals from Republicans have focused on repealing the Seventeenth Amendment and ending the popular election of Senators, returning the Senate to a body appointed by state legislatures. In the early 2010s, US House members Pete Hoekstra, Todd Akin, Richard Mourdock, and Mike Lee argued for repealing the Seventeenth Amendment entirely, arguing that direct election of Senators weakens states' rights. In 2016, the Utah legislature approved Senate Joint Resolution No. 2, in favor of a constitutional amendment to repeal the Seventeenth Amendment. In 2017, former Arkansas governor Mike Huckabee endorsed the repeal of the Seventeenth Amendment, arguing that senators chosen by state legislatures would "work for their states and respect [the Tenth Amendment]" while direct election of Senators caused the "swamp". In September 2020, Nebraska Senator Ben Sasse endorsed the repeal of the Seventeenth Amendment, which he said would "Make the Senate Great Again". In 2026, US House member Keith Self introduced a constitutional amendment to repeal the Seventeenth Amendment, co-sponsored by eight other House Republicans: Eric Burlison, Andrew Clyde, Paul Gosar, Andy Harris, Scott Perry, Clay Higgins, Sheri Biggs, and Michael Cloud.

Reform proposals from Democrats have focused on making the Senate more representative or reducing its power. In 2018, US House member John Dingell, then the longest-serving House member, named two reforms necessary to win back public trust in Congress: "Abolish the Senate and publicly fund elections." Dingell argues that the Senate violates "one man, one vote", is therefore "downright dangerous", and should be abolished. In 2023, US House member Sean Casten proposed a constitutional amendment that would add 12 new Senators, elected via ranked-choice voting in an at-large district (from the entire electorate, including non-states such as the District of Columbia).

== Arguments for and against reform ==
=== One person, one vote ===
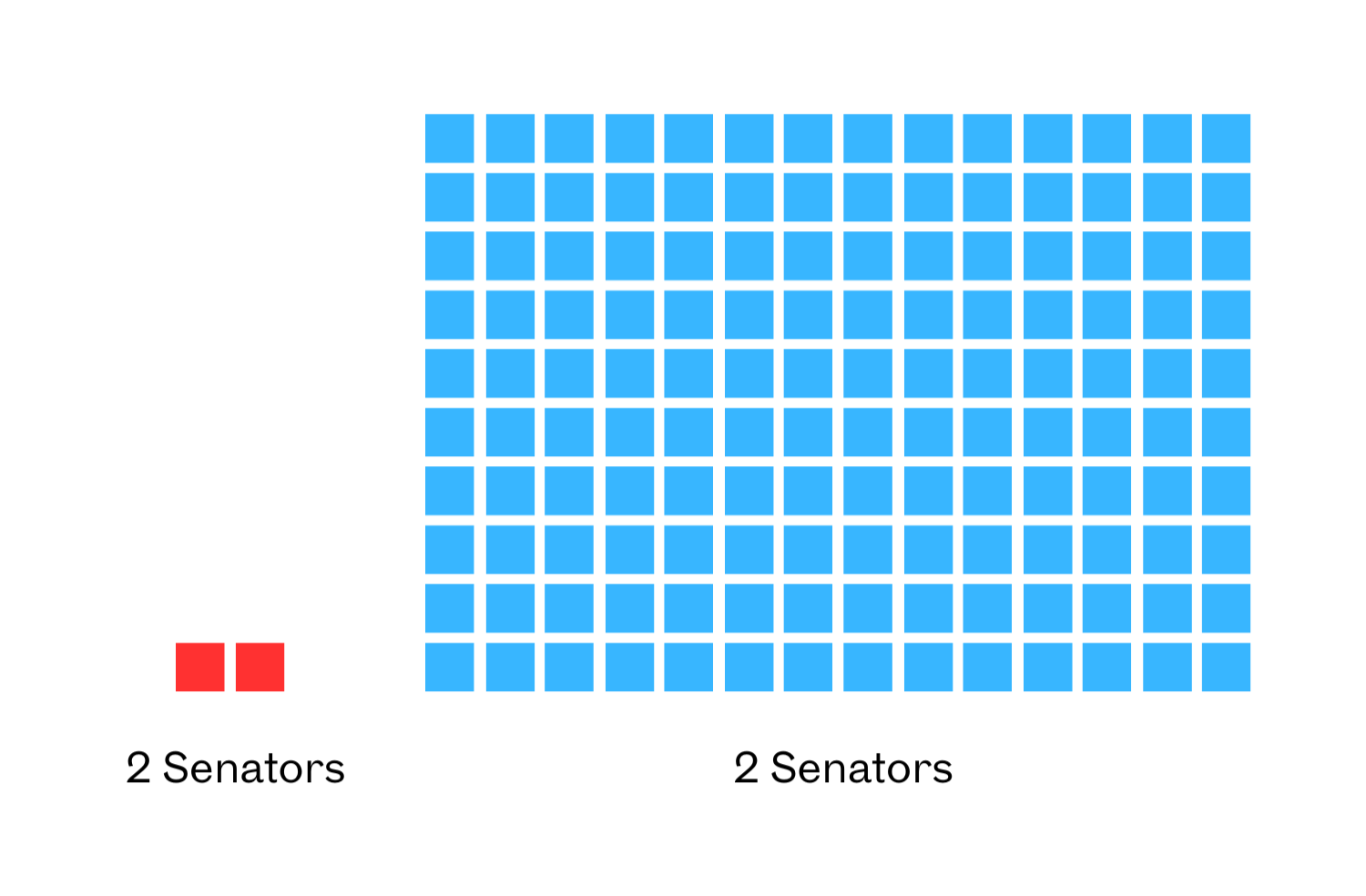
Despite a 1:70 ratio of Wyoming to California voters as of 2020, both states are guaranteed two senators.

The Senate's structure gives states with smaller populations the same number of senators (two) as states with much larger populations. This apportionment scheme yields a substantial advantage for small-population states. The malapportionment (disparity in representation between the most and least populous states) has grown over time: In 1790, Virginia had 10 times the population of Rhode Island. In 2020, California had 70 times the population of Wyoming.

Modern academic criticism has revived the founding-era argument that democratic representation should be based on people rather than states. Political scientist Robert Dahl wrote of the Senate, "the degree of unequal representation in the U.S. Senate is by far the most extreme [and a] profound violation of the democratic idea of political equality among citizens." Historian Daniel Wirls contends that this structure makes the Senate "non-democratic".

Harvard professors Steven Levitsky and Daniel Ziblatt argue that, due to malapportionment, the Senate is America's most undemocratic institution. In an international comparison of all countries with an upper chamber, they found that just two (Argentina and Brazil) deviate further from the one person, one vote principle than the U.S. Senate. By the beginning of the 21st century, two-thirds of legislatures globally had become unicameral, with the remaining upper houses tending to become more representative or less powerful; in contrast, the U.S. Senate remained an outlier by not following what Ziblatt and Levitsky refer to as a democratizing trend.

=== Corruption and waste ===
In Sizing Up the Senate (1999), political scientists Frances E. Lee and Bruce I. Oppenheimer argue that, compared with large-state senators, small-state senators are much more likely to engage in pork barrel politics; much more likely to have leadership positions; and that this results in substantially more money per capita spent by the federal government in block grants to small states than large states. Elizabeth Rusch and Daniel Lazare argue that the Senate's structure gives voters from small states disproportionate influence and allows them to benefit from disproportionate amounts of federal funding when compared to voters from larger states.

=== Political bias ===
Political scientists Richard Johnson and Lisa L. Miller devised a formula that reweighted senators' roll-call votes to reflect differences in state population while retaining a minimum advantage for small states. Applying the formula to 804 key Senate votes from 1961 through 2019, they found that more than 17 percent of the outcomes would have changed.

Ian Millhiser shows that this malapportionment has repeatedly led to the party with more votes losing control of the Senate (and as a result, the Supreme Court). This bias currently favors the Republican Party, but previously strongly favored the Democratic Party.

=== Tyranny of the majority ===
Senator Mitch McConnell argued that the Senate's structure prevents tyranny of the majority, saying: "[E]qual representation in the Senate was designed to protect the interest of states", but "in designing it that way, the Framers also protected the minority". McConnell cited the 1965 Civil Rights Act as an example. In contrast, Historian Daniel Wirls argues that checks and balances limit tyranny of the majority, while the Senate's apportionment system was never designed to do so. Wirls argues that the "biggest contradiction between the Senate’s self-image and their actual history" is that "in many very important cases, their main role was thwarting" the "passage of even moderate legislation" to protect the civil rights of ethnic and other minorities.

=== Federalism ===
Yale legal scholar Akhil Reed Amar argues that the Senate's structure is integral to the federal system, ensuring that smaller states have a voice in the democratic process, though he also supports reforms to decrease the bias toward small states.

== Reform proposals ==
=== Abolition ===
Proposals for a unicameral national legislature would abolish the Senate entirely and transfer all of its powers to the House of Representatives.

=== Reformed powers ===
The Senate has five substantial powers in the Constitution:

1. To pass an Act of Congress (alongside the House), under Article I, Section 7
2. To propose a Constitutional amendment, under Article V
3. To try federal impeachments, under Article I, Section 3, Clause 6
4. To provide advice and consent on treaties, under the Treaty Clause
5. To confirm certain federal positions, under the Appointments Clause

A constitutional amendment could transfer any of these powers to the United States House of Representatives. If the Senate were reformed but not abolished, this process might mirror the United Kingdom Parliament Act 1911, which removed the ability of the House of Lords to block House of Commons legislation, instead giving the Lords a "suspensory veto".

Law professor Garrett Epps supports this reform and argues that the Senate could be made a consultative body via constitutional amendment alone, without violating the Article V "Entrenchment Clause". Similarly, when Democracy: A Journal of Ideas editor Michael Tomasky convened a symposium of legal scholars to draft a proposed New Constitution of the United States in 2021, they suggested a consultative Senate with the power to delay legislation from the House.

=== Reformed apportionment ===
==== Popular representation ====
Degressive proportionality provides a minimum number of delegates to each political division (such as 1 each or 2 each), then adds additional delegates for more-populous divisions. These reform proposals attempt to retain the Senate, with most or all of its powers intact, while approximating true proportional representation:

- Political scientist Larry Sabato proposed a 135-member chamber, which would give 2 extra senators to the 10 most populous states and 1 extra senator to the next 15.
- Geographer Benjamin Forest proposed a "seven-seven" adjustment, which would give 3 extra senators to the 7 largest states, and just 1 senator total for each of the 7 smallest states.
- Legal scholar Akhil Reed Amar proposed a degressively proportional allocation with at least 1 senator per state and a cap of 8 senators for the largest state.
- Legal scholar Eric Orts proposed a roughly 110-seat, degressively proportional chamber, which would provide each state with at least 1 senator, and distribute the remaining 60 by population each decennial census.

==== At-Large senators ====
The Article V "Entrenchment Clause" prohibits any constitutional amendment which would deprive any State "of its equal Suffrage in the Senate" without consent from that State. Legal scholars David Froomkin and Michael Froomkin consider many reforms which yield a popular-apportionment Senate which do not violate this requirement. They suggest a Constitutional amendment to add 400 at-large Senators elected via proportional representation, and write:

Critics of this proposal may raise the functionalist objection that the addition of at-large senators would in effect increase the representation of citizens of the larger states, who will come to have more influence in the Senate because of the change. But the Entrenchment Clause pertains to the representation of states rather than to the representation of people within states. (Indeed, it originated in an era prior to the direct election of senators.)

Sean Casten's proposal similarly suggests adding 12 new Senators, elected via ranked-choice voting in a single at-large district for the entire country. Political scientist Todd Tucker instead suggests adding eight new Senators for non-state territories: Two for DC, two from all Atlantic territories (including Puerto Rico), two from all Pacific territories, and two from Native American tribes as a whole.

==== Weighted votes ====
Votes in the Senate could be weighted by state population, thus giving each state two senators, but giving small states no extra power over large states. No concrete proposal has yet suggested this reform. However, law professor Burt Neuborne argues that the Seventeenth Amendment to the United States Constitution, which states "each Senator shall have one vote", makes any vote weighting unconstitutional.

== Opinion polling ==
In January-February 2018, a Pew Research Center survey of 1,155 adults found that 24% said the Constitution should be amended so that "states with larger populations have more senators than smaller states", while 75% favored "two senators regardless of the size of their population". Support was 14% among Republicans and Republican leaners and 31% among Democrats and Democratic leaners. In another sample of 1,172 adults, with an experimental version of the question that first informed respondents that the population ratio between the largest and smallest states had increased from 10-to-1 at the country's founding to 66-to-1, support rose to 29% and opposition dropped to 68%. Support was 16% among Rep/lean Rep and 39% among Dem/lean Dem.

In November 2021, a YouGov survey of 2,750 adults found that 36% preferred to "change the US Senate so that states with more people would have more senators" while 64% preferred to "keep the current system in which every state has two senators". Support for change was 17% among Republicans, 25% among Independents, and 56% among Democrats. In a parallel survey of 564 political scientists, 72% favored population-based representation.

In July 2022, an Echelon Insights survey of 1,022 likely voters found that 13% said the Senate "should be abolished", while 62% said it should "not be abolished", and 19% were unsure. Support for abolition was 7% among Republicans, 11% among Independents, and 17% among Democrats. Support for abolition was 19% among people under 50 and 9% among people above 50. In the same survey, 24% said the Constitution should be amended so that "states with larger populations have more senators than smaller states", while 66% favored "two senators regardless of the size of their population", and 14% were unsure. Support was 12% among Republicans, 20% among Independents, and 37% among Democrats. Support was 30% among people under 50 and 21% among people over 50.

In July 2023, a Pew survey of 4,247 adults found that 32% said the Constitution should be amended so that "states with larger populations have more senators than smaller states", while 66% favored "two senators regardless of the size of their population". Support was 45% among people under 30 and 18% among above 65. Support was 19% among Rep/lean Rep and 45% among Dem/lean Dem.

== See also ==
- Proportional representation in the United States
- Unicameralism#Unicameralism in the United States
- Seventeenth Amendment to the United States Constitution
- Reforms in other countries:
  - Parliament Acts 1911 and 1949 and Reform of the House of Lords
  - Canadian Senate reform
  - List of abolished upper houses
- Other reforms:
  - Supreme Court reform in the United States
  - Efforts to reform the United States Electoral College
  - Filibuster in the United States Senate#Proposals for reform
