= Efforts to reform the United States Electoral College =

Attempts to change the way the U.S. president and vice president are elected

The Electoral College is an informal name for the U.S. Constitutional system for selecting the president. The electoral system was a compromise added by the constitutional framers on Committee on Postponed Matters after the convention could not agree whether the House or Senate would take the lead role in electing the president of the United States. The institution has been criticized since its establishment and a number of efforts have been made to reform the way it works or abolish it. Any change would require a constitutional amendment. In 1971, one of these attempts was almost successful in being proposed to the States. An interstate compact proposal, which would bypass the requirement for a constitutional amendment, is at 82%(222/270 EV’s) successful completion as of May 2026.

== Background ==
The Electoral College was established by Article II, Section 1 of the United States Constitution in 1789, as a group of people independent of the government to vote on who should become president in the nation's quadrennial presidential elections. They cast legally binding votes which, since 1876, have been based on polling taken in each of the states and Washington, D.C.

Since 1800, over 700 proposals to reform or eliminate the system have been introduced in Congress. Proponents of these proposals argued that the electoral college system does not provide for direct democratic election, affords less-populous states an advantage, and allows a candidate to win the presidency without winning the most votes. None of these proposals have received the approval of two-thirds of Congress and three-fourths of the states required to amend the Constitution.

The Electoral College process consists of the selection of the electors, the meeting of the electors where they vote for the President and the Vice President, and the counting of the electoral votes by Congress. The college has 538 electors. A majority of 270 electoral votes is required to elect the President.

== Criticisms ==
=== Popular and electoral vote ===
Deciding the president by electoral vote (instead of directly by popular vote) means that the candidate who loses the popular vote can still win the election. That is subject to major criticisms in recent years, especially after the 2016 election in which Hillary Clinton received 2.87 million more popular votes than Donald Trump, (a margin of 2%) while Trump received 304 electoral votes and Clinton 227, a margin of 34%.

=== Faithless electors ===
Electors are expected to cast their votes in the state in favor of the candidate for which they pledged. When an elector votes for a different candidate then they originally pledged for, they are then called faithless electors. While there is no federal law requiring electors to vote according to a state's popular vote, some states have put in place sanctions on electors who do not. The legality of these sanctions was upheld in 2020 by the U.S. Supreme Court in Chiafalo v. Washington.

At the 2016 presidential election, two faithless electors defected from Trump and five defected from Clinton.

=== Distribution of electoral votes ===
The Electoral College allocates votes by giving each state two electoral votes, and then dividing the remaining votes among the states based on their populations. The two votes being automatically allocated has allowed for disproportional representation of where people live in favor of the smaller states. For instance, California has an estimated 718,404 inhabitants per electoral vote, whereas Wyoming has 192,920 per vote. (Note: Each state has a number of votes in the Electoral College equal to two more than its number of representatives in the U.S. House, while DC is granted 3 electoral votes. The number of inhabitants per state is calculated as inhabitants divided by electoral votes.)

=== First-past-the-post system ===
The Electoral College employs a first-past-the-post voting system in which a candidate who receives the most electoral votes wins. When candidates have high support levels in states with smaller populations and lower support level in more populous ones, such as in the 2016 election, this can have a consequence in which the winner of the national popular vote can lose the electoral vote and not be elected president.

Winners of the popular vote in each state's elections are usually awarded all of the electoral votes in that state, but there is no legal requirement for a state to use a first-past-the-post system. As of 2020, 48 states do; but electors in Nebraska and Maine divide their electoral votes according to their congressional districts. In these 2 states, a candidate might not carry the state overall, but might pick up electoral college votes if they carry individual districts. Maine adopted this system in 1972 and Nebraska in 1996. However, there have only been select occasions (all since 2008) in which the winner of the state did not win all districts in that state. In 2008 in Nebraska, Republican candidate John McCain won Nebraska's 1st and 3rd districts, whereas Democratic candidate Barack Obama, who would go on to win the national election, won the 2nd district. In the 2016 election, Hillary Clinton won Maine's 1st congressional district, whereas Republican candidate Donald Trump, who went on to win the national election, won the 2nd district. In the 2020 election, Democratic candidate Joe Biden, who went on to win the national election, won Maine's 1st district and Republican candidate Donald Trump won Maine's 2nd district. Also in the 2020 election, Joe Biden won Nebraska's 2nd district, whereas Donald Trump won Nebraska's 1st and 3rd districts.

== Efforts to reform ==
=== District Plan Amendments ===
There were several attempts in the early 1800s to require states to divide their electoral votes into single vote districts instead of at large. Districts within a state would vote for only one elector, allowing states to split their votes between different candidates. Reformers hoped this would decrease the number of safe states by allowing minority parties to win districts within a state, decrease the role of swing states, and decrease the chance of the winning candidate losing the popular vote.

Many members of the constitutional convention assumed states would choose electors by district instead of at large. One advocate for the amendments, James Madison, wrote in 1823 that the district plan "was mostly, if not exclusively, in view when the Constitution was framed and adopted." Between 1813 and 1824 the Senate approved amendments for the district plan four different times, and the House approved a separate amendment in 1820. None of the amendments managed to pass both houses.

2 out of the 50 states, Maine and Nebraska, use this method of choosing electors. As of 2024, each state had split its votes three times. The CDM allocates one electoral vote to each congressional district while the remaining two votes are distributed to the state-wide winner. This method has been argued to reduce the winner-take-all controversies and offer a better regional political diversity.

=== Lodge-Gossett Amendment ===
Introduced in 1950 and named after its sponsors senator Henry Lodge (R-Massachusetts) and representative Ed Gossett (D-Texas), the Lodge-Gossett Amendment was a plan to allocate the electoral votes proportional to the popular vote. The amendment would have kept the states' electoral votes but eliminated electors. Instead, in each state, the electoral votes would have been allocated in proportion to each candidate's share of the popular vote in that state. There would also have been a nationwide electoral threshold of 40 percent of electoral votes, with a joint session of Congress acting as tie-breaker between the two top candidates in case none crossed the threshold. The amendment passed in the Senate, with a super majority of 64–27, but failed to pass in the House of Representatives.

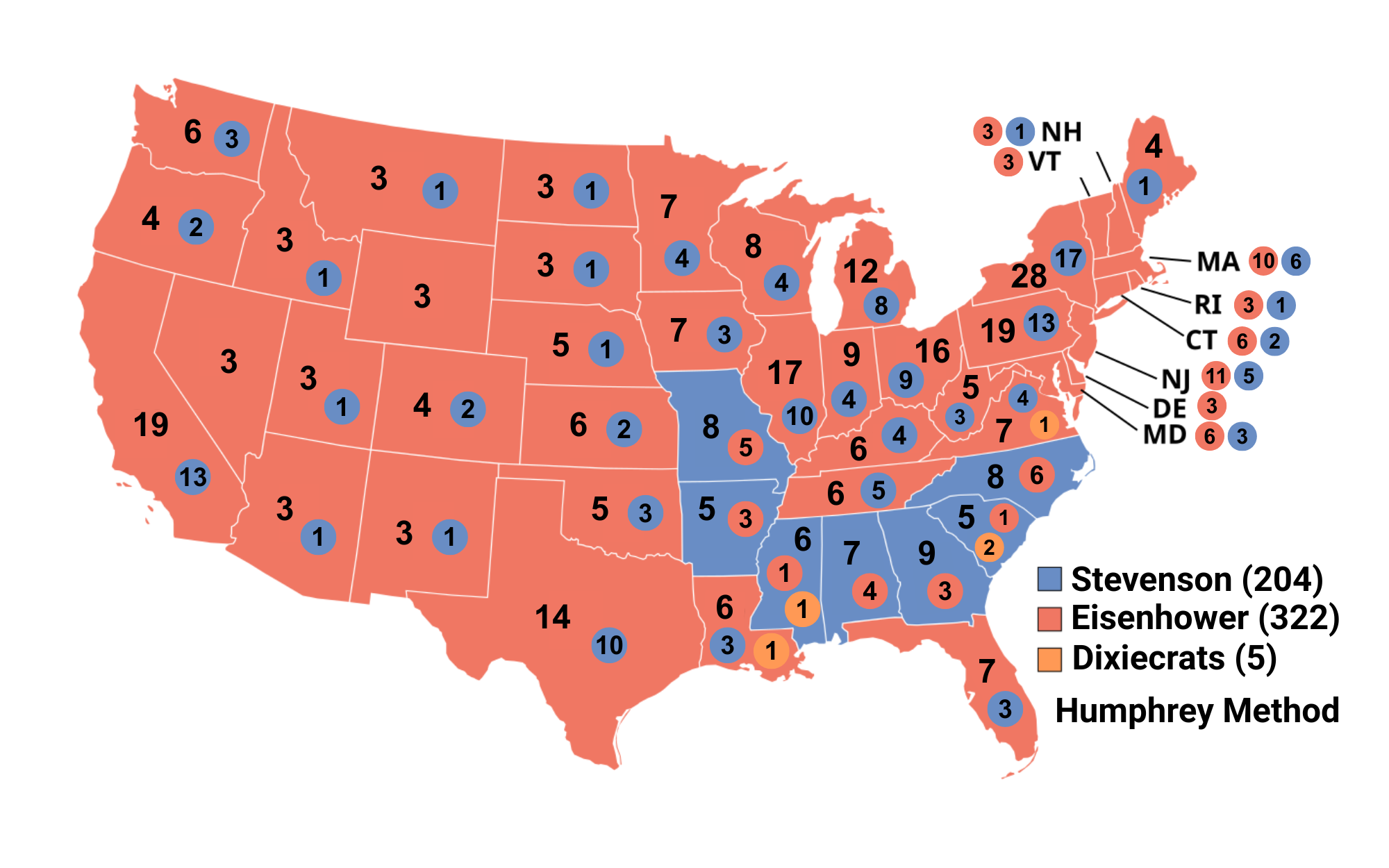
If Humphrey's method were applied to the 1956 election, it would have given Stevenson 130 more EVs (204 total), resulting in him receiving 38% of the total.

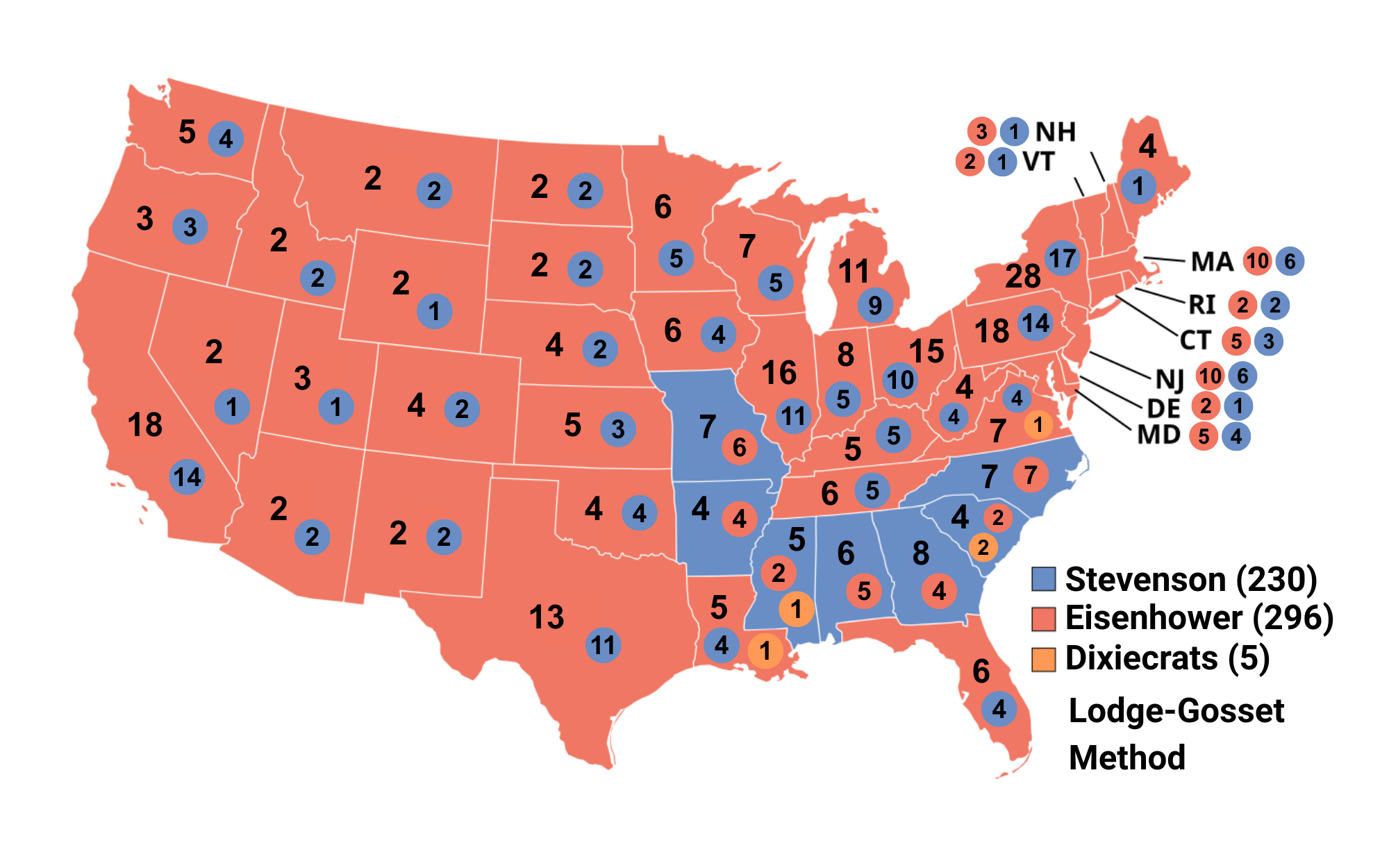
Since the Lodge-Gosset method did not award 2 EVs for statewide winners, smaller states (such as the Dakotas) would allocate more votes for non-statewide winners.

=== Hubert Humphrey's 1956 proposal ===
Senator Hubert Humphrey in 1956 proposed a compromise where electoral college votes would have been distributed based both on state pluralities and the national popular vote. Two electoral college votes would have been awarded to the candidate with the plurality of the popular vote in each state, and the remaining electoral votes would then have been divided in proportion to each candidate's share of the national popular vote. This proposal, put forward as Senate Joint Resolution 152 in March 1956, passed the Senate but not the House of Representatives.

=== Delaware v. New York ===
The state of Delaware in 1966 sought to file a complaint in the U.S. Supreme Court against all other states and the District of Columbia, arguing that the winner-take-all practice of awarding all of a state's electors to one candidate in effect deprived the minority voters of their vote. Delaware argued that the system had spread nationwide because of a kind of arms race where each state wanted to maximize its electoral impact in response to other states adopting the winner-take-all system, and that since the system favored entrenched interests, only the Supreme Court could offer relief. Twelve other states subsequently joined Delaware in the complaint. The Supreme Court summarily refused to hear the case, leaving the question of how to interpret the unexplained denial in doubt.

=== Bayh–Celler Amendment ===
The closest the United States has come to abolishing the Electoral College occurred during the 91st Congress (1969–1971). The presidential election of 1968 resulted in Richard Nixon receiving 301 electoral votes (56% of electors), Hubert Humphrey 191 (35.5%), and George Wallace 46 (8.5%) with 13.5% of the popular vote. However, Nixon had received only 511,944 more popular votes than Humphrey, 43.5% to 42.9%, less than 1% of the national total.

Representative Emanuel Celler (D–New York), chairman of the House Judiciary Committee, responded to public concerns over the disparity between the popular vote and electoral vote by introducing House Joint Resolution 681, a proposed Constitutional amendment that would have replaced the Electoral College with a simpler plurality system based on the national popular vote. With this system, the pair of candidates who had received the highest number of votes would win the presidency and vice presidency provided they won at least 40% of the national popular vote. If no pair received 40% of the popular vote, a runoff election would be held in which the choice of president and vice president would be made from the two pairs of persons who had received the highest number of votes in the first election. The word "pair" was defined as "two persons who shall have consented to the joining of their names as candidates for the offices of president and vice president."

On April 29, 1969, the House Judiciary Committee voted 28 to 6 to approve the proposal. Debate on the proposal before the full House of Representatives ended on September 11, 1969 and was eventually passed with bipartisan support on September 18, 1969, by a vote of 339 to 70.

On September 30, 1969, President Richard Nixon gave his endorsement for adoption of the proposal, encouraging the Senate to pass its version of the proposal, which had been sponsored as Senate Joint Resolution 1 by Senator Birch Bayh (D–Indiana).

On October 8, 1969, the New York Times reported that 30 state legislatures were "either certain or likely to approve a constitutional amendment embodying the direct election plan if it passes its final Congressional test in the Senate." Ratification of 38 state legislatures would have been needed for adoption. The paper also reported that six other states had yet to state a preference, six were leaning toward opposition, and eight were solidly opposed.

On August 14, 1970, the Senate Judiciary Committee sent its report advocating passage of the proposal to the full Senate. The Judiciary Committee had approved the proposal by a vote of 11 to 6. The six members who opposed the plan, Democratic senators James Eastland of Mississippi, John Little McClellan of Arkansas, and Sam Ervin of North Carolina, along with Republican senators Roman Hruska of Nebraska, Hiram Fong of Hawaii, and Strom Thurmond of South Carolina, all argued that although the present system had potential loopholes, it had worked well throughout the years. Senator Bayh indicated that supporters of the measure were about a dozen votes shy from the 67 needed for the proposal to pass the full Senate. He called upon President Nixon to attempt to persuade undecided Republican senators to support the proposal. However, Nixon, while not reneging on his previous endorsement, chose not to make any further personal appeals to back the proposal.

On September 8, 1970, the Senate commenced openly debating the proposal, and the proposal was quickly filibustered. The lead objectors to the proposal were mostly Southern senators and conservatives from small states, both Democrats and Republicans, who argued that abolishing the Electoral College would reduce their states' political influence. On September 17, 1970, a motion for cloture, which would have ended the filibuster, received 54 votes to 36 for cloture, failing to receive the then-required two-thirds majority of senators voting. A second motion for cloture on September 29, 1970, also failed, by 53 to 34. Thereafter, the Senate majority leader, Mike Mansfield of Montana, moved to lay the proposal aside so the Senate could attend to other business. However, the proposal was never considered again and died when the 91st Congress ended on January 3, 1971.

=== Carter proposal ===
On March 22, 1977, President Jimmy Carter wrote a letter of reform to Congress that also included his expression of essentially abolishing the Electoral College. The letter read in part:

My fourth recommendation is that the Congress adopt a Constitutional amendment to provide for direct popular election of the President. Such an amendment, which would abolish the Electoral College, will ensure that the candidate chosen by the voters actually becomes President. Under the Electoral College, it is always possible that the winner of the popular vote will not be elected. This has already happened in three elections, 1824, 1876, and 1888. In the last election, the result could have been changed by a small shift of votes in Ohio and Hawaii, despite a popular vote difference of 1.7 million. I do not recommend a Constitutional amendment lightly. I think the amendment process must be reserved for an issue of overriding governmental significance. But the method by which we elect our President is such an issue. I will not be proposing a specific direct election amendment. I prefer to allow the Congress to proceed with its work without the interruption of a new proposal.

President Carter's proposed program for the reform of the Electoral College was very liberal for a modern president during this time, and in some aspects of the package, it went beyond original expectations. Newspapers like The New York Times saw President Carter's proposal at that time as "a modest surprise" because of the indication of Carter that he would be interested in only eliminating the electors but retaining the electoral vote system in a modified form.

Newspaper reaction to Carter's proposal ranged from some editorials praising the proposal to other editorials, like that in the Chicago Tribune, criticizing the president for proposing the end of the Electoral College.

In a letter to The New York Times, Representative Jonathan B. Bingham (D-New York) highlighted the danger of the "flawed, outdated mechanism of the Electoral College" by underscoring how a shift of fewer than 10,000 votes in two key states would have led to President Gerald Ford being reelected despite Jimmy Carter's nationwide 1.7 million-vote margin.

The Senate took up the debate on a constitutional amendment in 1977. In 1979, it was defeated by a Senate filibuster.

=== Electoral Count Reform and Presidential Transition Improvement Act of 2022 ===
In December 2022, Congress passed and the president signed the Electoral Count Reform and Presidential Transition Improvement Act. This modernized the Electoral Count Act of 1887 significantly. The legislation streamlines which state officials may submit a slate of electors and enhances legal clarity on the certification process. The bill emphasizes that the choice of state electors must be in line with state laws prior to election day. This overall aims to reduce the risk of competing outcomes.

Despite these changes many argue that flaws remain in the system. For example, the Act does not fully solve the possibility of litigation over alternate electors, and some claim that further reforms could better protect against attempts to overthrow the election via procedural objections or misalignment between state and federal laws.

=== Ranked Choice Voting ===
Ranked choice voting (RCV) allows voters to rank their candidates in order of preference and some argue it offers and more democratic representation in elections. RCV has been adopted in a mix of 52 U.S. cities, counties, and states since 2000 . If adopted by states in presidential elections, it could help ensure candidates receive an absolute majority of a state's popular vote (rather than a plurality) in order to win that state's electors.

=== Proportional Representation ===
Proportional representation refers to electoral systems in which political parties/candidates receive or share electoral votes that reflect their popular vote. If adopted alongside the electoral college system, for example, a presidential candidate who won 40% of a state's popular vote would receive approximately 40% of that state's electoral votes. Supporters of proportional representation argue that this method would more accurately represent voter preferences in each state during elections. It is also cited as a way to reform the college without having to implement a constitutional amendment. However, critics argue that this system could increase the likelihood that no candidate would secure an absolute majority of electoral votes which would technically shift presidential elections to the House of Representatives under the Twelfth Amendment.

=== Proposals to abolish ===
Bills have been made proposing constitutional amendments that would replace the Electoral College with the popular election of the president and vice president. Unlike the Bayh–Celler amendment, with its 40% threshold for election, these proposals do not require a candidate to achieve a certain percentage of votes to be elected.

==== H.Con.Res.79 — 115th Congress ====
On September 14, 2017, Congressman Steve Cohen introduced a concurrent resolution asking that the sense of Congress be expressed that: (1) Congress and the states should consider a constitutional amendment to reform the Electoral College and establish a process for electing the President and Vice President by a national popular vote, and (2) Congress should encourage the states to continue to reform the Electoral College process through such steps as the formation of an interstate compact to award the majority of Electoral College votes to the national popular vote winner. On March 14, 2017, Congressman Jerry Nadler asked unanimous consent that he be considered as the first sponsor of the bill.

== National Popular Vote Interstate Compact ==
Several states plus the District of Columbia have joined the National Popular Vote Interstate Compact. Those jurisdictions joining the compact agree to eventually pledge their electors to the winner of the national popular vote. The compact will not go into effect until the number of states agreeing to the compact form a majority (at least 270) of all electors. The compact is based on the current rule in Article II, Section 1, Clause 2 of the Constitution, which gives each state legislature the plenary power to determine how it chooses its electors.

Some scholars have suggested that Article I, Section 10, Clause 3 of the Constitution requires congressional consent before the compact could be enforceable; thus, any attempted implementation of the compact without congressional consent could face court challenges to its constitutionality. Others have suggested that the compact's legality was strengthened by Chiafalo v. Washington, in which the Supreme Court upheld the power of states to enforce electors' pledges.

As of 2026, 18 states and the District of Columbia have joined the compact; collectively, these jurisdictions control 222 electoral votes, which is 82.2% of the 270 required for the compact to take effect.

== See also ==
- Other reforms:
  - Reform of the United States Senate
  - Supreme Court reform in the United States
