= Counter-majoritarian difficulty =

Perceived problem with judicial review

The counter-majoritarian difficulty (sometimes counter-majoritarian dilemma) is a perceived problem with judicial review of legislative (or popularly-created) laws. As the term suggests, some oppose or see a problem with the judicial branch's ability to invalidate, overrule, or countermand laws that reflect the will of the majority.

The counter-majoritarian difficulty is often raised in discussions of United States constitutional law, particularly to discuss the relationship between federalism and fundamental rights.

== Origins ==
Alexander Bickel, a law professor at Yale Law School, coined the term counter-majoritarian difficulty in his 1962 book, The Least Dangerous Branch. He used the term to describe the argument that judicial review is illegitimate because it allows unelected judges to overrule the lawmaking of elected representatives and thus to undermine the will of the majority. The problem stems from the understanding that a democracy's legitimacy arises from the fact that it implements the will of the majority (majoritarianism).

== Responses ==
Majoritarianism is based on the view that a democracy can be defined by only its procedural aspects. However, the definition of democracy is contentious. The argument is often made that substantive rights must be protected in a democracy to truly have a democracy, even when those undermine the majoritarian nature of the democracy. Under this view, when judges enforce such substantive rights, such as those agreed upon in a constitution, the judges are actually engaged in furthering democracy.

Political theorists have also argued that in some cases, elected representatives pass laws that do not reflect the will of the people, and in those cases, judicial review is a valid means by which to correct the democratic process.

On the other hand, in 2008, Judge John E. Jones III, a Republican serving on the United States District Court for the Middle District of Pennsylvania, stated that Article Three of the United States Constitution "is counter-majoritarian," adding: "The judicial branch protects against the tyranny of the majority. We are a bulwark against public opinion. And that was very much done with a purpose, and I think that it really has withstood the test of time. The judiciary is a check against the unconstitutional abuse and extension of power by the other branches of government." Judge Jones is the author of the landmark decision Kitzmiller v. Dover Area School District, which found intelligent design to be a form of creationism that may not be taught in public school science classes under the Establishment Clause of the First Amendment and separation of church and state established by the Founding Fathers of the United States.

== See also ==
- Judicial interpretation – Ways courts interpret laws, especially Constitutional laws
- Judicial activism – Controversial judicial practice
- Separation of powers – Division of a state's government into branches
- Supreme Court Reform in the United States

== Notes and references ==
- Political Ignorance and the Counter-majoritarian Difficulty: A New Perspective on the “Central Obsession” of Constitutional Law
- "The Counter-Majoritarian Difficulty", Legal Theory Blog.
- Gabriel J. Chin & Randy Wagner, The Tyranny of the Minority: Jim Crow and the Counter-Majoritarian Difficulty, 43 Harvard Civil Rights-Civil Liberties Law Review 65 (2008)
