= Henry M. Hart Jr. =

American legal scholar (1904–1969)

- Born: 1904; Butte, Montana, U.S.
- Died: 1969 (aged 64–65)
- Education: Harvard University (AB, LLB, LLM, SJD)
- Occupations: Law professor; author

Henry Melvin Hart Jr. (1904–1969) was an American legal scholar. He was an influential member of the Harvard Law School faculty from 1932 until his death in 1969.

== Early life and career ==
Born in Butte, Montana, Hart received his A.B. from Harvard College in 1926 and attended Harvard Law School, where he was president of the Harvard Law Review and received an LL.M. in 1930 and an S.J.D. in 1931. Following work for then-Professor Felix Frankfurter, Hart clerked for Supreme Court Justice Louis Brandeis and then returned to Harvard Law School, where he was a fixture until his death at 64. An "ardent supporter of the New Deal" and of President Franklin D. Roosevelt, World War II and the Cold War led Hart to evolve "from a dedicated progressive into a theorist of social stability, cultural consensus, and institutional balance." That evolution led Hart to seek institutional solutions to protect the rule of law from overreaching by Congress and the executive. That approach became the inspiration for the new "Legal Process" school of American jurisprudence.

== Important works and key principles ==
=== Legal process ===
The legal process school was first given definition by Hart's manuscript of the same name, co-authored with Albert M. Sacks. Originally planned for publication by Foundation Press in 1956, the manuscript was organized into seven chapters, with 55 "problems" which guided the student through Hart and Sacks proposed approach to important American law cases. Despite being widely circulated in manuscript form, which itself went through four major editions, the Legal Process was not published in book form by Foundation Press until 1994. The manuscript editions, however, were widely circulated and very influential among the professoriate, many of whom used it as the foundation for courses at Harvard Law and other institutions.

Together with The Federal Courts, discussed below, The Legal Process within twenty years came to be viewed as "the foundation text of the legal theory known as 'legal process.'" An exploration of law made both by courts and outside the courtroom, scholars have identified three key themes from the work itself: (1) Institutional competence, (2) Statutory interpretation, and (3) principled decisionmaking.

==== Institutional competence ====
"This perspective stresses that Hart and Sacks 'believed that it was possible to distinguish legitimate and illegitimate exercises of official power while simultaneously transcending the centuries-old debate between ... the 'is' and the 'ought'.' The Legal Process demonstrated that lawyers did not have to engage in substantive moral or political reasoning, since 'there could be a kind of natural, functional correlation between different kinds of disputes and different kinds of institutions, so that the categories of dispute could be matched up with the kinds of institutional procedures corresponding to them.' Thus, by adopting the value pluralism of pragmatists like John Dewey, legal process was able to argue - contra the realists - that the analysis of legal validity is not reducible to political ideology."

==== Statutory interpretation ====
Hart and Sacks argued for a shift away from the application of substantive, precedential rules, critiqued by the realists, in favor of application of rules of precedential process. "Granting that substantive fairness is a matter of ideology, the doctrinal approach holds that fairness will result, regardless or even in spite of the judges' biases, if methods of judging which all concede to be fair are followed scrupulously." Hart and Sacks "believed that judges should use various tools of construction -- including the overall policy evinced by the statutory text, the legislative history, and public knowledge . . . -- to determine what 'purpose ought to be attributed to the statute' and to interpret the words 'to carry out the purpose as best it can.'" These procedural rules become a way to distinguish between adjudication and ad hoc legislation, the first of which is the role of the courts. "This view of statutes depended critically on the presumption that procedures existed that could identify the purposes selected by the legislature without actually substantively evaluating those purposes." In their famous phrase, judges "should assume, unless the contrary unmistakably appears, that the legislature was made up of reasonable persons pursuing reasonable purposes reasonably."

==== Principled decision-making ====
One of the key tenets of Hart's thought was "principled decisionmaking," or the idea that "decisions [must] be based on premises of general applicability, otherwise they would be ad hoc or 'legislative'" and that the adjudication must be neutral, "thereby claiming the allegiance of litigants through a tacit arrangement of reciprocity...." Heavily influenced by Justice Benjamin Cardozo's approach to adjudication, "principled" decisionmaking thus transcends the immediate outcome of the case at the bar, and through appeal to neutral adjudication principles, "thereby claim[s] the allegiance of litigants through a tacit arrangement of reciprocity." Principled decisionmaking as an idea would later be fleshed out more fully by Wechsler, in Judge Learned Hand's criticism of the activist Warren Court, and which remains an important and debated concept in modern jurisprudence. Other scholars have tied Hart's requirement of principled reasoning to the wider "postwar liberal project associated with Robert Dahl and John Rawls" as well as with the work of John Hart Ely and Ronald Dworkin.

=== Hart's dialogue ===
In 1953, Hart addressed the question of Congress's power over federal jurisdiction in his very influential article, "The Power of Congress to Limit the Jurisdiction of the Federal Courts." Included in his Federal Courts, which was published later the same year, this article has come to be known as "Hart's Dialogue" and argues for the proposition ("Hart's postulate") that one always has access to a constitutional court to rule on: 1) claims of entitlement to/ sufficiency of judicial process; and 2) claims that rights are violated and not vindicated. While this is not a right to any particular remedy, or any particular court, it is a right to some remedy, somewhere, even if that requires the federal courts to fall back on their general Constitutional grants of power, or for recourse by the individual to the state courts.

=== Federal Courts and the Federal System ===
Hart was a frequent collaborator with Herbert Wechsler, with whom he authored Federal Courts and the Federal System, "the most influential casebook in Constitutional law" and also "the book most frequently cited by the Supreme Court both generally and in constitutional opinions."

Federal Courts "define[d] what has come to be one of the most important schools of legal thought in late twentieth-century America, typically described as 'the legal process school.'" In broad brushstrokes, the school "focuses primary attention on who is, or ought, to make a given legal decision, and how that decision is, or ought to be made.... The question what is or ought to be the substantive law governing citizen behavior in a given area is no longer the sole, or even the dominant, object of legal analysis. Rather, the legal process analysis illuminates how substantive norms governing primary conduct shape, and are in turn shaped by, organizational structure and procedural rules."

In response to the legal realism critique that judges invariably make law, Hart and Wechsler focused the attention of the emerging legal process school on the question of "what kinds of law could [judges] legitimately make, and when?" Hart and Wechsler's initial response was that, if there may be widespread disagreement on what the substantive law is, or ought to be, in a given field, there may at least be agreement as to where institutionally those decisions should be made, and under what conditions or set of rules (such as jurisdiction, procedure, etc.). The role of the courts, particularly with respect to the Constitution, "is essentially a common law function, arising from the court's common law process respecting litigants." Thus, "[b]y paying strict attention to second-order rules allocating power between federal courts and other institutions, the legal process theorists sought to specify with precision the boundaries and purposes of federal judicial power. Once these boundaries were specified, federal judicial decisionmaking could be both legitimated and restrained."

Among innovations introduced by The Federal Courts was the idea of a federal "protective jurisdiction," or the idea that Congress could extend federal jurisdiction to cases implicating a federal interest, "even in the absence of both diversity jurisdiction and a claim based on federal law."

== Influence ==
=== Courts ===
Hart's relationship with Justice Frankfurter both before and following the latter's elevation to the Supreme Court was well known. Indeed, the first edition of Federal Courts was dedicated to Frankfurter. And, on more than one occasion, Justice Frankfurter noted his appreciation for insights provided by his former pupil. Perhaps through the intermediation of his one-time professor, Hart's work, and particularly The Federal Courts, quickly became a standard reference for the Supreme Court.

Lower courts were also impacted by Hart's thinking, particularly on the topic of federal jurisprudence. Hart's construction divided the judiciary into two parts, which he dubbed the "logic of federalism." "The federal courts should serve as the authoritative voice of federal law and national interests, and state courts should serve as the authoritative voices of state law and local interests." This construction would impress later members of the bar, including the very influential Judge Henry Friendly.

=== Academia ===
Hart's impact on academia is equally important, particularly his impact on his contemporaries. One influential contemporary, Lon Fuller, as early as the 1940s acknowledged his indebtedness to the influence of Hart and was himself influential on Hart's thinking and work. Less well-known, yet equally important, is the connection between Hart's Legal Process work and the later work of his contemporary and sometime-fellow at Harvard, Professor H.L.A. Hart. Recently, however, Professor Michael C. Dorf has argued "that soft positivism, understood as a synthesis of the H.L.A. Hart/ [Ronald]Dworkin debate, entails a view about the institutional allocation of power remarkably close to the one articulated by (Henry) Hart and Sacks in the Legal Process."

Hart's impact continues to be felt. Among those influenced by Hart's "intellectual leadership" was Paul J. Mishkin, who "taught from, and was influenced by" and then would go on to edit the third edition of Federal Courts, and who would in turn be very influential on the legal process movement. Similarly, Michael C. Dorf, Professor at Columbia Law School, has continued to argue for a "return to Hart and Sacks's commitment to a legal decisionmaking process that is deeply informed about the institutions with which legal actors interact...."

Other modern academics influenced by Hart in the legal process school include Philip Bobbitt, Alexander Bickel and Robert Bork. Philip Bobbitt cites Hart's process approach to constitutional law as archetypal of one of two strands of the "doctrinal" mode of constitutional jurisprudence, the other being the substantive approach taken by the American Law Institute's Restatements and Model Code efforts of the late 1950s-60s. Another analysis points to a separate split in the legal process school between the legal process approach outlined by Hart and Sacks and a later iteration, "defined by Herbert Wechsler, Alexander Bickel, and Robert Bork" which changed "Hart and Sacks's theory of law into a conservative theory of adjudication. The later legal process scholars' interpretation of Hart and Sacks relied on a controversial form of moral skepticism that assumed that legal norms cannot command judges to enforce moral principles because moral principles did not have any cognizable existence."

=== Bar ===
Finally, Hart's influence has extended beyond the academy to the bar itself through the generation of lawyers trained by him at Harvard and those influenced by his casebook and other works. Amar points to the large number of articles published in the early 1950s at Columbia and Harvard on the topic of federal jurisprudence, as well as the large numbers of "student editors on the editorial boards [at these schools] who went on to become teachers of federal jurisdiction, legal process, and constitutional law" as an important indicia of the influence and "intellectual leadership" Hart and Wechsler had on their respective institutions and, by extension, on American jurisprudence.

== Death ==
Hart died in March 1969 after several years of declining health at age 64.

== Selected bibliography ==
- H. Hart and A. Sacks. The Legal Process: Basic Problems in the Making and Application of Law. New York: Foundation Press, 1994.
- H. Hart and H. Wechsler. The Federal Courts and the Federal System. New York: Foundation Press, 1953.
- H. Hart. The Power of Congress to Limit the Jurisdiction of Federal Courts: An Exercise in Dialectic. 66 Harv. L. Rev. 1362 (1953).
- H. Hart. Professor Crosskey and Judicial Review (Book Review). 67 Harv. L. Rev. 1456 (1954)
- H. Hart. The Relations Between State and Federal Law. 54 Colum. L. Rev. 489 (1954).
- H. Hart. The Supreme Court, 1958 Term - Foreword: The Time Chart of the Justices, 73 Harv. L. Rev. 84 (1959).

== See also ==
- List of law clerks for the fourth seat of the Supreme Court of the United States
