= Legal process (jurisprudence) =

Movement in American law

The legal process school (sometimes "legal process theory") was a movement within American law that attempted to chart a third way between legal formalism and legal realism. Drawing its name from Hart & Sacks' textbook The Legal Process (along with Hart & Wechsler's textbook The Federal Courts and the Federal System, considered a primary canonical text of the school), it is associated with scholars such as Herbert Wechsler, Henry Hart, Albert Sacks and Lon Fuller, and their students such as John Hart Ely and Alexander Bickel. The school grew in the 1950s and 1960s. To this day, the school's influence remains broad.

== Basic precepts ==
- "Institutional Settlement." As the name suggests, the legal process school was deeply interested in the processes by which law is made, and particularly in a federal system, how authority to answer various questions is distributed vertically (as between state and federal governments) and horizontally (as between branches of government) and how this impacts on the legitimacy of decisions. The principle of institutional settlement looks at how society decided: "that law should allocate decisionmaking to the institutions best suited to decide particular questions, and that the decisions arrived at by those institutions must then be respected by other actors in the system, even if those actors would have reached a different conclusion"
- The Rule of Law. Although courts should be aware and respectful of this institutional settlement, courts have an important role to play, and the rule of law "requires the availability of judicial remedies sufficient to vindicate fundamental legal principles." "The role of courts in the Legal Process tradition is often similar to that of a point guard on a basketball team: the court takes provisional responsibility for a dispute, but may well decide to pass it off to other actors in the system
- "Reasoned Elaboration." The legal process school recognized the claims of legal realists that judges do, in fact, make law, and that adjudication is not merely the mechanical deduction from precedent and statutory texts claimed by formalists. Unlike the realists, however, legal process claims that, as Fallon puts it, "while the judicial role is irreducibly creative in some respects, it is limited to the reasoned elaboration of principles and policies that are ultimately traceable to more democratically legitimate decisionmakers." Judges should reason from the totality of the legal materials at issue to reach their conclusions, and while "raw judicial will" sometimes happens, as a matter of observable reality, it is deprecated.
- "What are legal materials? The 'anti-positivist' principle." Legal process generally, but Hart & Sacks particularly, suggest that the legal materials from which the aforementioned reasoned elaboration must take place are not limited to precedent and statutory text. Rather, as Wells puts it, legal process "permit[s]," and may even "require" that legal materials include "general ethical principles and widely shared social goals ... [because] 'the law rests upon a body of hard-won and deeply-embedded principles and policies.'" Hart & Sacks stressed that this did not mean that judges were authorized to impute their own preferences into law, but rather, that there are broad legal authorities embedded in and assumed by narrower texts. This leads legal process to look at purpose and structure as well as text (for example, "federalism," "separation of powers" nor "judicial review" are not explicitly stated in the Constitution, but are eminently clear from the general structure of government delineated therein). "Any particular legal directive must be seen and interpreted in light of the whole body of law."
- Neutral principles. Courts must reason from legal materials using principles that "in their generality and their neutrality transcend any immediate result that is involved." A judge must decide a case on reasoning "that he would be willing to follow in other situations to which it applies," which is to say that a principled decision must announce that the case being decided is "an instance of a more inclusive class of cases" and is being "treated in a certain manner because it is held to be proper to treat cases of its type in a certain manner." When a case or class of cases present questions that cannot be adjudicated through application of neutral principles, courts should refuse to decide such questions: "[t]hey should decline to impose substantive judicial judgments on disputes not capable of resolution through the application of neutral principles to sharply defined sets of facts." In the legal process concept, "the integrity of the judicial process may be compromised if ... [cases are decided on] arguments that extend no further than the case at hand. ... Only by insisting on a level of generality, some distance between the reasons and the facts of the case at hand, can one be certain that judges are actually reasoning from legal materials rather than indulging their own preferences." When a judge "adopt[s] a general rule, and say[s], 'This is the basis of our decision,' [they] not only constrain lower courts, [they] constrain [themselves] as well. If the next case should have such different facts that [their] political or policy preferences regarding the outcome are quite the opposite, [they] will be unable to indulge those preferences ... hav[ing] committed [themselves] to the governing principle."
- Traditional dispute resolution. Similar to the directive that courts should not hear disputes that cannot be resolved through neutral principles (i.e. political questions) is the notion that courts in the American system of government are institutionally limited to resolving the kinds of disputes courts traditionally resolved: "'bipolar' disputes in which each of two contending parties introduces arguments making a claim of right or an accusation of guilt, and in which the judge's task is to choose between them on a reasoned basis."

Although legal process is no longer popular by name, particularly in the academy, it can be seen as harmonizing with both major modern schools of judicial thought, textualism and purposivism, depending on which of the foregoing assumptions are emphasized.

== See also ==
- International legal theory
