= Alexander Bickel =

20th-century legal scholar

- Born: Alexander Mordecai Bickel; December 17, 1924; Bucharest, Romania
- Died: November 7, 1974 (aged 49); New Haven, Connecticut, U.S.
- Spouse: Josephine Napolino

Academic background
- Education: City College of New York (BA); Harvard University (LLB)
- Influences: Edmund Burke; Felix Frankfurter; Henry M. Hart Jr.; James Madison

Academic work
- Discipline: Constitutional law
- School or tradition: Legal process school
- Institutions: Yale University
- Notable works: The Least Dangerous Branch (1962)
- Notable ideas: Countermajoritarian difficulty
- Influenced: Samuel Alito; Robert Bork; Felix Frankfurter; John Roberts

Alexander Mordecai Bickel (December 17, 1924 – November 7, 1974) was an American legal scholar who promoted a conservative interpretation of the United States Constitution. One of the most influential constitutional commentators of the twentieth century, his writings emphasize judicial restraint.

== Life and career ==
Bickel was born on December 17, 1924, in Bucharest, Romania, to Jewish parents, Solomo and Yetta Bickel. The family immigrated to New York City in 1939. He graduated Phi Beta Kappa from City College of New York in 1947 and summa cum laude from Harvard Law School in 1949.

Following law school, Bickel was a law clerk for federal Judge Calvert Magruder of the United States Court of Appeals for the First Circuit. In 1950, he went to Europe as a law officer of the US State Department, serving in Frankfurt, Germany, and with the European Defense Community Observer Delegation in Paris.

In 1952, he returned to the U.S., and clerked for Justice Felix Frankfurter of the Supreme Court in 1952 and 1953. He prepared a historic memorandum for Frankfurter, urging that Brown v. Board of Education be reargued.

In 1956, he became an instructor at Yale Law School, where he taught until his death. He was named Chancellor Kent Professor of Law and Legal History in 1966, and Sterling Professor of Law in 1974.

He was a friend and colleague of Charles Black, another influential scholar of constitutional law.

A frequent contributor to Commentary, New Republic, and The New York Times, Bickel argued against "prior restraint" of the press by the government as part of the successful representation of The New York Times in the Pentagon Papers case (1971). He also defended President Richard Nixon's order to dismiss special Watergate prosecutor Archibald Cox.

Bickel died of cancer on November 7, 1974, at his home in Connecticut, at 49 years of age.

== Contributions ==
Bickel's most distinctive contribution to constitutional law was to stress what he called "the passive virtues" of judicial decision-making – the refusal to decide cases on substantive grounds if narrower grounds exist to decide the case. Bickel viewed "private ordering" and the voluntary working-out of problems as generally preferable to legalistic solutions.

In his books The Supreme Court and the Idea of Progress and The Morality of Consent, Bickel attacked the Warren Court for what he saw as its misuse of history, shoddy reasoning, and sometimes arbitrary results. Bickel thought that the Warren Court's two most important lines of decision, Brown v. Board of Education and Baker v. Carr, did not produce the results the court had intended. In his book The Least Dangerous Branch: The Supreme Court at the Bar of Politics, Bickel coined the term countermajoritarian difficulty to describe his view that judicial review stands in tension with democratic theory. The work contains the seeds of an unabated debate about the moral, political, and adjudicative roles of the Supreme Court.

Bickel envisioned the Supreme Court as playing a statesman-like role in national controversies, engaging in dialogue with the other branches of government. Thus he did not see the court as a purely passive body, but as one which should lead public opinion, albeit carefully.

Bickel's writings addressed such varied topics as constitutionalism and Burkean thought, citizenship, civil disobedience, freedom of speech, moral authority and intellectual thought. Bickel has been cited by Chief Justice John Roberts and by Justice Samuel Alito as a major influence and is widely considered one of the most influential constitutional conservatives of the 20th century.

A February 1970 essay in which he argued court-ordered school desegregation was unattainable was used by President Richard Nixon as political cover to resist school busing as part of his strategy for re-election in 1972.

Relative to Alito's legal thinking and philosophy, one writer in 2011 looked particularly at Alito dissents in Snyder v. Phelps, Brown v. Entertainment Merchants Association, and United States v. Stevens, three First Amendment cases. The writer traced the influence of The Supreme Court and the Idea of Progress, The Morality of Consent and other Bickel writings both as they bore on Alito's developing thinking in college and as he chose to go to Yale (Bickel would die during Alito's third year there); and as the Bickel writings bore on the solitary or minority opinions Alito wrote in the three cases, here departing in cases even from other usually allied conservative members of the court.

Bickel was a gifted and easily accessible instructor. In 1971, he was elected a fellow of the American Academy of Arts and Sciences. He inaugurated the DeVane Lecture series at Yale in 1972 where he taught a large class mostly of Yale undergraduates.

== Selected bibliography ==
- The Least Dangerous Branch (Bobbs-Merrill, 1962) ISBN 9780300032994
- Politics and the Warren Court (Harper & Row, 1965)
- The Supreme Court and the Idea of Progress (Harper & Row, 1970) ISBN 0300022395
- The Morality of Consent (Yale University Press, 1975) ISBN 9780300021196
- History of the Supreme Court of the United States: The Judiciary and Responsible Government: 1910-1921 (vol. IX, Macmillan, 1984) ISBN 0521877644
- SCOTUSblog Online Symposium on The Least Dangerous Branch (August 2012)

== See also ==
- List of law clerks for the second seat of the Supreme Court of the United States
