= Paul M. Bator =

American lawyer (1929–1989)

Paul Michael Bator

Principal Deputy Solicitor General of the United States
- In office October 1982 – December 1983
- President: Ronald Reagan
- Succeeded by: Charles Fried

Personal details
- Born: June 2, 1929 Budapest, Hungary
- Died: February 24, 1989 (aged 59) Chicago, Illinois, U.S.
- Party: Republican
- Education: Princeton University (BA); Harvard University (MA, LLB)

Paul Michael Bator (June 2, 1929 – February 24, 1989) was a Hungarian-born American legal scholar, Supreme Court advocate, and academic expert on United States federal courts. He taught for almost 30 years at Harvard Law School and the University of Chicago Law School. He also served as the United States Deputy Solicitor General during the Reagan administration, in which capacity he argued and won the landmark administrative law case Chevron U.S.A. v. Natural Resources Defense Council. From 1984 to 2024, the Chevron doctrine governed the judicial interpretation of Congressional statutes that authorized federal regulators to make law.

He clerked for Justice John Marshall Harlan II of the United States Supreme Court.

== Early life and education ==
Bator was born in 1929 in Budapest, Hungary, to Victor and Franciska Bator. His father was an expert in banking law and taught at the University of Budapest. He had two siblings: his twin brother Peter, also an attorney, and Francis, an economist.

Bator moved with his parents to the United States in 1939, where his father managed the Amerikai-Magyar Nepsava, a Hungarian-language newspaper. His father was twice stripped of Hungarian citizenship, first due to his anti-Nazi activism, then due to his post-World War II anti-Communist activism.

He attended Groton School, as did his two brothers. He went on to Princeton University, where he was the valedictorian, graduating in 1951 with an A.B., summa cum laude. He earned a Master of Arts in history from Harvard University in 1953. He then attended Harvard Law School, where he was once again the valedictorian, and also served as president of the Harvard Law Review. He graduated in 1956 with an LL.B., summa cum laude.

From 1956 to 1957, Bator clerked for Justice John Marshall Harlan II of the United States Supreme Court.

== Career ==
=== Harvard Law School ===
Following a brief period of private practice at the law firm Debevoise & Plimpton, Bator began teaching at Harvard Law School in 1959. While teaching his recommendation of students for clerkships carried a lot of weight with Harlan. He was promoted to full professor in 1962 and associate dean in 1971, serving in the latter capacity until 1975.

While at Harvard, he published many articles, including his famous piece, "Finality in Criminal Law and Federal Habeas Corpus for State Prisoners," 76 Harv. L. Rev. 441 (1963), which described "how with reason we can arrive at just the reasonable balance between fairness and the need to attain finality in the criminal process." He also co-authored the second (1973) and third (1988) editions of Hart & Wechsler's "The Federal Courts and the Federal System," a leading text on federal jurisdiction.

=== Deputy Solicitor General ===
In 1982, Harvard granted Bator a leave of absence so that he could become the Deputy Solicitor General of the United States.

Bator argued and won eight cases on behalf of the government at the Supreme Court, including Hishon v. King & Spalding, which held that Title VII of the Civil Rights Act applies to partnership selection at law firms; Grove City College v. Bell, which applied provisions of Title IX of the Civil Rights Act narrowly; Clark v. Community for Creative Non-Violence, which denied that protesters' First Amendment rights were violated by a law prohibiting overnight sleeping in Washington, D.C. memorial parks; and Reagan v. Wald, which allowed the government to impose currency restrictions on travelers to Cuba. His most famous victory was Chevron U.S.A. v. Natural Resources Defense Council. Under the Chevron doctrine, when a regulated party claimed that a regulatory agency's ambiguous governing statute did not authorize a particular agency rule or adjudication, courts would defer to that agency's construction (if reasonable) of its own governing statute. The Chevron doctrine lasted for forty years until the Supreme Court overruled it in Loper Bright Enterprises v. Raimondo (2024).

In 1984, President Ronald Reagan nominated Bator to the United States Court of Appeals for the D.C. Circuit, but he withdrew his name due to illness.

Bator would continue representing litigants in the Supreme Court after leaving the federal government. In his last Supreme Court appearance on October 4, 1988, he successfully represented the United States Sentencing Commission in Mistretta v. United States challenging the Commission's constitutional validity.

=== University of Chicago ===
Bator returned to Harvard in 1984, but departed due to "what he felt was an increasing factionalization at the law school and what he saw as its dominance by left-leaning faculty members." He specifically said that the Critical Legal Studies movement had had "an absolutely disastrous effect on [Harvard's] intellectual and institutional life ... [s]tarting with the premise that confrontation, trashing and disparagement are legitimate instruments for creating a radical political ambiance."

In 1986, Bator joined the University of Chicago Law School, where he became the John P. Wilson Professor of Law. The New York Times reported that at the time, Chicago's faculty was "both more closely knit and conservative in its thinking than Harvard's." Bator simultaneously served as associate counsel with the firm Mayer, Brown & Platt, where he practiced appellate law.

In 1987, Bator testified in support of Judge Robert Bork, whose nomination to the United States Supreme Court was rejected by the Senate. He also wrote an op-ed supporting Bork in the New York Times, explaining that it would not be "good for the country, in the long run, to encourage Senators to subject all [judicial] appointments to an ideological test." He opined that "conservative attacks on the 'extremist' and 'radical' Justice [Louis] Brandeis are this century's closest precedent for the attacks on Judge Bork today."

=== Other ===
Bator was a member of the American Law Institute and a fellow of the American Academy of Arts and Sciences.

== End of life and legacy ==
Bator died in 1989 and was survived by his wife, Alice Garrett Hoag Bator; sons, Thomas and Michael; and daughter, Julia.

=== Harvard Law Review tribute ===
In June 1989, Harvard Law Review published tributes to Bator by Professor David L. Shapiro, Professor Charles Fried and then-judge Stephen Breyer. Fried characterized Bator's teaching as "Mozartian," displaying "a brilliance, a clarity of intelligence, deployed with lightning speed and a distinctive style that was at once inventive and entirely apt" and described his briefs and arguments before the Supreme Court as "sonatas of reason."

=== Paul M. Bator Award ===
Following Bator's death, the Federalist Society established the Paul M. Bator Award, given to a law professor under the age of 40 "who demonstrated excellence in legal scholarship, a commitment to teaching, a concern for students, and who has made a significant public impact." In 2018, the award was replaced with the Joseph Story Award.

==== Past Bator Award recipients ====
Year	Professor
1990	Stephen L. Carter
1991	Randy Barnett
1992	Geoffrey Miller
1993	Akhil Amar
1994	Robert P. George
1995	Jonathan Macey
1996	Michael Stokes Paulsen
1997	John McGinnis
1998	Paul Cassell
1999	Eugene Volokh
2000	John F. Manning
2001	John Yoo
2002	Roderick Hills Jr.
2003	Adrian Vermeule
2004	Jonathan H. Adler
2005	Ernest A. Young
2006	Caleb Nelson
2007	Orin Kerr
2008	Saikrishna Prakash
2009	Nicole Stelle Garnett
2010	M. Todd Henderson
2011	Brian T. Fitzpatrick
2012	Eugene Kontorovich
2013	Nita A. Farahany
2014	Joshua D. Wright
2015	Joshua Kleinfeld
2016	Tara Leigh Grove
2017	William Baude

== See also ==
- List of law clerks for the ninth seat of the Supreme Court of the United States
