= Presidential Commission on the Supreme Court of the United States =

US commission of 2021

History
- Established by: Joe Biden on April 9, 2021
- Disbanded: December 8, 2021
- Related Executive Order number(s): 14023

Membership
- Chairperson: Robert Bauer; Cristina M. Rodríguez

The Presidential Commission on the Supreme Court of the United States (PCSCOTUS), also known informally as the Supreme Court commission, was a Presidential Commission established by U.S. President Joe Biden to investigate the idea of reforming the Supreme Court. It was slated to provide a nonpartisan analysis of "the principal arguments in the contemporary public debate for and against Supreme Court reform".

The commission issued its final report on December 8, 2021, which reviewed various legal questions about the Supreme Court. It did not recommend major changes to the operation of the Court, and no reforms resulted from the commission.

== Origins ==
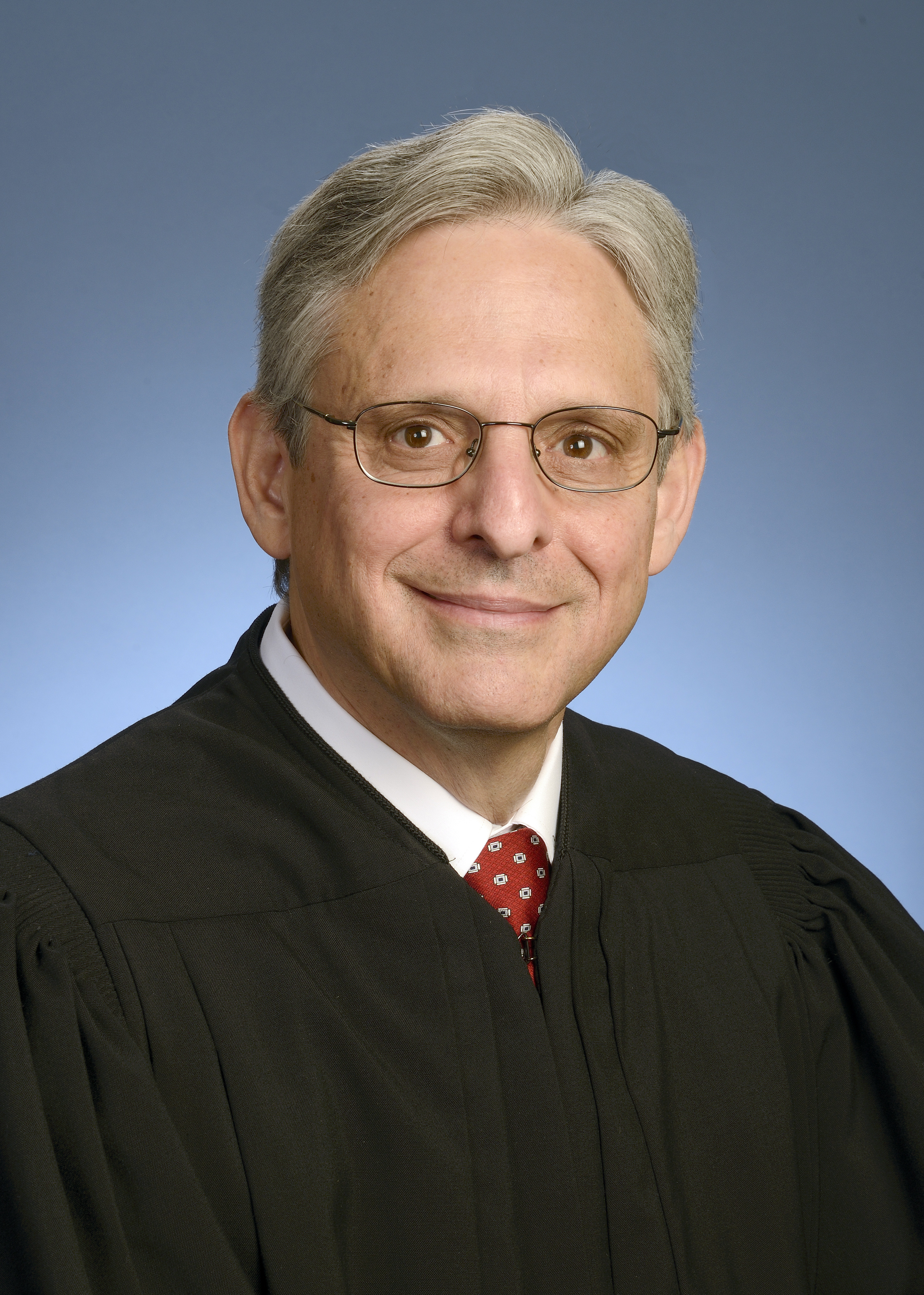
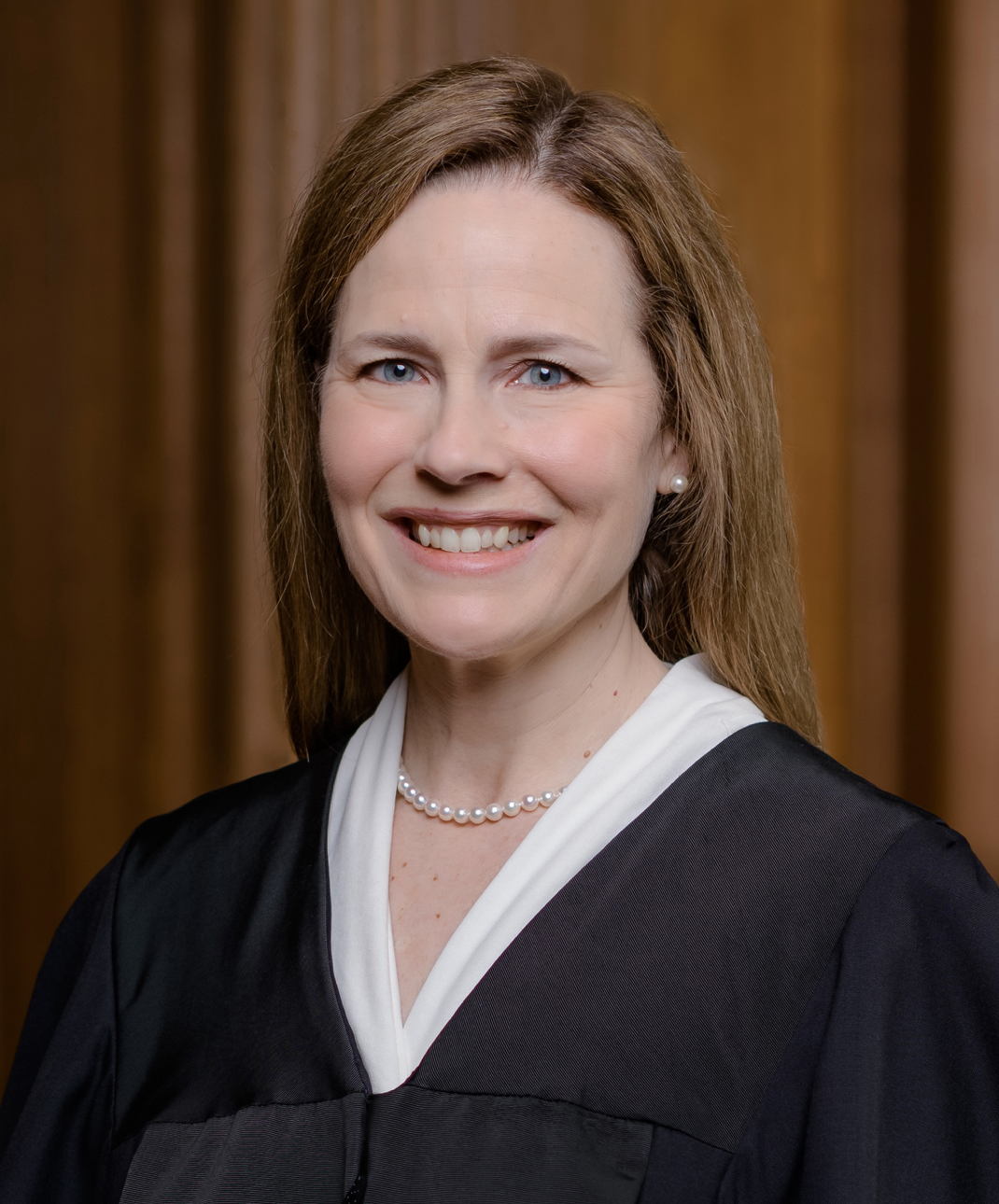
When Merrick Garland (left) was nominated 237 days before the 2016 presidential election, the Senate refused to conduct hearings. When Amy Coney Barrett (right) was nominated 35 days before the 2020 presidential election, the Senate approved her nomination.

=== Politicization of the Supreme Court ===
Months before the commission was established, Amy Coney Barrett had been nominated to the Supreme Court by then-president Donald Trump. This nomination was controversial. In 2016, Republicans had invoked the informal and seldom-used Thurmond rule to block the nomination of Merrick Garland, based on its proximity to a presidential election. Garland's nomination had come nearly 10 months before the 2016 United States presidential election. However, Trump's nomination of Barrett came just over one month before the 2020 United States presidential election, and was appointed to the court. Many Democrats interpreted this as unjust, and proof of politicization in Supreme Court nominations. This grievance, along with the Republicans' resulting 6–3 majority, led to pressure from some Democrats to respond accordingly.

=== Proposals from Democrats ===
During the 2020 Democratic primaries, Pete Buttigieg proposed that the size of the Supreme Court be increased to 15, in order to reduce the significance of partisanship. He described the proposal as "no more a departure from norms than what the Republicans did to get the judiciary to the place it is today”.

Rather than a specific proposal, Biden signaled the idea of the commission on the 2020 campaign trail, saying the court was "getting out of whack". Biden also stated that "it’s not about court-packing,” adding that "there’s a number of other things that our constitutional scholars have debated… the last thing we need to do is turn the Supreme Court into just a political football". Biden won the Democratic primary, and then the 2020 United States presidency.

== Commencement ==
The commission was established through Executive Order 14023, issued on April 9, 2021. The order determined that the commission must issue a report within 180 days of its first public meeting, which took place May 19, 2021.

An editorial of The Wall Street Journal wrote that the commission's membership "tilts sharply to the legal and political left", and the libertarian Cato Institute estimated the ratio of progressives to conservatives as 3:1. However, an article in Vox described the membership as a "win for the [conservative] Federalist Society", saying that "while the author of one of the most significant attacks on Obamacare in the last decade [Thomas B. Griffith] is on Biden’s commission, none of the leading academic proponents of Supreme Court reform were appointed". These leading academic proponents included Daniel Epps and Ganesh Sitaraman, who had authored Pete Buttigieg's proposal to expand the Supreme Court, and who were not invited to the commission.

== Report ==
The final report was submitted to President Biden on December 7, 2021, with unanimous approval. The 300-page final report reviewed the history and legal significance of various questions around the Supreme Court, but did not support any structural changes. While it was generally supportive of allowing TV cameras in the courtroom, it did not take a position on issues such as term limits or expanding the court.

Biden had not asked the commission for recommendations, and did not commit to a specific timeline to review the report. This led to criticism that the report was not seriously intended to improve the institution. Some progressive members of the commission specified that their approval was to submit the report to Biden, not a vote to retain the status quo.

As of 2026, no legal reforms have resulted from the commission.

== Members ==
Member	Role	Relevant experience	Appointed	Left commission
Robert Bauer	Co-chair	Former White House Counsel	April 9, 2021	December 8, 2021
Cristina M. Rodríguez	Co-chair	Professor at Yale Law School	April 9, 2021	December 8, 2021
Michelle Adams	Member	Professor at the Cardozo School of Law	April 9, 2021	December 8, 2021
Kate Andrias	Rapporteur	Professor at Michigan Law School	April 9, 2021	December 8, 2021
Jack Balkin	Member	Professor at Yale Law School	April 9, 2021	October 2021
William Baude	Member	Professor at the University of Chicago Law School	April 9, 2021	December 8, 2021
Guy-Uriel E. Charles	Member	Professor at Duke Law School	April 9, 2021	December 8, 2021
Andrew Manuel Crespo	Member	Professor at Harvard Law School	April 9, 2021	December 8, 2021
Walter E. Dellinger III	Member	Professor at Duke Law School; former Acting Solicitor General of the United States	April 9, 2021	December 8, 2021
Justin Driver	Member	Professor at Yale Law School	April 9, 2021	December 8, 2021
Richard H. Fallon Jr.	Member	Professor at Harvard Law School	April 9, 2021	December 8, 2021
Caroline Fredrickson	Member	Former president of the American Constitution Society; former Distinguished Visitor from Practice at the Georgetown University Law Center	April 9, 2021	December 8, 2021
Heather K. Gerken	Member	Dean of Yale Law School	April 9, 2021	December 8, 2021
Nancy Gertner	Member	Former judge of the United States District Court for the District of Massachusetts	April 9, 2021	December 8, 2021
Jack Goldsmith	Member	Professor at Harvard Law School; former United States Assistant Attorney General for the Office of Legal Counsel	April 9, 2021	December 8, 2021
Thomas B. Griffith	Member	Former judge of the United States Court of Appeals for the District of Columbia Circuit	April 9, 2021	December 8, 2021
Tara Leigh Grove	Member	Professor at the University of Alabama Law School	April 9, 2021	December 8, 2021
Bert Huang	Member	Professor at Columbia Law School	April 9, 2021	December 8, 2021
Sherrilyn Ifill	Member	President of the NAACP Legal Defense Fund	April 9, 2021	December 8, 2021
Olatunde C. Johnson	Member	Professor at Columbia Law School	April 9, 2021	December 8, 2021
Michael S. Kang	Member	Professor at Northwestern Law School	April 9, 2021	December 8, 2021
Alison LaCroix	Member	Professor at the University of Chicago Law School	April 9, 2021	December 8, 2021
Margaret H. Lemos	Member	Professor at Duke Law School	April 9, 2021	December 8, 2021
David F. Levi	Member	Former dean of Duke Law School; former chief judge of the United States District Court for the Eastern District of California; former judge of the United States District Court for the Eastern District of California; former United States Attorney for the Eastern District of California	April 9, 2021	December 8, 2021
Trevor Morrison	Member	Dean of the New York University School of Law	April 9, 2021	December 8, 2021
Caleb Nelson	Member	Professor at the University of Virginia Law School	April 9, 2021	October 2021
Richard Pildes	Member	Professor at the New York University School of Law	April 9, 2021	December 8, 2021
Michael D. Ramsey	Member	Professor at the University of San Diego Law School	April 9, 2021	December 8, 2021
Kermit Roosevelt III	Member	Professor at the University of Pennsylvania Law School; great-great-grandson of Theodore Roosevelt	April 9, 2021	December 8, 2021
Bertrall Ross	Member	Professor at the UC Berkeley School of Law	April 9, 2021	December 8, 2021
David A. Strauss	Member	Professor at the University of Chicago Law School	April 9, 2021	December 8, 2021
Laurence Tribe	Member	Professor at Harvard Law School; co-founder of the American Constitution Society	April 9, 2021	December 8, 2021
Adam White	Member	Resident scholar at the American Enterprise Institute	April 9, 2021	December 8, 2021
Keith Whittington	Member	Professor at Princeton University	April 9, 2021	December 8, 2021
Michael Waldman	Member	President of the Brennan Center for Justice; former White House Director of Speechwriting	April 9, 2021	December 8, 2021

Two of the commission's members, Caleb Nelson and Jack Goldsmith, had resigned their positions by October 2021.

== See also ==
- List of executive actions by Joe Biden#2021
- January 6 commission
- Judicial Procedures Reform Bill of 1937
