= Daniel Epps =

American legal scholar

- Born: 1982 (age 43–44)

Academic background
- Education: Duke University (AB); Harvard University (JD)

Academic work
- Discipline: Constitutional law, federal courts, criminal law and procedure
- Institutions: Washington University in St. Louis

Daniel Epps (born c. 1982) is an American legal scholar of U.S. constitutional law and of U.S. criminal law and procedure. He serves as the Howard and Caroline Cayne Distinguished Professor of Law at the Washington University School of Law.

== Early life and education ==
Epps was born in 1982. His father, Garrett Epps, is a legal scholar and author who taught at the law schools of the University of Oregon and the University of Baltimore. Epps graduated from Duke University in 2004 with a Bachelor of Arts, summa cum laude, in philosophy, and from Harvard Law School in 2008 with a Juris Doctor, magna cum laude. As a law student, Epps was the articles co-chair of the Harvard Law Review and received the John M. Olin Law & Economics Prize.

== Career ==
After graduating from law school, Epps was a law clerk to Judge J. Harvie Wilkinson III of the U.S. Court of Appeals for the Fourth Circuit from 2008 to 2009 and to Justice Anthony Kennedy of the U.S. Supreme Court from 2009 to 2010. Epps was co-clerks with Scott Keller and Misha Tseytlin.

Following his clerkships, Epps practiced appellate litigation as an associate at King & Spalding from 2010 to 2013. Epps drafted the petition for certiorari and merits briefing in Walden v. Fiore (2014). Epps' amicus brief for Professor Stephen Sachs in Atlantic Marine Construction Co. v. U.S. District Court (2013) was recognized by the Green Bag as an example of exemplary legal writing. Epps was then a Climenko Fellow and Lecturer on Law at Harvard Law School prior to becoming a professor at Washington University School of Law.

Epps has published scholarly articles on Supreme Court reform, U.S. constitutional law, federal courts, and criminal law and procedure. Epps has regularly been cited by news publications, such as the New York Times, Washington Post, and Wall Street Journal, for his Supreme Court scholarship and as a source for Supreme Court commentary. A proposal by Epps and Ganesh Sitaraman to restructure the Supreme Court gained widespread media attention after it was endorsed by Mayor Pete Buttigieg during his 2020 presidential campaign. Epps testified on Supreme Court reform before the Presidential Commission on the Supreme Court in July 2021.

Epps served as co-counsel for the defendant in Ocasio v. United States (2016). In 2020, Epps was a Special Counsel for Senator Sheldon Whitehouse during the confirmation of Judge Amy Coney Barrett to the Supreme Court.

Epps co-hosts the legal podcast Divided Argument with William Baude. He also serves as Of Counsel at Wilkinson Stekloff.

== Selected scholarly works ==
- Epps, Daniel (2015). "The Consequences of Error in Criminal Justice". Harvard Law Review. 128 (4): 1065–1151.
- — (2016). "Adversarial Asymmetry in the Criminal Process". New York University Law Review. 91 (4): 762–854.
- — (2018). "Harmless Errors and Substantial Rights". Harvard Law Review. 131 (8): 2117–2186.
- —; Ganesh Sitaraman (2019). "How to Save the Supreme Court". Yale Law Journal. 129 (1): 148–206.
- Ortman, William (2020). "The Defender General". University of Pennsylvania Law Review. 168 (6): 1469–1540. Archived from the original on October 26, 2022.
- —; Adam Chilton; Kyle Rozema; Maya Sen (2021). "Designing Supreme Court Term Limits". Southern California Law Review. 95 (1): 1–72.
- —; Danielle D'Onfro (2023). "The Fourth Amendment and General Law". Yale Law Journal. 132 (4): 910–993.
- —; Alan M. Trammell (2023). "The False Promise of Jurisdiction Stripping". Columbia Law Review. 123 (7): 2077–2152.

== See also ==
- List of law clerks for the first seat of the Supreme Court of the United States
