= Richard H. Fallon Jr. =

American legal scholar (1952–2025)

- Fallon at Harvard Law School in 2023
- Born: January 4, 1952; Augusta, Maine, US
- Died: July 13, 2025 (aged 73)
- Education: Yale University (BA, JD); University of Oxford (MA)
- Title: Joseph Story Professor of Law
- Spouse: Jenny Fallon (m. 1982)
- Awards: Thomas M. Cooley Book Prize (2019); Daniel Meltzer Award (2021)

Academic work
- Discipline: Constitutional law and federal courts
- Institutions: Harvard Law School

Richard Henry Fallon Jr. (January 4, 1952 – July 13, 2025) was an American legal scholar and the Joseph Story Professor of Law at Harvard Law School. He was a scholar of constitutional law and federal courts, teaching and writing on those subjects at Harvard from 1982 until he died in 2025.

He received the Georgetown Center for the Constitution's Thomas M. Cooley Book Prize and the Association of American Law Schools' Daniel Meltzer Award.

== Early life ==
Fallon was born in Augusta, Maine, on January 4, 1952, the oldest of Richard H. and Jean Murray Fallon's five children. He attended Cony High School, where he became his class's valedictorian, before matriculating to Yale College and earning a Bachelor of Arts degree in history in 1975. He then received a Rhodes Scholarship to the University of Oxford, where he completed an interdisciplinary degree in philosophy, politics and economics in 1977. He returned to the United States and earned a Juris Doctor degree from Yale Law School in 1980 before serving as a law clerk for Judge J. Skelly Wright of the United States Court of Appeals for the District of Columbia Circuit and Justice Lewis F. Powell Jr. of the Supreme Court of the United States.

== Academic career ==
After clerking, Fallon joined the Harvard Law School faculty in 1982, became a full professor with tenure in 1987, and taught until his death in 2025. He worked mainly in the areas of constitutional law (especially the First Amendment) and federal courts. During his tenure, he held several endowed chairs. In 2005, Fallon was named Ralph S. Tyler Jr. Professor of Constitutional Law, succeeding Laurence Tribe. He later became the Joseph Story Professor of Law. In addition to teaching at Harvard Law School, he offered a course in the government department at Harvard College, where he was an affiliate professor of government.

Fallon's legal scholarship addressed various issues of constitutional interpretation, especially in the area of federal courts doctrine. By the time of his death, he had published more than 100 scholarly works. Among them were two prominent casebooks: the Hart and Wechsler federal courts casebook, which he edited the fourth through seventh editions (and various supplements) with scholars including David Shapiro, Daniel Meltzer, Amanda Tyler, John F. Manning, Jack Goldsmith, James Pfander and William Baude; and a constitutional law casebook that he co-edited with, among others, Michael Dorf, Frederick Schauer, and Sherif Girgis.

Fallon's constitutional scholarship advanced a practical, doctrinal approach to understanding the Constitution—one that recognized a role for judges to avoid intolerable or "unacceptable" outcomes, but that nonetheless constrained judges to pursue predictable outcomes through consistent methods that formed coherent doctrine. For example, these views led him—in his scholarship on federal courts—to advance what he called an "equilibration thesis": the idea that judges (consciously or otherwise) balance concerns about justiciability, substantive legal rights, and available remedies to develop a "single, overall, mutually interconnected and reciprocally influencing package" that is, in some measure, optimal.

This realist approach often led him to be critical of originalism, though he frequently engaged with originalists and developed a reputation among students and law professors alike for fair-mindedness. Indeed, in 2019, his book Law and Legitimacy in the Supreme Court received the Thomas Cooley book prize from the Georgetown University Law Center's Center for the Constitution, directed by prominent conservative academic Randy Barnett, who hailed Fallon's book as a "scholarly and fair-minded ... [systematic] examin[ation of] a much-neglected topic in constitutional theory: exactly what makes a constitution legitimate—not merely in the sense that it is accepted by the general public, but that it is morally legitimate and ought to be accepted." He also frequently appeared as a liberal interlocutor at Federalist Society events. At its 2023 National Lawyers Convention he sat on a panel with Barnett, Harvard colleague Stephen Sachs, and Catholic University Law School professor Joel Alicea, which considered the question of whether the Supreme Court was, in fact, originalist. He also participated in Federalist Society events at Harvard with all three. But in addition to his criticism of originalism, he criticized scholars of all stripes who departed from what he viewed as the scholar's vocation in writing amicus briefs that advocated for outcomes based on evidence that would not be acceptable in published legal scholarship.

For his lifetime achievement in teaching and scholarship on federal courts, he also received the 2021 Daniel J. Meltzer Award from the Association of American Law Schools, named after his long-time colleague and co-author. Fallon was also a member of the American Law Institute and the American Academy of Arts and Sciences. In 2021, President Joe Biden appointed Fallon to serve as a member of the Presidential Commission on the Supreme Court of the United States.

After Fallon's death, the Harvard Law Review dedicated an issue, featuring tributes from Justice Elena Kagan, Dean John C.P. Goldberg, and Carol Steiker, to his memory. In her tribute, Justice Kagan wrote that Fallon's federal courts class was "the most rigorous, most challenging, and most exciting" course she took at Harvard Law School.

== Personal life ==
Fallon was married for more than four decades to his wife Jenny, a Swarthmore College graduate he met while living in Washington, D.C., and he had two children: Elizabeth and Doug. He died from an aggressive form of cancer on July 13, 2025, at the age of 73.

== Selected bibliography ==
- Richard H. Fallon Jr., A Constructivist Coherence Theory of Constitutional Interpretation, 100 Harvard Law Review 1189 (1987)
- Fallon, Of Legislative Courts, Administrative Agencies, and Article III, 101 Harv. L. Rev. 915 (1988)
- Fallon, Foreword: Implementing the Constitution, 111 Harv. L. Rev. 54 (1997)
- Fallon, Legitimacy and the Constitution, 118 Harv. L. Rev. 1787 (2005)
- Fallon, The Linkage Between Justiciability and Remedies—and Their Connections to Substantive Rights, 92 Virginia Law Review 633 (2006)
- Fallon, The Core of an Uneasy Case for Judicial Review, 121 Harv. L. Rev. 1693 (2008)
- Fallon, Constitutionally Forbidden Legislative Intent, 130 Harv. L. Rev. 523 (2016)
- Fallon, Law and Legitimacy in the Supreme Court, Cambridge: Belknap Press (2018)
- Fallon, Non–Article III Federal Tribunals: An Essay on the Relation Between Theory and Practice, 99 Notre Dame Law Review 1691 (2024)

== See also ==
- List of law clerks for the first seat of the Supreme Court of the United States
