= David A. Strauss =

American legal scholar

David A. Strauss is an American legal scholar who is the Gerald Ratner Distinguished Service Professor of Law at the University of Chicago Law School. He is a constitutional law scholar and the author of The Living Constitution (2010), an influential work on the interpretation of the Constitution of the United States and judicial decision-making. He has argued 19 cases before the Supreme Court of the United States.

== Education and career ==
Strauss graduated from Harvard College with an A.B., summa cum laude, in 1973. He studied at Magdalen College, Oxford, on a Marshall Scholarship and received a B.Phil. in politics in 1975. In 1978, he graduated with a J.D., magna cum laude, from Harvard Law School, where he was developments editor of the Harvard Law Review.

After graduating from Harvard Law School, Strauss clerked for Judge Irving L. Goldberg on the U.S. Court of Appeals for the Fifth Circuit. In 1979, he worked as an Attorney-Adviser in the Office of Legal Counsel of the U.S. Department of Justice. Between 1981 and 1985, he was an Assistant to the Solicitor General of the United States.

Strauss joined the University of Chicago Law School faculty in 1985. He has published numerous articles on a variety of subjects, principally in constitutional law and related areas, and two books: The Living Constitution (2010) and Democracy and Equality: The Enduring Constitutional Vision of the Warren Court (2019) (with fellow Chicago professor Geoffrey R. Stone). He has taught constitutional law, federal jurisdiction, elements of the law, and administrative law. He is also an editor of the Supreme Court Review. He has been a visiting professor at Harvard Law School and Georgetown University Law Center. He is a Fellow of the American Academy of Arts and Sciences. He is currently a faculty director of the Jenner & Block Supreme Court and Appellate Clinic.

Strauss has argued 19 cases before the Supreme Court of the United States. In 1990, he served as special counsel to the committee on the Judiciary of the U.S. Senate. He is a member of the national board of directors of the American Constitution Society. He has also served as chair of the board of trustees of the University of Chicago Laboratory Schools and as a member of the board of governors of the Chicago Council of Lawyers.

In 2021, Strauss, together with fellow faculty members William Baude and Alison LaCroix, was appointed by U.S. President Joe Biden to the Presidential Commission on the Supreme Court of the United States.
