= Enforcement =

Process of ensuring compliance with laws, regulations, rules, standards, or social norms

Enforcement is a stage in the proceedings of the SEC

Enforcement is the proper execution of the process of ensuring compliance with laws, regulations, rules, standards, and social norms.

Governments attempt to effectuate successful implementation of policies by enforcing laws and regulations. Enactment refers to application of a law or regulation, or carrying out of an executive or judicial order.

== Theories of enforcement ==
Enforcement serves a number of functions; the enforcement of social norms can ensure conformity within insular communities, the enforcements of laws can maximize social benefits and protect the public interest, and enforcement may also serve the self-interest of the institutions that oversee enforcement. Enforcement can be effectuated by both public institutions and private, non-governmental actors. Enforcement is often accomplished through coercive means or by utilizing power disparities to constrain action. Some scholars, such as Kate Andrias, have also argued that institutions enforce rules when deciding "when and how to apply" laws and regulations.

=== Delegation of enforcement powers ===
Some governments will delegate enforcement powers to subordinate governmental entities or private parties. In the United States, for example, the federal government and state governments often delegate a range of enforcement powers to administrative agencies. There has been considerable debate in legal scholarship about the degree to which governments should oversee and supervise institutions to which enforcement powers have been delegated.

== Enforcement mechanisms ==
Enforcement mechanisms are a central part of various policies. Enforcement mechanisms co-determine natural resource governance outcomes and pollution-related policies may require proper enforcement mechanisms (and often substitutes) to have a positive effect. Enforcement may include law enforcement or combine incentive and disincentive-based policy instruments. A meta-analysis of policy studies across multiple policy domains suggests enforcement mechanisms are the "only modifiable treaty design choice" with the potential to improve the mostly low effectiveness of international treaties.

In 2017, of 265 policies for ocean protection only 13% had specific enforcement mechanisms.

Enforcement mechanisms are major component of governance structures. It has been suggested that an effective global public health security convention would require a governing body (or bodies) to enforce the framework with appropriate enforcement mechanisms. Similar approaches include the concept of "climate clubs" of polities for climate change mitigation. In such, "border adjustments [...] have to be introduced to target those states that do not participate [...] to avoid shifting effects with ecologically and economically detrimental consequences", with such "border adjustments or eco-tariffs" incentivizing other countries to adjust their standards and domestic production to join the climate club. The Paris Agreement may lack enforcement mechanisms.

On a national level, penalties for non-complying countries could include:

- public reprimands
- economic sanctions
- denial of benefits, such as those related to travel, trade, and tourism
- public disclosures of compliance, which could act either as an incentive or penalty
- tariffs

Benefits for countries could include:

- tangible resources, such as financial aid or technical assistance
- other support
- access to data and information, recommendations and guidance, or other services provided by a governing body
- tariffs

== Selective enforcement ==
Institutions may choose to exercise discretion, thereby enforcing laws, regulations, or norms only in selective circumstances. Some scholars, such as Joseph H. Tieger, have suggested that selective enforcement is an inherent component of all enforcement regimes, because it is impossible for enforcers to observe and catch every violation. Other scholars, such as Margaret H. Lemos and Alex Stein, have suggested that "strategic" enforcement is a cost-effective method of achieving social benefits; by focusing enforcement on the worst violators, other violators will "downscale" their activities so that they do not appear to be the worst offender.

== See also ==
- Law enforcement
- Primary and secondary legislation
- State capacity
