= Saikrishna Prakash =

American law professor

- Born: Saikrishna Bangalore Prakash

Academic background
- Education: Stanford University (BA); Yale University (JD)

Academic work
- Discipline: Law
- Sub-discipline: United States constitutional law
- Institutions: University of San Diego School of Law; University of Virginia School of Law

Saikrishna Bangalore Prakash is an American legal scholar who holds the James Monroe Distinguished Professorship of Law and the Horace W. Goldsmith Research Professorship of Law at the University of Virginia School of Law. Prakash is also a Senior Fellow at the Miller Center of Public Affairs. He studied economics and political science at Stanford University and earned his J.D. degree from Yale Law School, where he was awarded the John M. Olin Fellowship in Law, Economics and Public Policy and was senior editor of the Yale Law Journal.

Prakash clerked for Clarence Thomas of the Supreme Court of the United States and Judge Laurence H. Silberman of the United States Court of Appeals for the District of Columbia Circuit. He previously served as the Herzog Research Professor of Law at the University of San Diego School of Law. He was elected to the American Law Institute in 2017 and served as the Michael Doyle and Bunny Winter Distinguished Visiting professor of law at Yale Law School in the fall 2022 term.

== Publications ==
=== Books ===
- Prakash, Saikrishna Bangalore (2015). Imperial from the Beginning: The Constitution of the Original Executive. New Haven, CT: Yale University Press. ISBN 9780300194562.
- Prakash, Saikrishna Bangalore (2020). The Living Presidency: An Originalist Argument against Its Ever-Expanding Powers. Cambridge, MA: Harvard University Belknap Press. ISBN 9780674987982.
- Prakash, Saikrishna Bangalore (2026). The Presidential Pardon: The Short Clause with a Long, Troubled History. Cambridge, MA: Harvard University Press. ISBN 9780674303201.

=== Selected Articles ===
- — (1993). "Field Office Federalism". Virginia Law Review. 79 (8): 1957–2037. JSTOR 1073477.
- —; Calabresi, Steven G. (1994). "The President's Power to Execute the Laws". Yale Law Journal. 104 (3): 541–666. JSTOR 797113.
- —; Ramsey, Michael D. (2001). "The Executive Power over Foreign Affairs". Yale Law Journal. 111 (2): 231–356. JSTOR 797591.
- — (2003). "The Essential Meaning of Executive Power". University of Illinois Law Review. 2003 (3): 701—820.
- —; Yoo, John C. (2003). "The Origins of Judicial Review". University of Chicago Law Review. 70 (3): 887—982. JSTOR 1600662.
- —; Alexander, Larry (2003). "Reports of the Nondelegation Doctrine's Death Are Greatly Exaggerated". University of Chicago Law Review. 70 (4): 1297—1330. JSTOR 1600575.
- — (2006). "New Light on the Decision of 1789". Cornell Law Review. 91 (5):1021—1078.
- — (2006). "Removal and Tenure in Office". Virginia Law Review. 92 (8): 1779—1852. JSTOR 4144971.
- —; Devins, Neal (2012) "The Indefensible Duty to Defend". Columbia Law Review. 112 (3): 507—577. JSTOR 23238439.
- — (2013). "The Imbecilic Executive". Virginia Law Review. 99 (7): 1361 —1433. JSTOR 23528453.
- —; Devins, Neal (2015). "Fifty States, Fifty Attorneys General, and Fifty Approaches to the Duty to Defend". Yale Law Journal. 124 (6): 2100—2188. JSTOR 43617076.
- — (2015). "The Sweeping Domestic War Powers of Congress". Michigan Law Review. 113 (8): 1337—1396. JSTOR 24770828.
- — (2018). "Congress as Elephant". Virginia Law Review. 104 (4): 797—842. JSTOR 44863416.
- — (2019). "Speaking with a Different Voice: Why the Military Trial of Civilians and the Enemy is Constitutional". California Law Review. 107 (3): 1021—1042. JSTOR 26756595.
- — (2019). "Of Synchronicity and Supreme Law". Harvard Law Review. 132 (4): 1220—1300. JSTOR 26799834.
- — (2020). "Against Constitution by Convention". California Law Review. 108 (6): 1975—1994. JSTOR 26977953.
- —; Bamzai, Aditya (2023). "The Executive Power of Removal". Harvard Law Review. 136 (7): 1756—1844.
- — (2023). "Deciphering the Commander-in-Chief Clause". Yale Law Journal. 133 (1): 1—98.
- — (2025). "The Fearless Executive, Crime, and the Separation of Powers". Virginia Law Review. 111 (1): 1—66.
- —; Sunstein, Cass R. (2025). "Radical Constitutional Change". Virginia Law Review. 111 (6): 1109—1186.
- — (2025). "Spirit". University of Pennsylvania Law Review. 173 (4): 937—1028.
- — (2026). "The Inconvenience Doctrine". Stanford Law Review. 76 (1): 1—62.
