= John Yoo =

American legal scholar (born 1967)

- 유준
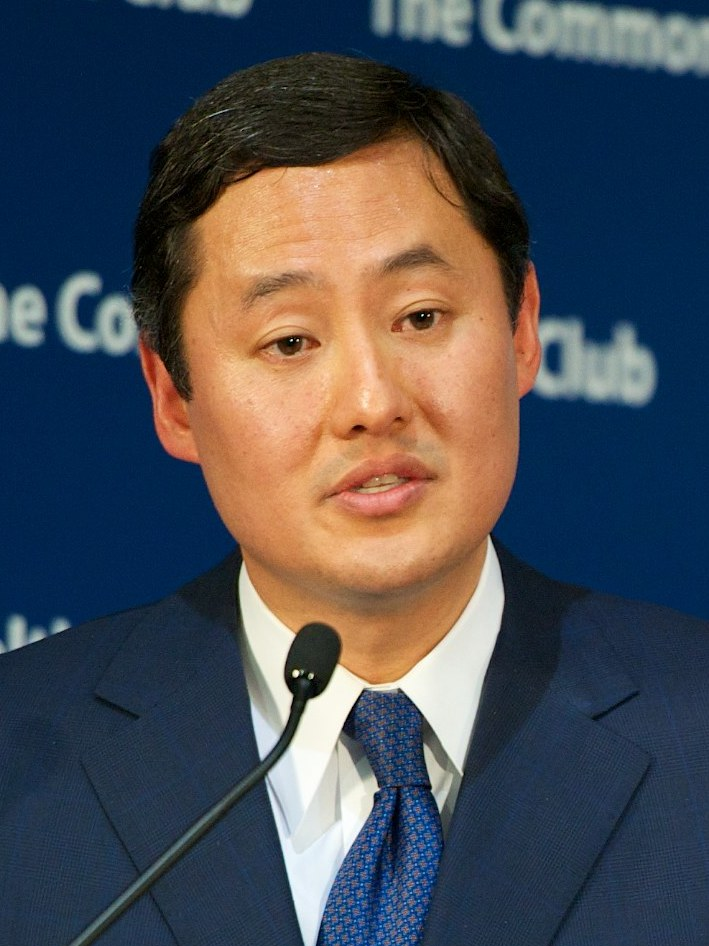
- Yoo in 2012

Deputy Assistant Attorney General for the Office of Legal Counsel
- In office July 2001 – May 2003
- Appointed by: Jay S. Bybee
- President: George W. Bush

Personal details
- Born: Yoo Choon; July 10, 1967 (age 59) Seoul, South Korea
- Party: Republican
- Spouse: Elsa Arnett
- Education: Harvard University (BA); Yale University (JD)
- Occupation: Law professor
- Known for: "Torture Memos" (2002)
- Awards: Federalist Society Paul M. Bator Award (2001)

Korean name
- Hangul: 유준
- RR: Yu Jun
- MR: Yu Chun

John Choon Yoo (Korean: 유준; born July 10, 1967) is an American legal scholar and former government official who is the Emanuel S. Heller Professor of Law at the University of California, Berkeley. While serving in the George W. Bush administration, he became known for his legal opinions concerning executive power, warrantless wiretapping, and the Geneva Conventions.

Yoo was the author of the controversial "Torture Memos" in the war on terror. As the deputy assistant attorney general in the Office of Legal Counsel (OLC) of the Department of Justice, Yoo wrote the Torture Memos to determine the legal limits for the torture of detainees following the September 11 attacks. The legal guidance on interrogation authored by Yoo and his successors in the OLC were rescinded by President Barack Obama in 2009. Some called for investigating and prosecuting Yoo under various anti-torture and anti-war crimes statutes.

A report by the Justice Department's Office of Professional Responsibility stated that Yoo's justification of waterboarding and other "enhanced interrogation methods" constituted "intentional professional misconduct" and recommended that Yoo be referred to his state bar association for possible disciplinary proceedings. Senior Justice Department lawyer David Margolis overruled the report in 2010, saying that Yoo and Assistant Attorney General Jay Bybee—who authorized the memos—had exercised "poor judgment" but that the department lacked a clear standard to conclude misconduct.

== Early life and education ==
Yoo was born on July 10, 1967, in Seoul, South Korea. His parents, who were teenagers during the Korean War, became medical doctors before moving to the United States when Yoo was three months old. Because of their experience as war refugees, Yoo's parents were anti-communist.

After immigrating to the United States with his family as an infant, Yoo grew up in Philadelphia, Pennsylvania. He graduated from Episcopal Academy in 1985. He then attended Harvard University, where he studied American history and became the deputy editorial chairman of The Harvard Crimson. He wrote his senior thesis on the foreign policy of presidents Dwight D. Eisenhower, John F. Kennedy, and Lyndon B. Johnson under the supervision of historian Brian Balogh.

In 1989, Yoo graduated from Harvard College with a Bachelor of Arts, summa cum laude, with membership in Phi Beta Kappa, and won the college's Washburn Prize and Detur Prize for academic achievement. He then enrolled at Yale Law School, where he became an editor of The Yale Law Journal, and earned a Juris Doctor (J.D.) in 1992.

== Career ==
=== Early legal service ===
After law school, Yoo was a law clerk to Judge Laurence H. Silberman of the U.S. Court of Appeals for the District of Columbia Circuit from 1992 to 1993 and to Justice Clarence Thomas of the U.S. Supreme Court from 1994 to 1995. He served as general counsel of the Senate Judiciary Committee from 1995 to 1996.

=== Academic career ===
Since 1993, Yoo has been a professor at the University of California, Berkeley, School of Law, where he is the Emanuel S. Heller Professor of Law. He has written multiple books on presidential power and the war on terrorism, and many articles in scholarly journals and newspapers. He has held the Fulbright Distinguished Chair in Law at the University of Trento and has been a visiting law professor at the Free University of Amsterdam, the University of Chicago, and Chapman University School of Law. Since 2003, Yoo has also been a visiting scholar at the American Enterprise Institute, a conservative think tank in Washington. He wrote a monthly column, "Closing Arguments", for The Philadelphia Inquirer. He has written academic books including Crisis and Command.

=== Bush administration (2001–2003) ===
Yoo has been principally associated with his work from 2001 to 2003 in the Department of Justice's Office of Legal Counsel (OLC) under Attorney General John Ashcroft during the George W. Bush Administration. Yoo's expansive view of presidential power led to a close relationship with Vice President Dick Cheney's office. He played an important role in developing a legal justification for the Bush administration's policy in the war on terrorism, arguing that prisoner of war status under the Geneva Conventions does not apply to "enemy combatants" captured during the war in Afghanistan and held at the Guantánamo Bay detention camp.

==== Torture memos ====
In what was originally known as the Bybee memo, Yoo asserted that executive authority during wartime allows waterboarding and other forms of torture, which were euphemistically referred to as "enhanced interrogation techniques" were issued to the CIA. Yoo's memos narrowly defined torture and American habeas corpus obligations. Yoo argued in his legal opinion that the president was not bound by the American War Crimes Act of 1996. Yoo's legal opinions were not shared by everyone within the Bush Administration. Secretary of State Colin Powell strongly opposed what he saw as an invalidation of the Geneva Conventions, while U.S. Navy general counsel Alberto Mora campaigned internally against what he saw as the "catastrophically poor legal reasoning" and dangerous extremism of Yoo's opinions. In December 2003, Yoo's memo on permissible interrogation techniques was repudiated as legally unsound by the OLC, then under the direction of Jack Goldsmith.

In June 2004, another of Yoo's memos on interrogation techniques was leaked to the press, after which it was repudiated by Goldsmith and the OLC. On March 14, 2003, Yoo wrote a legal opinion memo in response to the General Counsel of the Department of Defense, in which he concluded that torture not allowed by federal law could be used by interrogators in overseas areas. Yoo cited an 1873 Supreme Court ruling, on the Modoc Indian Prisoners, where the Supreme Court had ruled that Modoc Indians were not lawful combatants, so they could be shot, on sight, to justify his assertion that individuals apprehended in Afghanistan could be tortured.

Yoo's contribution to these memos has remained a source of controversy following his departure from the Justice Department; he was called to testify before the House Judiciary Committee in 2008 in defense of his role. The Justice Department's Office of Professional Responsibility (OPR) began investigating Yoo's work in 2004 and in July 2009 completed a report that was sharply critical of his legal justification for waterboarding and other interrogation techniques. The OPR report cites testimony Yoo gave to Justice Department investigators in which he claims that the "president's war-making authority was so broad that he had the constitutional power to order a village to be 'massacred.'" The OPR report concluded that Yoo had "committed 'intentional professional misconduct' when he advised the CIA it could proceed with waterboarding and other aggressive interrogation techniques against Al Qaeda suspects," although the recommendation that he be referred to his state bar association for possible disciplinary proceedings was overruled by David Margolis, another senior Justice department lawyer.

In 2009, President Barack Obama issued Executive Order 13491, rescinding the legal guidance on interrogation authored by Yoo and his successors in the Office of Legal Counsel.

In December 2005, Doug Cassel, a law professor from the University of Notre Dame, asked Yoo, "If the President deems that he's got to torture somebody, including by crushing the testicles of the person's child, there is no law that can stop him?", to which Yoo replied, "No treaty." Cassel followed up with "Also no law by Congress—that is what you wrote in the August 2002 memo," to which Yoo replied, "I think it depends on why the President thinks he needs to do that."

==== War crimes accusations ====
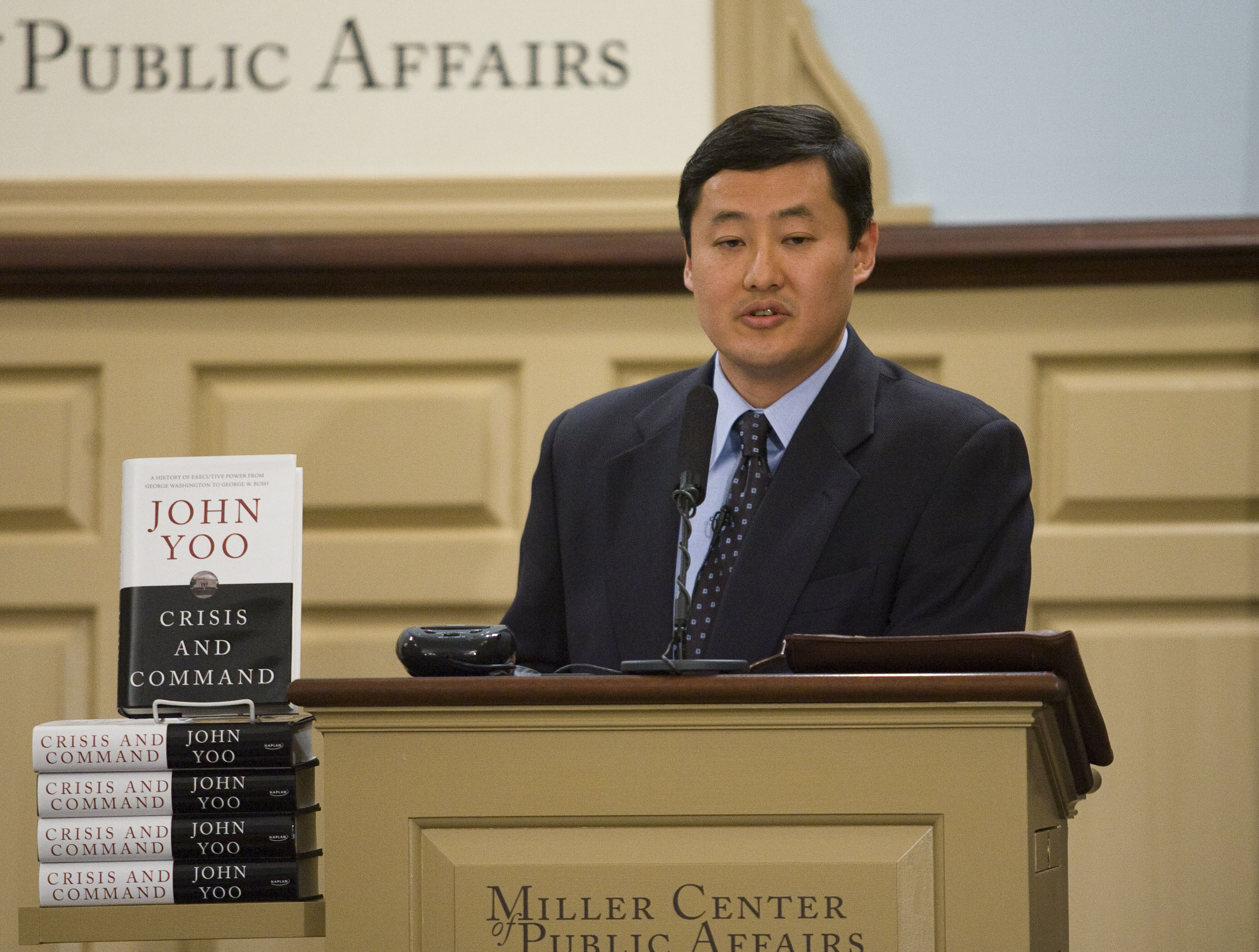
Yoo at the Miller Center on March 19, 2010

Criminal proceedings against Yoo have begun in Spain: in a move that could have led to an extradition request, Judge Baltasar Garzón in March 2009 referred a case against Yoo to the chief prosecutor. The Spanish Attorney General recommended against pursuing the case.

On November 14, 2006, invoking the principle of command responsibility, the German attorney Wolfgang Kaleck filed a complaint with the Attorney General of Germany (Generalbundesanwalt) against Yoo, along with 13 others, for his alleged complicity in torture and other crimes against humanity at Abu Ghraib in Iraq and Guantánamo Bay. Kaleck acted on behalf of 11 alleged victims of torture and other human rights abuses, as well as about 30 human rights activists and organizations. The co-plaintiffs to the war crimes prosecution included Adolfo Pérez Esquivel, Martín Almada, Theo van Boven, Sister Dianna Ortiz, and Veterans for Peace. Responding to the so-called "torture memoranda," Scott Horton noted

the possibility that the authors of these memoranda counseled the use of lethal and unlawful techniques, and therefore face criminal culpability themselves. That, after all, is the teaching of United States v. Altstötter, the Nuremberg case brought against German Justice Department lawyers whose memoranda crafted the basis for implementation of the infamous 'Night and Fog Decree'.

Legal scholars speculated shortly thereafter that the case has little chance of successfully making it through the German court system.

Jordan Paust of the University of Houston Law Center concurred with supporters of prosecution and in early 2008 criticized the US Attorney General Michael Mukasey's refusal to investigate and/or prosecute anyone who relied on these legal opinions:

[I]t is legally and morally impossible for any member of the executive branch to be acting lawfully or within the scope of his or her authority while following OLC opinions that are manifestly inconsistent with or violative of the law. General Mukasey, just following orders is no defense!

In 2009, the Spanish Judge Baltasar Garzón Real launched an investigation of Yoo and five others (known as the Bush Six) for war crimes.

On April 13, 2013, the Russian Federation banned Yoo and several others from entering the country because of alleged human rights violations. The list was a direct response to the so-called Magnitsky list revealed by the United States the day before. Russia stated that Yoo was among those responsible for "the legalization of torture" and "unlimited detention".

After the December 2014 release of the executive summary of the Senate Intelligence Committee report on CIA torture, Erwin Chemerinsky, then the dean of the University of California, Irvine School of Law, called for the prosecution of Yoo for his role in authoring the Torture Memos as "conspiracy to violate a federal statute".

On May 12, 2012, the Kuala Lumpur War Crimes Commission found Yoo, along with former President Bush, former Vice President Cheney, and several other senior members of the Bush administration, guilty of war crimes in absentia. The trial heard "harrowing witness accounts from victims of torture who suffered at the hands of US soldiers and contractors in Iraq and Afghanistan".

==== Warrantless wiretapping ====
Yoo provided a legal opinion backing the Bush Administration's warrantless wiretapping program. Yoo authored the October 23, 2001 memo asserting that the President had sufficient power to allow the NSA to monitor the communications of US citizens on US soil without a warrant (known as the warrantless wiretap program) because the Fourth Amendment does not apply. As another memo says in a footnote, "Our office recently concluded that the Fourth Amendment had no application to domestic military operations." That interpretation is used to assert that the normal mandatory requirement of a warrant, under the Foreign Intelligence Surveillance Act, could be ignored.

In a 2006 book and a 2007 law review article, Yoo defended President Bush's terrorist surveillance program, arguing that "the TSP represents a valid exercise of the President's Commander-in-Chief authority to gather intelligence during wartime". He claimed that critics of the program misunderstand the separation of powers between the President and Congress in wartime because of a failure to understand the differences between war and crime, and a difficulty in understanding the new challenges presented by a networked, dynamic enemy such as Al Qaeda. "Because the United States is at war with Al Qaeda, the President possesses the constitutional authority as Commander-in-Chief to engage in warrantless surveillance of enemy activity." In a Wall Street Journal opinion piece in July 2009, Yoo wrote it was "absurd to think that a law like FISA should restrict live military operations against potential attacks on the United States."

=== National Board for Education Sciences (2020–) ===
In December 2020, President Donald Trump appointed Yoo to a four-year term on the National Board for Education Sciences, which advises the Department of Education on scientific research and investments.

=== "Grand Conspiracy" Investigation ===
In 2025, he joined the "Grand Conspiracy" investigation under Joseph diGenova to enact legal revenge against perceived enemies of Donald Trump.

== Commentary ==
=== Unitary executive theory ===
Yoo suggested that since the primary task of the President during a time of war is protecting U.S. citizens, the President has inherent authority to subordinate independent government agencies, and plenary power to use force abroad. Yoo contends that the Congressional check on Presidential war-making power comes from its power of the purse. He says that the President, and not the Congress or courts, has sole authority to interpret international treaties such as the Geneva Conventions, "because treaty interpretation is a key feature of the conduct of foreign affairs". His positions on executive power are controversial because the theory can be interpreted as holding that the President's war powers afford him executive privileges which exceed the bounds which other scholars associate with the President's war powers. His positions on the unitary executive are controversial as well because they are seen as an excuse to advance a conservative deregulatory agenda; the unitary executive theory says that every president is able to roll back any regulation passed by previous presidents, and it came to prominence in the Reagan administration as a "legal strategy that could enable the administration to gain control of the independent regulatory agencies that were seen as impeding the...agenda of deregulating business."

Following his tenure as an appointee of the George W. Bush administration, Yoo criticized certain views on the separation of powers doctrine as allegedly being historically inaccurate and problematic for the global war on terrorism. For instance, he wrote, "We are used to a peacetime system in which Congress enacts the laws, the president enforces them, and the courts interpret them. In wartime, the gravity shifts to the executive branch."

In 1998 Yoo criticized what he characterized as an imperial use of executive power by the Clinton administration. In an opinion piece in the WSJ, he argued that the Clinton administration misused the privilege to protect the personal, rather than official, activities of the President, such as in the Monica Lewinsky affair. At the time, Yoo also criticized Clinton for contemplating defiance of a judicial order. He suggested that Presidents could act in conflict with the Supreme Court, but that such measures were justified only during emergencies. In 2000 Yoo strongly criticized what he viewed as the Clinton administration's use of powers of what he termed the "Imperial Presidency". He said it undermined "democratic accountability and respect for the law". Yet, Yoo has defended Clinton for his decision to use force abroad without congressional authorization. He wrote in The Wall Street Journal on March 15, 1999, that Clinton's decision to attack Serbia was constitutional. He then criticized Democrats in Congress for not suing Clinton as they had sued presidents Bush and Reagan to stop the use of force abroad.

=== Trump administration ===
In 2019, on Fox News, Yoo made the comment "Some might call that espionage" when discussing Lt. Col. Alexander Vindman, the top Ukraine expert on the National Security Council. Vindman was set to testify in front of Congress the next day about Trump requesting that the Ukrainian president start an investigation into his political rival Joe Biden. Yoo subsequently said "I really regret the choice of words" and that he had been referring to Ukrainian officials rather than Vindman.

In 2020, Yoo praised Trump as a "constitutional conservative". He wrote a 2020 book about Trump titled Defender in Chief: Donald Trump's Fight for Presidential Power. During an interview on C-SPAN in August 2020, Yoo defended the use of enhanced executive privilege within the Trump administration. He stated in a concurrent interview on CBS with Ted Koppel that his support for Trump may be guided by his possible reading of PEADs (Presidential Emergency Action Documents) as further supplementing his support for enhanced executive privilege during wartime and other national emergencies.

After Trump lost his bid for re-election in the 2020 United States presidential election, Yoo stated in an opinion piece that the Supreme Court could decide the outcome of the election. Weeks later, Yoo and J. Michael Luttig advised Mike Pence that the Vice President had no constitutional authority to interfere with the certification of Electoral College votes on January 6, 2021, as had been proposed to Pence by Trump attorney John Eastman.

=== Proposed reciprocal prosecutions ===
At a July 2024 National Conservatism Conference meeting, former Donald Trump attorney John Eastman, who also clerked for Justice Clarence Thomas, had been disbarred and was facing prosecution for his alleged role in the Pence card conspiracy to overturn the 2020 presidential election results, remarked, "We've got to start impeaching these judges for acting in such an unbelievably partisan way from the bench." Yoo responded, "People who have used this tool against people like John or President Trump have to be prosecuted by Republican or conservative DAs in exactly the same way, for exactly the same kinds of things, until they stop."

== Federal tort suit ==
On January 4, 2008, José Padilla, a U.S. citizen convicted of terrorism, and his mother sued John Yoo in the U.S. District Court, Northern District of California (Case Number 08-cv-00035-JSW), known as Padilla v. Yoo. The complaint sought $1 in damages based on the alleged torture of Padilla, attributed to the authorization by Yoo's torture memoranda. Judge Jeffrey White allowed the suit to proceed, rejecting all but one of Yoo's immunity claims. Padilla's lawyer says White's ruling could have a broad effect for all detainees.

Soon after his appointment in October 2003 as chief of the Office of Legal Counsel, DOJ, Jack Goldsmith withdrew Yoo's torture memoranda. The Padilla complaint, on page 20, cited Goldsmith's 2007 book The Terror Presidency in support of its case. In it Goldsmith had claimed that the legal analysis in Yoo's torture memoranda was incorrect and that there was widespread opposition to the memoranda among some lawyers in the Justice Department. Padilla's attorney used this information in the lawsuit, saying that Yoo caused Padilla's damages by authorizing his alleged torture by his memoranda.

While the District Court ruled in favor of Padilla, the case was appealed by Yoo in June 2010. On May 2, 2012, the Ninth Circuit Court of Appeals held that Yoo had qualified immunity at the time of his memos (2001–2003), because certain issues had not then been settled legally by the U.S. Supreme Court. Based on the Supreme Court's decision in Ashcroft v. al-Kidd (2011), the Appeals Court unanimously ruled against Padilla, saying that, when he was held as a detainee, it had not been established that an enemy combatant had the "same constitutional protections" as a convicted prisoner or suspect, and that his treatment had not been legally established at the time as torture.

Retired Colonel Lawrence Wilkerson, chief of staff to General Colin Powell in the Persian Gulf War and while Powell was Secretary of State in the Bush Administration, has said of Yoo and other administration figures responsible for these decisions:

Haynes, Feith, Yoo, Bybee, Gonzales and—at the apex—Addington, should never travel outside the US, except perhaps to Saudi Arabia and Israel. They broke the law; they violated their professional ethical code. In the future, some government may build the case necessary to prosecute them in a foreign court, or in an international court.

== Office of Professional Responsibility report ==
The Department of Justice's Office of Professional Responsibility concluded in a 261-page report in July 2009 that Yoo committed "intentional professional misconduct" when he "knowingly failed to provide a thorough, objective, and candid interpretation of the law", and it recommended a referral to the Pennsylvania Bar for disciplinary action. But David Margolis, a career Justice attorney, countermanded the recommended referral in a January 2010 memorandum. While Margolis was careful to avoid "an endorsement of the legal work", which he said was "flawed" and "contained errors more than minor", concluding that Yoo had exercised "poor judgment", he did not find "professional misconduct" sufficient to authorize OPR "to refer its findings to the state bar disciplinary authorities".

Yoo contended that the OPR had shown "rank bias and sheer incompetence", intended to "smear my reputation", and that Margolis "completely rejected its recommendations".

Although stopping short of referral to the bar, Margolis had also written:

[Yoo's and Bybee's] memoranda represent an unfortunate chapter in the history of the Office of Legal Counsel. While I have declined to adopt OPR's findings of misconduct, I fear that John Yoo's loyalty to his own ideology and convictions clouded his view of his obligation to his client and led him to author opinions which reflected his own extreme, although sincerely held, views of executive power while speaking for an institutional client.

Margolis's decision not to refer Yoo to the bar for discipline was criticized by numerous commentators.

== Publications ==
Yoo's writings and areas of interest have fallen into three broad areas: American foreign relations; the Constitution's separation of powers and federalism; and international law. In foreign relations, Yoo has argued that the original understanding of the Constitution gives the President the authority to use armed force abroad without congressional authorization, subject to Congress's power of the purse; that treaties do not generally have domestic legal force without implementing legislation; and that courts are functionally ill-suited to intervene in foreign policy disputes between the President and Congress.

With the separation of powers, Yoo has argued that each branch of government has the authority to interpret the Constitution for itself. In international law, Yoo has written that the rules governing the use of force must be understood to allow nations to engage in armed intervention to end humanitarian disasters, rebuild failed states, and stop terrorism and the proliferation of weapons of mass destruction.

Yoo's academic work includes his analysis of the history of judicial review in the U.S. Constitution. Yoo's book, The Powers of War and Peace: The Constitution and Foreign Affairs after 9/11, was praised in an Op-Ed in The Washington Times, written by Nicholas J. Xenakis, an assistant editor at The National Interest. It was quoted by Senator Joe Biden during the Senate hearings for then-U.S. Supreme Court nominee Samuel Alito, as Biden "pressed Alito to denounce John Yoo's controversial defense of presidential initiative in taking the nation to war". Yoo is known as an opponent of the Chemical Weapons Convention.

During 2012 and 2014, Yoo published two books with Oxford University Press. Taming Globalization was co-authored with Julian Ku in 2012, and Point of Attack was published under his single authorship in 2014. His 2017 book Striking Power: How Cyber, Robots, and Space Weapons Change the Rules for War is co-authored with by Jeremy Rabkin.

Yoo's latest book, Defender in Chief: Donald Trump's Fight for Presidential Power, was published in July 2020.

== Personal life ==
Yoo is married to Elsa Arnett, the daughter of journalist Peter Arnett.

== In popular culture ==
- In Vice, a 2018 biographical comedy-drama film about Dick Cheney, Yoo is portrayed by Paul Yoo.
- In The Report, a 2019 film about the Senate Intelligence Committee report on CIA torture, Yoo is portrayed by Pun Bandhu.

== Selected works ==
=== Books ===
- Yoo, John (2005). The Powers of War and Peace: The Constitution and Foreign Affairs after 9/11. University of Chicago Press. ISBN 978-0-226-96033-3.
- — (2006). War by Other Means: An Insider's Account of the War on Terror. Atlantic Monthly Press. ISBN 978-1-55584-763-0.
- — (2010). Crisis and Command: A History of Executive Power from George Washington to George W. Bush. Kaplan Publishing. ISBN 978-1-60714-555-4.
- Ku, Julian; — (2012). Taming Globalization: International Law, the U.S. Constitution, and the New World Order (co-author Julian Ku). Oxford University Press. ISBN 978-0-19-983742-7. Archived from the original on January 31, 2021.
- — (2014). Point of Attack: Preventive War, International Law, and Global Welfare. Oxford University Press. ISBN 978-0-19-934776-6. Archived from the original on January 31, 2021.
- Rabkin, Jeremy; — (2017). Striking Power: How Cyber, Robots, and Space Weapons Change the Rules for War. Encounter Books. ISBN 978-1-59403-888-4.
- — (July 28, 2020). Defender in Chief: Donald Trump's Fight for Presidential Power. St. Martin's Publishing Group. ISBN 978-1-250-26961-4. Archived from the original on January 31, 2021.

=== Articles ===
- Yoo, John C. (1996). "The Continuation of Politics by Other Means: The Original Understanding of War Powers". California Law Review. 84 (2): 167–306. JSTOR 3480925.
- — (1996). "Who Measures the Chancellor's Foot? The Inherent Remedial Authority of the Federal Courts". California Law Review. 84 (4): 1121–78. JSTOR 3480990.
- — (1997). "The Judicial Safeguards of Federalism". Southern California Law Review. 70 (5): 1311–1406.
- — (1999). "Globalism and the Constitution: Treaties, Non Self-Execution, and the Original Understanding". Columbia Law Review. 99 (8): 1955–2094. JSTOR 1123607.
- — (2002). "War and the Constitutional Text". University of Chicago Law Review. 69 (4): 1639–84.
- —; Prakash, Saikrishna B. (2003). "The Origins of Judicial Review". University of Chicago Law Review. 70 (3): 887–982.
- — (2003). "International Law and the War in Iraq". American Journal of International Law. 97 (3): 563–76. JSTOR 3109841.
- —; Prakash, Saikrishna B. (2005). "The Puzzling Persistence of Process-Based Federalism Theories". Texas Law Review. 93 (1): 1–74.
- —; Posner, Eric A. (2005). "Judicial Independence in International Tribunals". California Law Review. 93 (1): 1–74.
- —; Delahunty, Robert J. (2013). "Dream On: The Obama Administration's Nonenforcement of Immigration Laws, the DREAM Act, and the Take Care Clause" (PDF). Texas Law Review. 91 (4): 781–858.

== See also ==
- Extraordinary rendition by the United States
- List of law clerks for the tenth seat of the Supreme Court of the United States
- U.S. Army and CIA interrogation manuals
