= William Baude =

American legal scholar

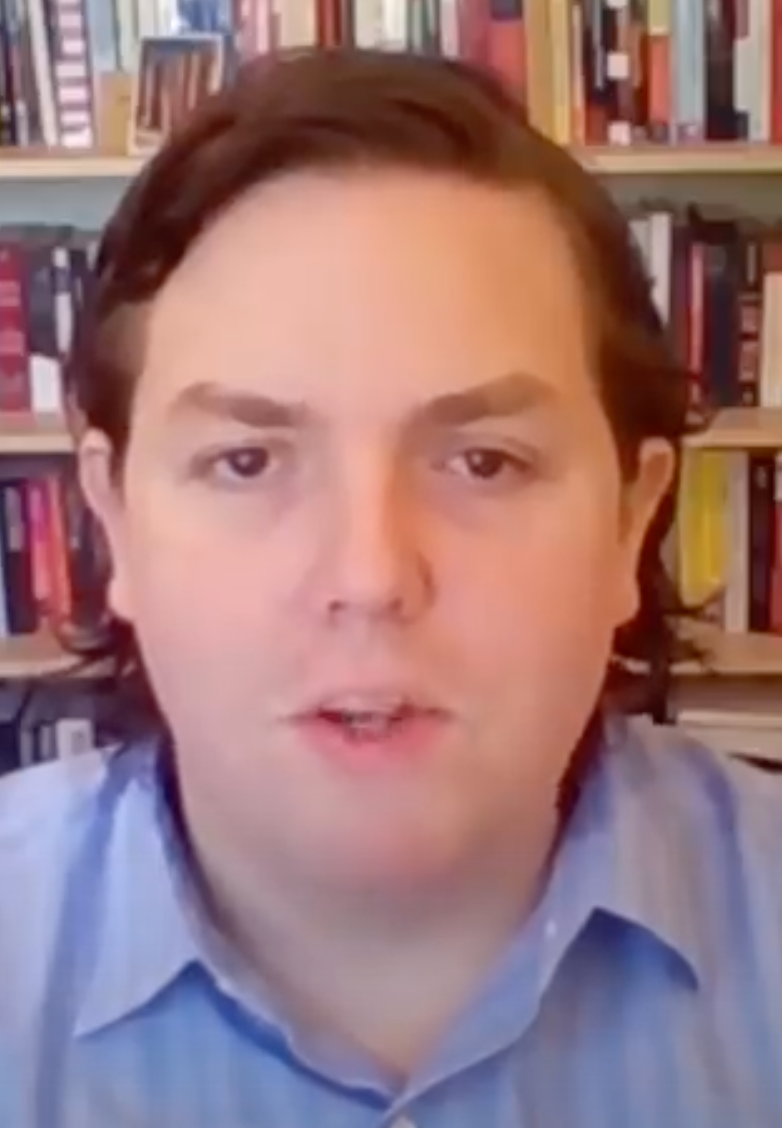
- Known for: Coining "shadow docket"
- Title: Harry Kalven Jr. Professor of Law

Academic background
- Education: University of Chicago (BS); Yale University (JD)
- Influences: Michael W. McConnell; John Roberts; Antonin Scalia

Academic work
- Discipline: Constitutional law
- Institutions: Stanford University; University of Chicago

William Patrick Baude (/boʊd/) is an American legal scholar known for his studies of U.S. constitutional law. He has been a professor at the University of Chicago Law School since 2014. In 2023, he was named the Harry Kalven Jr. Professor of Law. He founded the Constitutional Law Institute at the law school in 2020.

Baude became known for coining the term "shadow docket" in 2015 to describe a practice of the Supreme Court of the United States.

== Early life and education ==
Baude is the son of Patrick L. Baude (1943–2011) and Julia C. Lamber (1947–), who were professors at the Indiana University Maurer School of Law from 1968 to 2008.

Baude graduated from the University of Chicago, where he was a member of Sigma Xi, in 2004 with a Bachelor of Science degree in mathematics. He then attended Yale Law School, where he was an articles and essay editor of the Yale Law Journal. He graduated in 2007 with a Juris Doctor.

== Career ==
=== Legal practice ===
After graduating from law school, Baude was a law clerk to Judge Michael W. McConnell of the U.S. Court of Appeals for the Tenth Circuit from 2007 to 2008 and to Chief Justice John Roberts of the U.S. Supreme Court from 2008 to 2009.

From 2009 to 2011, Baude was an associate at the Washington, D.C. law firm Robbins, Russell, Englert, Orseck, Untereiner & Sauber LLP (now part of Kramer Levin Naftalis & Frankel).

=== Academics ===
Baude was as a fellow at the Constitutional Law Center at Stanford Law School from 2011 to 2013. He was a summer fellow at the Center for the Study of Constitutional Originalism at the University of San Diego Law School during the summers of 2012 and 2013.

Baude joined the faculty of the University of Chicago Law School as the Neubauer Family Assistant Professor of Law in 2014. He was named Professor of Law in 2018 and Harry Kalven, Jr. Professor of Law in 2023. He teaches constitutional law, federal courts, and conflicts of law. In 2020, he founded the Constitutional Law Institute at the law school and serves as the institute's founding director.

Baude coined the term "shadow docket" in 2015 to describe actions taken by the United States Supreme Court outside its regular, fully briefed and argued cases.

=== Social engagement ===
Baude is a co-editor of the University Casebook Series' The Constitution of the United States (4th ed., 2021). and has written on originalism in the United States Constitution. Baude is among the most cited active scholars of constitutional law in the United States.

Baude writes for the Volokh Conspiracy blog, and has contributed to the New York Times and the Chicago Tribune. He also co-hosts a podcast, Divided Argument, with law professor Daniel Epps on which they discuss recent Supreme Court decisions.

On April 9, 2021, Baude, together with fellow faculty members David A. Strauss and Alison LaCroix at the University of Chicago Law School, was appointed by United States President Joe Biden to the Presidential Commission on the Supreme Court of the United States. On December 12, 2022, Baude wrote to Senator Dick Durbin, chairman of the Senate Judiciary Committee, to support the nomination of P. Casey Pitts to serve as a United States district judge of the United States District Court for the Northern District of California.

In August 2023, Baude and legal scholar Michael Stokes Paulsen released an article entitled "The Sweep and Force of Section Three", later published in the University of Pennsylvania Law Review, arguing that Section Three of the Fourteenth Amendment to the United States Constitution disqualified Donald Trump from holding political office in the United States because of his participation in the attempt to overturn the election of Joe Biden as president.

Baude is an elected member of the American Law Institute. He received the Paul M. Bator Award by the Federalist Society in 2017.

== Selected works ==
- Baude, William (2008). "The Judgment Power". Georgetown Law Journal. 96 (6): 1807–62.
- — (2013). "Rethinking the Federal Eminent Domain Power". Yale Law Journal. 122 (7): 1738–1825. JSTOR 23528864.
- — (2015). "Foreword: The Supreme Court's Shadow Docket". New York University Journal of Law & Liberty. 9 (1): 1–47.
- — (2015). "Is Originalism Our Law?". Columbia Law Review. 115 (8): 2349–2408. JSTOR 43655765.
- —; Stern, James Y. (2016). "The Positive Law Model of the Fourth Amendment". Harvard Law Review. 129 (7): 1821–89. JSTOR 44072348.
- —; Sachs, Stephen E. (2017). "The Law of Interpretation". Harvard Law Review. 130 (4): 1079–1147. JSTOR 44865509.
- — (2018). "Is Qualified Immunity Unlawful?". California Law Review. 106 (1): 45–90. JSTOR 44630786.
- — (2019). "Constitutional Liquidation". Stanford Law Review. 71 (1): 1–70.
- — (2020). "Adjudication Outside Article III". Harvard Law Review. 133 (5): 1511–81. JSTOR 26900281.
- — (2023). "Severability First Principles". Virginia Law Review. 109 (1): 1–60.
- —; Paulsen, Michael Stokes (2024). "The Sweep and Force of Section Three". University of Pennsylvania Law Review. 172 (3): 605–746. Archived from the original on February 27, 2024.
- —; Campbell, Jud; Sachs, Stephen E. (2024). "General Law and the Fourteenth Amendment". Stanford Law Review. 76 (6): 1185–1253.

== See also ==
- List of law clerks for the chief justice of the United States
