= Michael Kang =

Michael Kang may refer to:

- Michael Kang (director), director of the 2006 independent film The Motel
- Michael Kang (musician), member of the String Cheese Incident
- Michael Kang (billiards), American 3-cushion billiards player
- Michael S. Kang (born 1973), American legal scholar
