= Gregory Sisk =

American legal scholar

Gregory Charles Sisk is an American legal scholar.

Sisk earned his bachelor's degree from Montana State University and studied law at the University of Washington School of Law. He taught for twelve years at the Drake University Law School, where he held the Richard M. & Anita Calkins Distinguished Professorship, before joining the University of St. Thomas School of Law in 2003, where he is the Pio Cardinal Laghi Distinguished Chair in Law. Sisk is an elected member of the American Law Institute.
