= Robert Delahunty =

American legal scholar

Deputy General Counsel of the United States Homeland Security Council
- In office 2002–2003
- President: George W. Bush

Personal details
- Born: New York City, New York, U.S.
- Education: Columbia University (BA); University of Oxford (MA, MPhil); Harvard University (JD)

Robert J. Delahunty is an American legal scholar. He is a professor at the University of St. Thomas School of Law in Minneapolis, Minnesota. From 1989 to 2003, he worked in the Office of Legal Counsel. During his tenure there, he cowrote several legal opinions with John Yoo relating to interrogation, detention, and rendition of terror suspects.

== Education ==
Delahunty was born and raised in New York City, where he attended Regis High School in Manhattan. He then earned a Bachelor of Arts degree from Columbia University, followed by a Master of Arts in Classics and another in Philosophy, both from University of Oxford. Delahunty then returned to the United States, where he earned a Juris Doctor from Harvard Law School. After graduating from law school, he was admitted to the New York State Bar Association.

== Career ==
Delahunty has taught at Oriel College, Oxford, Durham University, Catholic University of America, and the University of St. Thomas. He served as Deputy General Counsel at the United States Homeland Security Council in 2002 and 2003.

=== Memos ===
Key elements of the October 23, 2001, memorandum, including conclusions that the Fourth Amendment does not apply to domestic military operations against foreign terrorists and that First Amendment speech and press rights may be subordinated to successful prosecution of war, were deemed "not authoritative for any purpose" by the Office of Legal Counsel in 2008. In 2009, the OLC also repudiated the November 15, 2001, memorandum’s assertion that Presidents have the inherent authority to suspend any provision of a treaty at any time, without notice to either Congress or our treaty partners.

Delahunty and Yoo's January 9, 2002 draft Memorandum to William J. Haynes II, General Counsel of the Department of Defense, "Application of Treaties and Laws to al Qaeda and Taliban Detainees" claims that al Qaeda and Taliban members are "not governed by the bulk of the Geneva Conventions, specifically those provisions concerning POWs." This memo promptly led on January 19, 2002 to a secret order from Secretary of Defense Donald Rumsfeld to his combat commanders, repeating its conclusions, and specifically ordering that the order be transmitted to "Joint Task Force 160", which at the time was setting up the new detainee prison at Guantanamo. The Supreme Court rejected this legal reasoning on June 29, 2006 in Hamdan v. Rumsfeld, which stated, "The conflict with al Qaeda is not, according to the Government, a conflict to which the full protections afforded detainees under the 1949 Geneva Conventions apply[...]. [T]here is at least one provision of the Geneva Conventions that applies here[...]. Common Article 3 [...] is applicable here and [...] requires that Hamdan be tried by a 'regularly constituted court affording all the judicial guarantees which are recognized as indispensable by civilized peoples.'" On July 7, 2006, Gordon R. England of the Defense Department ordered that Common article three of the Geneva Convention, which prohibits inhumane treatment of prisoners and requires certain basic legal rights at trial – would apply to all detainees held in U.S. military custody.

Some prominent lawyers and ethicists have argued that the authors of this memo bear responsibility for the results of the U.S. Government's application of its legal conclusion in the field. Judge White identified multiple precedents for holding lawyers liable for "the foreseeable consequences of their conduct" in Jose Padilla's lawsuit against Delahunty's colleague Yoo for the imprisonment and torture of Padilla. White summarized one such case as "holding that a lawyer may be held liable for substantially assisting in the violation of the law by issuing advice in violation of the law".

== See also ==
- Extraordinary rendition by the United States
- John Yoo
- Torture Memos
