= January 6 commission =

Failed legislation proposed during the 117th U.S. Congress

National Commission to Investigate the January 6 Attack on the United States Capitol Complex Act
- Long title: An Act to establish the National Commission to Investigate the January 6 riot on the United States Capitol Complex, and for other purposes
- Enacted by: the 117th United States Congress
- Number of co-sponsors: 1

Legislative history
- Introduced in the House of Representatives as H.R. 3233 by Bennie Thompson (D–MS) on May 14, 2021; Committee consideration by House Homeland Security Committee, later referred to the House Homeland Security Subcommittee on Intelligence and Counterterrorism; Passed the House of Representatives on May 19, 2021 (252–175)

The National Commission to Investigate the January 6 Attack on the United States Capitol Complex, known colloquially as the January 6 commission, was an unsuccessful proposal to create a commission that would have investigated the January 6 United States Capitol attack. On February 15, 2021, Speaker of the United States House of Representatives Nancy Pelosi announced that she planned to create a "9/11-type commission". The details were initially negotiated by Republican John Katko, and would have consisted of an equal number of Democrats and Republicans. A bill forming the commission passed the House of Representatives on May 19, with all Democrats and 35 Republicans voting in support of it. However, it was blocked by Senate Republicans on May 28, with 54 Senators voting in favor and 35 voting against, failing to clear the 60 votes needed to break a filibuster.

After the bill establishing the commission failed, the House of Representatives created the United States House Select Committee on the January 6 Attack.

== Background ==
=== January 6 attack on the United States Capitol ===
On January 6, 2021, an armed mob of supporters of Donald Trump stormed the United States Capitol in Washington D.C., in an attempt to keep Trump in power even though he lost the 2020 presidential election to Joe Biden. At the time of the attack, the US Congress was counting the votes of the electoral college, the last step to formalize Biden's victory as the 46th president of the United States. Five people died either shortly before, during, or following the event: one was shot by Capitol Police, another died of a drug overdose, and three died of natural causes. Many people were injured, including 138 police officers. Four officers who responded to the attack died by suicide within seven months. As of July 7, 2022, monetary damages to the government and police forces caused by the attackers exceeded $2,700,000.

=== Second impeachment of Donald Trump ===
A few days after the January 6 attack on the Capitol, the US House of Representatives filed one article of impeachment against Donald Trump, "incitement of insurrection". At the Senate impeachment trial on February 13, Trump was acquitted, the required two-thirds majority not being met.

=== Calls for formation ===
House Republican letter to Pelosi on the Capitol's security on January 6

Senator Lindsey Graham said that "[they] need a 9/11 commission to find out what happened and make sure it never happens again, and [he] want[s] to make sure that the Capitol footprint can be better defended next time." Senator Chris Coons agreed with this statement.

On February 15, 2021, Nancy Pelosi announced, in a letter to Democrats in the House of Representatives, she planned to create a "9/11-type commission" to investigate the January 6 attack on the US Capitol. It would have contained no members of Congress and been an "outside commission" In the letter, she said that

... [their] next step will be to establish an outside, independent 9/11-type commission to investigate and report on the facts and causes relating to the January 6, 2021, domestic terrorist attack upon the United States Capitol Complex ... and relating to the interference with the peaceful transfer of power, including facts and causes relating to the preparedness and response of the United States Capitol Police and other Federal, State, and local law enforcement in the National Capitol Region.

== Format ==
=== Priorities ===
The priorities would have been to "investigate and report on the facts and causes relating to the January 6, 2021 domestic terrorist attack upon the United States Capitol Complex… and relating to the interference with the peaceful transfer of power, including facts and causes relating to the preparedness and response of the United States Capitol Police and other Federal, State, and local law enforcement in the National Capitol Region."

=== Composition ===
Under the provisions of the bill, the commission would have been composed of ten members, outside of the federal government, appointed by congressional leaders. The four party leaders in Congress (Nancy Pelosi, Kevin McCarthy, Chuck Schumer, Mitch McConnell) would have each appointed two members, with Democratic leaders jointly appointing the chair and the Republican leaders jointly appointing the vice-chair. This would have allowed Democrats and Republicans to appoint equal number of members.

The commissioners would have been tasked with filing a report by the end of 2021, and ending 60 days after that.

== House passage ==
The chairman of the House Homeland Security Committee, Bennie Thompson, and its Republican ranking member, John Katko, announced on May 14 that they had reached an agreement on the creation of the panel. Under the deal, the Commission would have been modeled after the 9/11 Commission; ten members, half chosen by Democrats (including the chair) and half chosen by Republicans (including the vice chair). Subpoenas could be issued upon approval of both the chair and vice-chair, and the Commission would have produced a final report by the end of the year. Despite the deal, the leader of the House Republicans, Minority Leader Kevin McCarthy, opposed the bipartisan commission, coming out against its formation after the right-wing House Freedom Caucus and Trump opposed it.

The House voted on a bill forming the commission, and it passed the House of Representatives on May 19. Every Democrat, and 35 Republicans, supported it; other Republicans opposed.

== Defeated in the Senate ==
This legislation was ultimately blocked by Senate Republicans on May 28, with a vote of 54–35, short of the 60 needed to clear the filibuster. Eleven senators were absent for the vote, composed of two Democrats and nine Republicans. All present Democrats voted for the commission, along with Republicans Lisa Murkowski (R-AK), Rob Portman (R-OH), Mitt Romney (R-UT), Bill Cassidy (R-LA), Susan Collins (R-ME) and Ben Sasse (R-NE). All votes against were made by the other Republicans.

== Congressional viewpoints ==
=== Support in Congress ===
Senator Chuck Schumer promised that the House bill would receive a vote in the Senate, criticizing the minority leaders for bucking bipartisan negotiations.

Just a week after the Capitol attack, House Republican Leader Kevin McCarthy had advocated for congressional action to form a commission, stating that "a fact-finding commission ... would be prudent." In subsequent negotiations the Democrats’ proposal included three of the conditions McCarthy had requested. Members of the Problem Solvers Caucus expressed support for the commission. Republicans who voted to impeach Trump also expressed their support, such as Liz Cheney, Anthony Gonzalez, and Adam Kinzinger.

=== Opposition in Congress ===
On May 18, 2021, House Republican Leader Kevin McCarthy retracted his earlier support, accusing Pelosi of negotiating in bad faith, and stated that the scope of the legislation needed to examine other instances of political violence. McCarthy thus opposed the agreement that the House Homeland Security chairman Bennie Thompson made with the vice chairman John Katko, and which the House approved the next day as McCarthy announced opposition.

Other Republicans also gave various reasons for opposing the commission, including:

- Congressional committees could handle the job, together with prosecutions by the Department of Justice;
- The scope of the proposed commission excluded other recent instances of political violence including by left-wing groups;
- The chairperson who would be appointed by Democrats would have had final authority to choose all of the commission’s staff;
- It was allegedly designed as a “purely political exercise” that would not discover new facts or promote healing but would “drag on” to distract from the GOP message in the 2022 midterm elections;

On May 12 during a House Oversight Committee hearing, Arizona Representative Paul Gosar and Georgia Representative Jody Hice had asserted those who attacked the Capitol were "peaceful patriots". Gosar said one individual killed during the event, Trump supporter Ashli Babbitt, was "executed". Hice said it was "Trump supporters who lost their lives that day, not Trump supporters who were taking the lives of others." At the same hearing, Georgia representative Andrew Clyde downplayed the events saying "there was an undisciplined mob" but "to call it an insurrection in my opinion is a bold-faced lie." Because footage "showed people in an orderly fashion in between the stanchions and ropes taking pictures," Clyde said, "If you didn't know the footage was from January 6, you would actually think it was a normal tourist visit."

Wisconsin Senator Ron Johnson met with Gladys Sicknick and Sandra Garza, mother and longtime girlfriend, respectively, of deceased Capitol officer Brian Sicknick, prior to his vote. Johnson had previously voiced opposition to the bill, and said he "respectfully disagree[d]" with the two following the meeting.

== Subsequent events ==
On June 8, 2021, the Senate released the results of its investigation of the riot. On June 24, Pelosi announced that the House would investigate these matters, and the United States House Select Committee on the January 6 Attack was formed on July 1, 2021.

== See also ==
- Presidential Commission on the Supreme Court of the United States
- United States House Select Committee on the January 6 Attack
- Public hearings of the United States House Select Committee on the January 6 Attack
