= John McGinnis =

American legal scholar

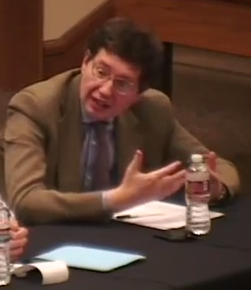
John McGinnis speaking on a panel

John Oldham McGinnis is an American legal scholar. He is a professor at the Northwestern University Pritzker School of Law and author of over 90 academic and popular articles and essays. His popular writings have been published in The Wall Street Journal, National Review, and Policy Review.

== Education and career ==
McGinnis graduated from Phillips Exeter Academy in 1975, and earned a B.A. from Harvard University in 1978, an M.A. from Balliol College, Oxford, in 1980, and a J.D., magna cum laude, from Harvard Law School in 1983. In 1997 he received the Paul M. Bator Award, which is awarded annually by the Federalist Society to an "outstanding legal scholar" under forty. McGinnis worked in the Office of Legal Counsel, Department of Justice from 1985 to 1991. He has given 10 testimonies before congress. McGinnis was also a litigation associate at the prestigious Sullivan & Cromwell, and a clerk on the United States Court of Appeals for the District of Columbia.

McGinnis's government posts are currently as a member of the National Advisory Committee for the North American Agreement on Labor Cooperation, and as a roster member of the United States Panelists for Resolution of World Trade Organization Disputes. He is a member of the conservative Federalist Society.

== Selected research ==
McGinnis is a co-author of a law review article stating that the majority of law school faculty members donate more to Democrats than to Republicans. He uses this to attack the "viewpoint diversity" justification that the U.S. Supreme Court used to permit law schools to give racial minorities an advantage in their admissions processes. His argument is that law schools are not, and probably should not be, committed to political viewpoint diversity in the hiring process (implying that they should not use affirmative action-like techniques in recruiting and admitting students).

McGinnis has published several books. In Accelerating Democracy: Transforming Governance Through Technology he argues that rapidly changing information technology can improve policy. In Originalism and the Good Constitution he and Mike Rappaport contend that interpreting the Constitution according to its original meaning continues to have beneficial consequences today.

An advocate of cryptocurrency, McGinnis co-authored an academic paper and Wall Street Journal op-ed with Kyle Roche in 2017 professing the strengths of Bitcoin.

== Selected bibliography ==
- "The Origin of Conservatism: Evolutionary theories suggest that conservative politics are necessary to govern a fallen man," National Review, December 22, 1997. (Cover story)
  - McGinnis, John O. (December 22, 1997). "The descent of man: can conservative concepts be derived from evolution? Critics respond to John O. McGinnis". National Review. 50 (4). Archived from the original on December 19, 2007 – via FindArticles.
- The World Trade Constitution (with Mark Movsesian, volume published in Chinese) The People's Press (2004)
- McGinnis, John O. (Summer 2010). "Accelerating AI". Northwestern University Law Review. 104 (3): 1253–1270. Archived from the original on December 1, 2014.
- McGinnis, John O. (August 14, 2025). "America's Bet on AI – John O. McGinnis". Law & Liberty.
- "The World Trade Organization as a Structure of Liberty," Harvard Journal of Law and Public Policy, 2004.
- Why Democracy Needs the Rich. Encounter Books. February 24, 2026. ISBN 9781641774635.
