= Olatunde C. Johnson =

American legal scholar (born 1968)

- Education: Yale University; Stanford Law School
- Scientific career
- Fields: Civil Rights Law; Civil Procedure; Constitutional Law
- Workplaces: Columbia Law School

Olatunde C. Johnson (born 1968) is an American legal scholar. She teaches at Columbia Law School as Jerome B. Sherman Professor of Law.

Johnson graduated from Yale College in 1989 with a Bachelor of Arts degree, and from Stanford Law School with a Juris Doctor degree in 1995. She became a law clerk for David Tatel and John Paul Stevens, then worked for the NAACP Legal Defense Fund for four years before advising Edward M. Kennedy on constitutional and civil rights matters from 2001 to 2003. She is an elected member of the American Law Institute.

Johnson was a member of President Joe Biden's Presidential Commission on the Supreme Court of the United States, which examined proposals for reforming the Supreme Court.
