= Jonathan R. Macey =

Professor of corporate law (born 1955)

- Born: 1955 (age 70–71)
- Education: Harvard University (BA); Yale University (JD)
- Occupation: Law professor

Jonathan R. Macey (born 1955) is an American legal scholar who serves as the Sam Harris Professor of Corporate Law, Corporate Finance and Securities Law at Yale Law School. Macey is the 4th most cited legal scholar ever in the world in the field of corporate law.

== Early life and education ==
Macey enrolled at Harvard University in 1973 as an undergraduate and earned his B.A., cum laude, from Harvard University in 1977, and his J.D. from Yale Law School in 1982, where he was the article and book review editor of the Yale Law Journal. In 1996, Macey received a Ph.D., honoris causa, from the Stockholm School of Economics.

Following law school, Macey was a law clerk for Judge Henry J. Friendly on the U.S. Court of Appeals for the Second Circuit.

== Career ==
From 1991 to 2004, Macey was J. DuPratt White Professor of Law, director of the John M. Olin Program in Law and Economics at Cornell Law School, and professor of law and business at Cornell University's Johnson Graduate School of Business.

Macey has taught at major universities throughout the world, including Bocconi University (Milan), the University of Tokyo; the University of Toronto; the University of Turin, the University of Amsterdam Department of Finance, and the Stockholm School of Economics, Department of Law. He also has been professor of law at the University of Chicago (1990) and visiting professor of law at Harvard Law School (1999). Macey is a senior research fellow at the International Centre for Economic Research (ICER) in Turin, Italy. Macey also serves on the academic advisory board (Comitato Scientifico) of the Associazione Disiano Preite for the study of corporate law (per lo studio del diritto dell'impresa).

In 1995, Macey was awarded the Paul M. Bator Award for excellence in Teaching, Scholarship and Public Service by the Federalist Society for Law and Public Policy. In 1996, he received a Ph.D., honoris causa from the Stockholm School of Economics. And in 1998, he received the D.P. Jacobs prize for the most significant paper in volume 6 of the Journal of Financial Intermediation for his paper (co-authored with Maureen O'Hara), "The Law & Economics of Best Execution." In 1999 Macey was made an honorary fellow of the Society For Advanced Legal Studies. In 2000, Macey became a member of the legal advisory committee to the board of directors of the New York Stock Exchange. In 2001 Macey was appointed a Bertil Daniellson Distinguished Visiting Professor in Banking and Finance at the Stockholm School of Economics. In 2002 Macey was appointed to the economic advisory board of the National Association of Securities Dealers (NASD). In 2004 Macey was awarded a Teaching Award by the Yale Law Women in recognition of his "commitment to excellence in teaching, mentoring and inspiring." In 2005 Macey became a member of the board of editors of Thomson West Publishing Company.

== Works ==
Macey is the author of several books, including the two-volume treatise, Macey on Corporation Laws, published in 1998 (Aspen Law & Business), and co-author of two leading casebooks, Corporations: Including Partnerships and Limited Liability Companies (2003 Thomson West), which is in its eighth edition, and The Law of Financial Institutions,"(2013 Wolters Kluwer Law & Business), which is now in its fifth edition.

He also is the author of over 100 scholarly articles. His recent articles have appeared in the Banking Law Journal, the University of Chicago Law Review, the Stanford Law Review, the Yale Law Journal, the Cornell Law Review, the Journal of Law and Economics, and the Brookings Wharton Papers on Financial Institutions. He has published numerous editorials in such publications as the Wall Street Journal, Forbes, the Los Angeles Times and the National Law Journal.

Macey is also the author of Corporate Governance: Promises Kept, Promises Broken, which was published in October 2008 by Princeton University Press.

== Bibliography ==
- Macey, Jonathan R. (2008). "Market for Corporate Control". In David R. Henderson (ed.). Concise Encyclopedia of Economics (2nd ed.). Indianapolis: Library of Economics and Liberty. pp. 333–337. ISBN 978-0865976658. OCLC 237794267.
