= Andrew Manuel Crespo =

American lawyer (born 1983)

Presidential Commission on the Supreme Court of the United States
- In office April 9, 2021 – December 7, 2021
- President: Joe Biden

Personal details
- Born: 1983 (age 42–43)
- Education: Harvard University (BA, JD)

Andrew Manuel Crespo (born 1983) is an American legal scholar.

== Early life and education ==
Crespo is of Puerto Rican descent and was raised in Monroe, New York. He graduated from Harvard College in 2005, and earned his degree in law at Harvard Law School in 2008. During his time as a law student, Crespo served as the first Latino president of the Harvard Law Review.

== Career ==
Crespo became a public defender specializing in juvenile law before joining the faculty at Harvard Law in 2015 as an assistant professor. There, Crespo was named Morris Wasserstein Public Interest Professor of Law. In 2021, Crespo cofounded the Institute to End Mass Incarceration at Harvard Law. In 2021, President Joseph Biden appointed Crespo to serve on the Presidential Commission on the Supreme Court of the United States. In 2022, Crespo was elected a member of the American Law Institute. Crespo is a member of the Academic Advisory Board of the American Constitution Society.

=== Notable cases ===
In 2020, Crespo was a counsel of record for the respondent in Kansas v. Glover. The case was argued at the Supreme Court.

== Personal life ==
Crespo is married to Abby Shafroth, a fellow graduate of Harvard College and Harvard Law. Shafroth is a civil rights attorney and consumer justice advocate in Boston. Crespo performed with an a Cappella singing group (The Veritones) while attending Harvard Law School.

== Selected publications ==
- Systemic Facts: Toward Institutional Awareness in Criminal Courts, 129 Harv. L. Rev. 2117 (2016)
- The Hidden Law of Plea Bargaining, 118 Colum. L. Rev. 1303 (2018)
- Unpacking DHS’s Troubling Explanation of the Portland Van Video, Lawfare (July 25, 2020)
- Andrew Manuel Crespo, Charles R. Breyer, Jennifer Nou et al., In Tribute: Justice Stephen G. Breyer, 136 Harv. L. Rev. 8 (2022)
- No Justice, No Pleas: Subverting Mass Incarceration Through Defendant Collective Action, Fordham L. Rev. (2022)

== See also ==
- List of law clerks for the second seat of the Supreme Court of the United States
- List of law clerks for the fourth seat of the Supreme Court of the United States
