= Michael S. Kang =

Michael S. Kang (born 12 June 1973) is an American legal scholar.

Kang earned a bachelor's degree from the University of Chicago in 1993, and his J.D. degree from the University of Chicago Law School in 1999. He also holds a master's degree from the University of Illinois and a Ph.D. from Harvard University. While on the faculty of the Emory University School of Law, Kang received the David J. Bederman Research Professorship in October 2015, was considered a highly cited legal scholar in a 2016 analysis by Gregory Sisk, and was named Thomas Simmons Professor of Law in 2017. He later joined Northwestern University's Pritzker School of Law as William G. and Virginia K. Karnes Research Professor of Law. After Kimberly Yuracko stepped down from the deanship at Pritzker in 2020, Kang was named to a search committee tasked with naming a successor. In 2021, Kang served on the Presidential Commission on the Supreme Court of the United States.
