= Stephen E. Sachs =

American legal scholar (born 1979 or 1980)

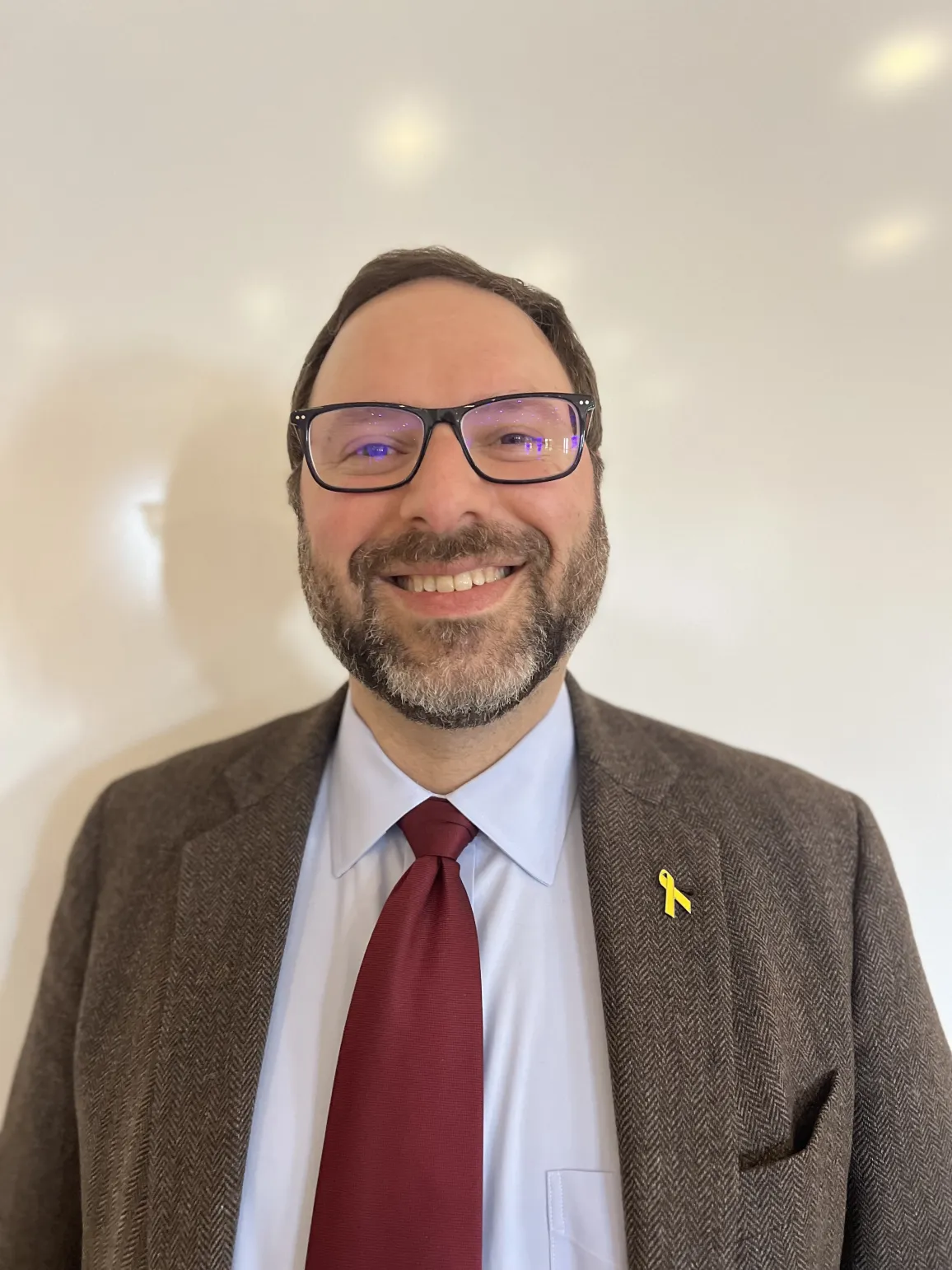
- Sachs in 2025
- Born: 1979 or 1980 (age 46–47); New York, U.S.
- Education: Harvard University (BA); Merton College, Oxford (MA); Yale University (JD)
- Title: Antonin Scalia Professor of Law
- Awards: Joseph Story Award (2020)

Academic work
- Discipline: Constitutional law
- Institutions: Duke University; University of Chicago; Harvard University
- Website: hls.harvard.edu/faculty/stephen-sachs/

Stephen Edward Sachs (born 1979 or 1980) is an American legal scholar. He has been the Antonin Scalia Professor of Law at Harvard Law School since 2021. He is a scholar of constitutional law, civil procedure, conflict of laws, and originalism.

== Early life and education ==
Sachs was born in New York to a Jewish family. He is the son of Alan A. Sachs, a lawyer in St. Louis, Missouri, who was a student of Charles Fried and a graduate of Harvard Law School, and Marilyn M. Sachs, a scholar of French literature. In 1985, Sachs' family moved to St. Louis, where he graduated from Clayton High School in Clayton, Missouri, in 1998. After high school, Sachs attended Harvard University, where he was a resident in Quincy House and served as the editorial chairman of The Harvard Crimson.

As an undergraduate, Sachs studied under law professor Charles Donahue and cross-enrolled at Harvard Law School. In 2002, he graduated summa cum laude and first in his class from Harvard College with a Bachelor of Arts specializing in medieval history with membership in Phi Beta Kappa. For achieving the highest undergraduate grade point average at Harvard, he was awarded the university's Sophia Freund Prize. His senior thesis, "The 'Law Merchant' and the Fair Court of St. Ives, 1270-1324," was supervised by medievalist Thomas N. Bisson and earned him the university's Thomas T. Hoopes Prize and Philip Washburn Prize for outstanding scholarly work.

After graduating from Harvard, Sachs was awarded a Rhodes Scholarship to study in England at the University of Oxford. As a Rhodes Scholar, he earned a first class degree in philosophy, politics and economics from Merton College, Oxford in 2004, which was promoted to a Master of Arts in June 2008. He then entered Yale Law School, where he became the executive editor of The Yale Law Journal and the executive editor and articles editor of the Yale Law & Policy Review. He won the law school's Joseph Parker Prize for legal history and its Jewell Prize for contributions to a secondary journal before receiving his Juris Doctor in 2007.

== Career ==
From 2007 to 2008, Sachs served as a law clerk for Judge Stephen F. Williams of the United States Court of Appeals for the District of Columbia Circuit, then entered private practice at the law firm of Mayer Brown in Washington, D.C., as an associate attorney in appellate litigation. From 2009 to 2010, he clerked for Chief Justice John Roberts at the United States Supreme Court.

In 2011, Sachs became an assistant professor at the Duke University School of Law. He was appointed as an associate professor in 2014 then was elevated to a full-time professorship with tenure in 2016. He assumed the law school's appointment as its Colin W. Brown Professor of Law in 2020. On July 1, 2021, he moved to Harvard Law School to serve as its inaugural Antonin Scalia Professor of Law, a position established in 2017. Harvard president Alan Garber appointed Sachs in 2024 to an advisory committee of twelve Harvard Law faculty members in order to determine the next dean of Harvard Law School.

Sachs is an elected member of the American Law Institute. On March 14, 2020, he was awarded the Joseph Story Award by the Federalist Society. During the early months of 2020, he was also a visiting professor at the University of Chicago Law School.

== Personal life ==
Sachs is a resident of Massachusetts and has also lived in England, Connecticut, Wisconsin, and Virginia. He is married and has two children.

== Selected publications ==
- Sachs, Stephen E. (2009). "Full Faith and Credit in the Early Congress". Virginia Law Review. 95 (5): 1201–80.
- — (2012). "Constitutional Backdrops". George Washington University Law Review. 80 (6): 1813–88.
- — (2015). "Originalism as a Theory of Legal Change". Harvard Journal of Law and Public Policy. 38 (3): 817–888.
- —; Baude, William (2017). "The Law of Interpretation". Harvard Law Review. 130 (4): 1079–1147. JSTOR 44865509.
- — (2017). "Originalism Without Text" (PDF). The Yale Law Journal. 127 (1): 156–168. JSTOR 45222567.
- — (2017). "Pennoyer Was Right". Texas Law Review. 95 (6): 1249–1328.
- — (2018). "Finding Law". California Law Review. 107: 527–581.
- —; Baude, William (2019). "Grounding Originalism". Northwestern University Law Review. 113 (6): 1455–92.
- — (2021). "Originalism: Standard and Procedure". Harvard Law Review. 135: 777–830.

== See also ==
- William Baude
- List of law clerks for the chief justice of the United States
