= Kate Andrias =

American legal scholar

Kate E. Andrias (born c. 1976) is an American jurist and legal scholar.

== Biography ==
Andrias was raised on the Upper West Side of Manhattan. She attended Yale College and Yale University, earning a Bachelor's of Arts degree in 1997, followed by a Juris Doctor in 2004. Andrias clerked for Stephen Reinhardt and Ruth Bader Ginsburg, then joined Perkins Coie, specializing in election law and working with Barack Obama's first presidential campaign. During Obama's presidency, Andrias served as associate counsel and special assistant, then chief of staff of the White House Counsel's Office.

Andrias left the Obama administration in 2011 for a fellowship at Columbia University, and taught at the University of Michigan School of Law from 2013 to 2021. During her tenure at Michigan, Andrias was promoted to a full professorship in 2018.

She left Michigan for Columbia Law School in July 2021. In April of that same year, Andrias was named to the Presidential Commission on the Supreme Court of the United States, serving until the commission published its final report in December. At Columbia, Andrias holds the Patricia D. and R. Paul Yetter Professorship of Law.

Andrias is an elected member of the American Law Institute.
