= Tara Leigh Grove =

American legal scholar

Academic background
- Education: Duke University (BA); Harvard University (JD)

Academic work
- Discipline: Law
- Sub-discipline: Federal judiciary Separation of powers
- Institutions: Florida State University; College of William & Mary; University of Alabama; University of Texas at Austin

Tara Leigh Grove is an American legal scholar working as a professor and the Vinson & Elkins Chair in Law at the University of Texas School of Law.

== Education ==
Grove earned a Bachelor of Arts degree in political science, summa cum laude, from Duke University. She spent a year teaching English in Japan and earned a Juris Doctor from Harvard Law School. In law school, Grove worked as the Supreme Court chair of the Harvard Law Review.

== Career ==
Grove served as a law clerk for Judge Emilio Garza before working for the United States Department of Justice Civil Division for four years. Grove began teaching at the Florida State University College of Law in 2009, and joined the faculty of the College of William & Mary in 2011, where she was named Mills E. Godwin, Jr. Professor of Law. In 2020, Grove accepted an appointment as the Charles E. Tweedy, Jr. Endowed Chairholder in Law at the University of Alabama School of Law. She served on the Presidential Commission on the Supreme Court of the United States. In summer 2022, Grove left the University of Alabama School of Law for the University of Texas School of Law, where she currently serves as the Vinson & Elkins Chair in Law.
