= Bertrall Ross =

American legal scholar (born 1976)

- Born: Bertrall L. Ross II; 1976 (age 49–50)

Academic background
- Education: Yale Law School; Princeton University; University of Colorado Boulder; London School of Economics

Academic work
- Institutions: University of Virginia School of Law; UC Berkeley School of Law

Bertrall L. Ross II (born 1976) is an American legal scholar.

Ross completed his bachelor's degree at the University of Colorado Boulder, and earned a Master's in Public Affairs from the Woodrow Wilson School of Public and International Affairs in 2003, as well as a second master's degree from the London School of Economics. Ross obtained his degree in law from Yale Law School. He taught at the University of California, Berkeley as Chancellor's Professor of Law, until joining the University of Virginia School of Law in 2021 as Justice Thurgood Marshall Distinguished Professor of Law.
