= University of St. Thomas School of Law =

Law school in Minneapolis, Minnesota, United States

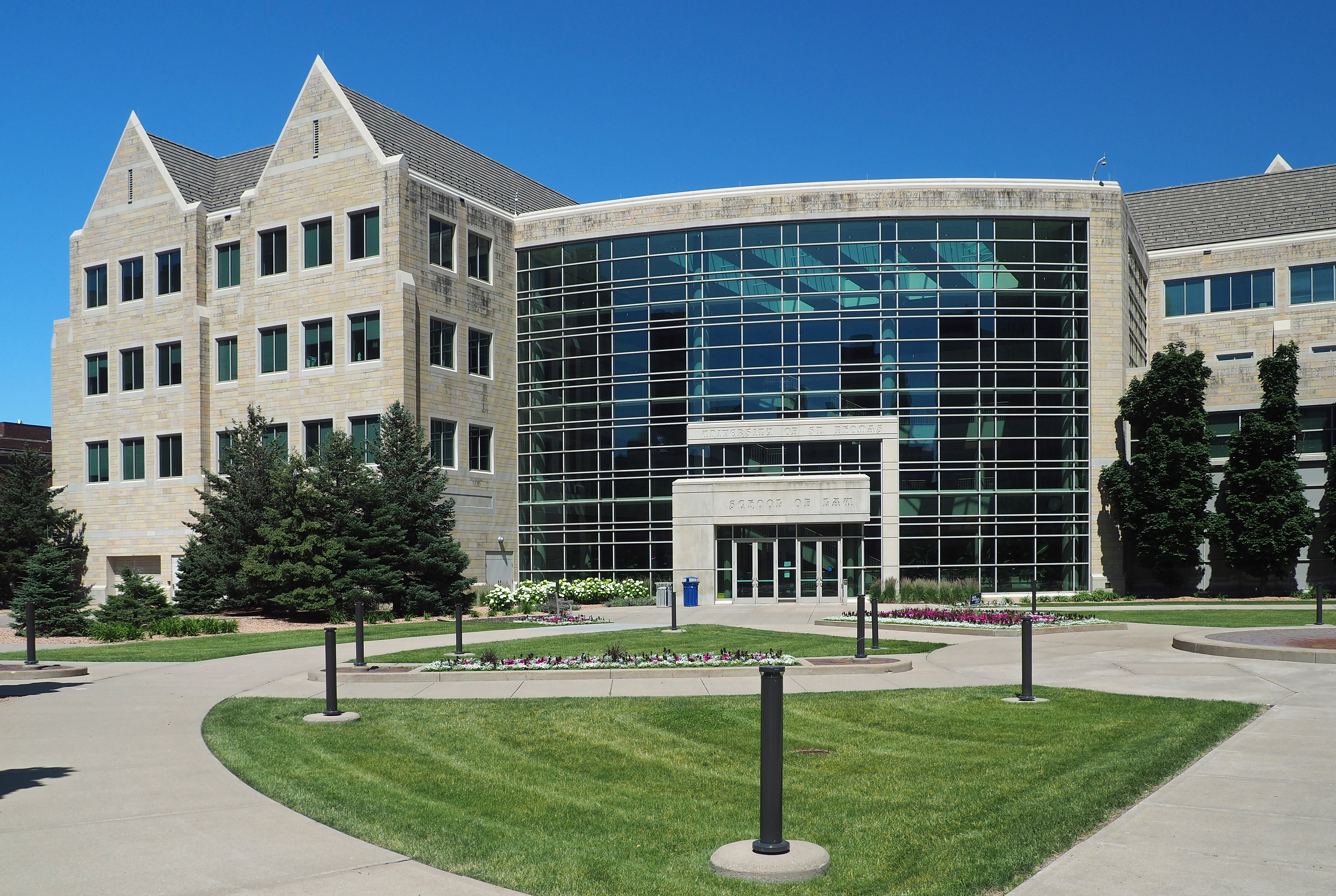
- The School of Law building from the east
- Established: 1999 (First graduating class 2004; 22 years ago)
- School type: Private
- Dean: Daniel B. Kelly
- Location: Minneapolis, Minnesota, US; 44°58′26″N 93°16′43″W
- Enrollment: 476
- USNWR ranking: 105th (tie) (2026)
- Bar pass rate: 81.54%
- Website: https://law.stthomas.edu

The University of St. Thomas School of Law is the law school of University of St. Thomas in Minneapolis, Minnesota. It is one of three law schools in Minneapolis–Saint Paul. It currently enrolls 476 students. St. Thomas Law is accredited by the American Bar Association. It is also a member of The Association of American Law Schools. Founded in 1999, the School of Law graduated its first class in 2004.

== History ==
St. Thomas Law was founded in 1923, but closed in 1933 in the wake of the Great Depression. The law school reopened in 1999. David T. Link, then dean of Notre Dame Law School, was named founding dean of St. Thomas School of Law in July 2001. St. Thomas Law was accredited by the American Bar Association in 2006 and became a member of the American Association of Law Schools in 2012.

== Campus ==
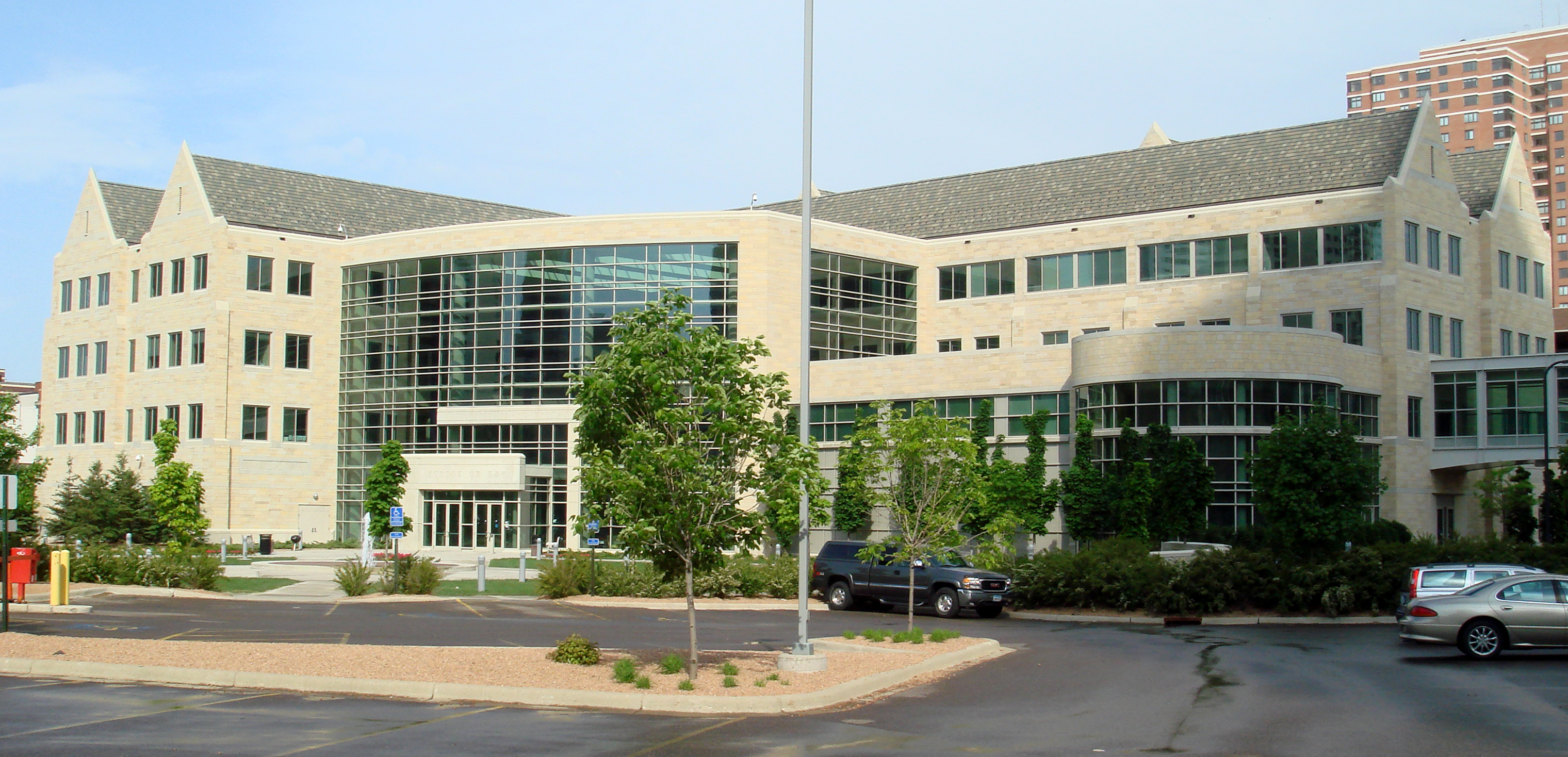
The School of Law building

St. Thomas Law is located in downtown Minneapolis. The 158,000 square foot building opened in 2003, and sits at the corner of 11th Street and LaSalle Avenue. The $34.8 million building includes a four-story atrium, a 40,000-square-foot (3,700 m^{2}) law library, a two-story chapel, and a classically designed moot court room. The law school is connected by skyway to the downtown Minneapolis legal and business communities.

== Mentor Externship Program ==
Students at St. Thomas Law participate in a mentor externship program where students are partnered with lawyers and judges to experience the law in practice. The Mentor Externship Program matches each J.D. student with a mentor during all three years of law school. St. Thomas Law is one of two law schools in the country that offer more externships than full-time enrollment. In 2005, the Mentor Externship Program was awarded the E. Smythe Gambrell Professionalism Award by the American Bar Association Standing Committee on Professionalism. It was ranked the No. 2 law school in the nation for practical training by National Jurist in 2024. St. Thomas Law has been ranked among the top three law schools in this category since 2014.

== Employment outcomes and cost ==
According to St. Thomas's ABA-required employment disclosures, 92.5% of the Class of 2023 obtained full-time, bar-passage required jobs within 10 months of graduation. St. Thomas Law's Law School Transparency under-employment score is 7.5%, indicating the percentage of the Class of 2023 who were unemployed, pursuing an additional degree, or working in a non-professional, short-term or part-time job 10 months after graduation.

Tuition at St. Thomas School of Law for the 2024–25 academic year is $24,636 per term.

== Rankings ==
- The University of St. Thomas School of Law is ranked No. 105 by U.S. News & World Report 2026
- The school is ranked No. 2 in the U.S. for practical training by National Jurist. The school's Mentor Externship program matches every current law student with a mentor during all three years of law school.
- In 2016, for the first time, St. Thomas Law ranked in the U.S. News & World Report "Best Law Clinics" at No. 27.
- In 2011, 2013, 2014, 2015 and 2016, St. Thomas law professors ranked in the top 10 on Princeton Review's "Best Professors" list.
- The school was ranked between #1 and #8 for the "Best Quality of Life for Students" by the Princeton Review for five straight years from 2004 to 2009 and again from 2014 to 2021.
- The school ranked No. 8 in the U.S. as a Best Value Private Law School by National Jurist.
- The scholarly impact of the School of Law's faculty ranked No. 23 out of nearly 200 law schools nationwide, building the methodology originally developed by University of Chicago law professor Brian Leiter, now compiled by Professor Gregory Sisk.

== Student body profile ==
The JD class of 2026 (entering 2023) is made up of 157 students. 26% of the class represents minority students (including international students). The median undergraduate GPA was a 3.62 and the median LSAT score was 155.

== Curriculum ==
St. Thomas Law is best known for its emphasis on mentoring, relationships, practical training and social justice. The school offers the three-year Juris Doctor, as well as combined degrees: the JD/MBA, the JD/MA in Catholic studies, the JD/MSW (Master of Social Work). St. Thomas Law also offers an online master's degree program in organizational ethics and compliance. An LL.M. in U.S. Law is offered for internationally training attorneys.

Some of the most popular programs of study include courses in the areas of family and community law, public policy, civil procedure, advocacy, environmental law, international law, as well as human rights law. St. Thomas Law students are placed at the top firms and companies in the Midwest through the On Campus Interview (OCI) program and through the extensive mentorship program. The school has a 6.85:1 student to faculty ratio.

== Publications ==
St. Thomas Law has two journals that are published regularly, University of St. Thomas Law Journal and University of St. Thomas Journal of Law and Public Policy.

== Terrence J. Murphy Institute for Catholic Thought, Law and Business ==
The Terrence J. Murphy Institute for Catholic Thought, Law and Business is a partnership between the Center for Catholic Studies and the School of Law at the University of St. Thomas. The Institute explores the various interactions between law and Catholic thought on topics ranging from workers' rights to criminal law to marriage and family.

== Holloran Center for Ethical Leadership in the Professions ==
The Holloran Center for Ethical Leadership in the Professions is one of 13 national centers in law schools devoted to ethics and professionalism that is recognized by the American Bar Association's Center for Professional Responsibility.

== Notable faculty ==
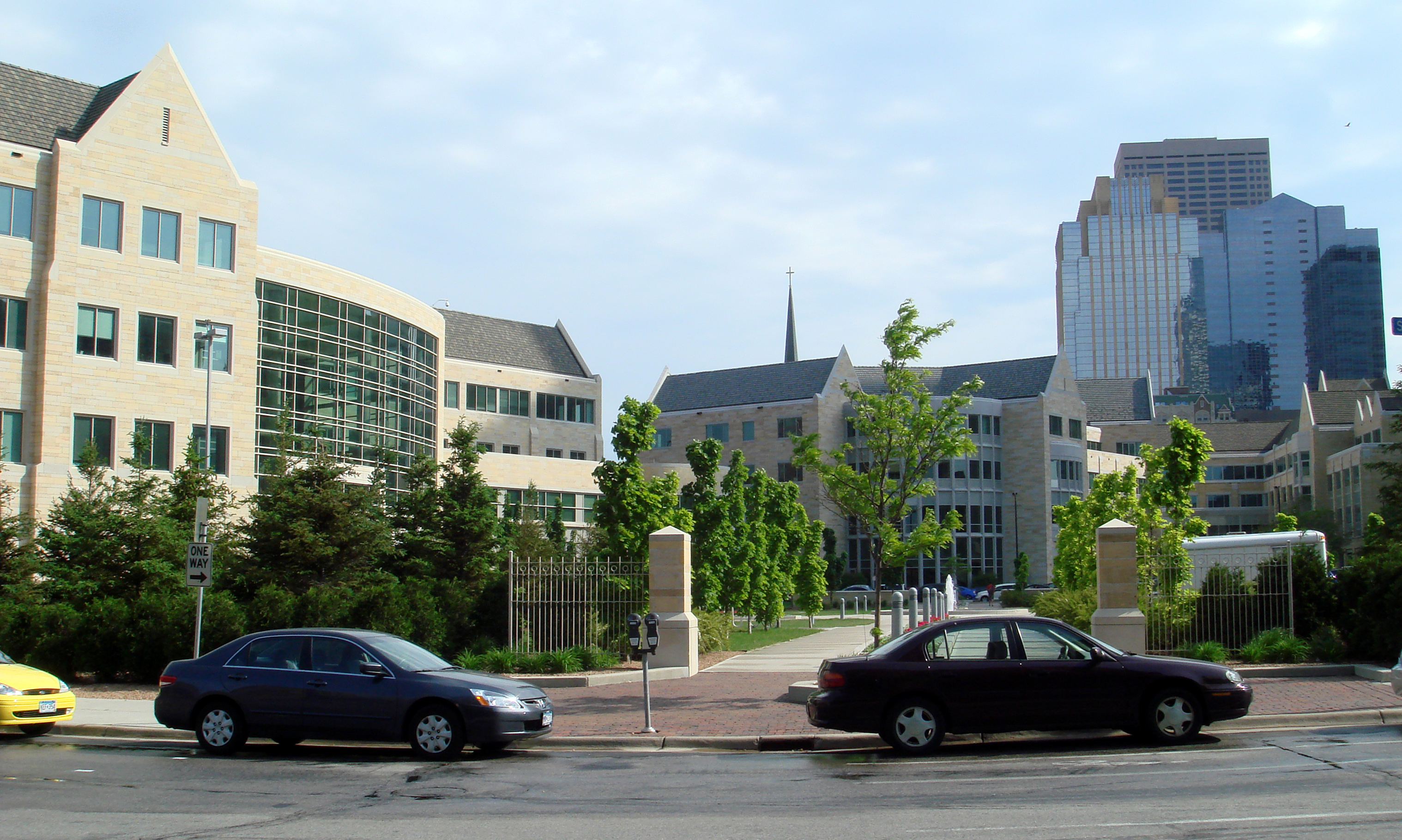
Downtown Minneapolis Campus

- Rachel Moran, former public defender, one of the nation's leading scholars on policing issues.
- Patrick J. Schiltz. University of St. Thomas School of Law: founding associate dean, 2000-2003; law professor (St. Thomas More Chair in Law), 2003-2006. Schiltz was nominated and appointed by President George W. Bush in 2005 to serve as a judge on the U.S. District Court for the District of Minnesota; he later served as Chief Judge of the District from 2022 to 2026 and now serves as a Senior Judge in the district.
- Jake Sullivan, National Security Advisor for President Joe Biden
- Mark Osler, author and critic of capital punishment in the United States.
- Robert Delahunty, author of controversial memos under the Bush administration related to the applicability of the Geneva Conventions to the War on Terror
- Nekima Levy-Pounds, lawyer, professor, activist, writer, and preacher. She was elected in 2015 to be the president of the Minneapolis chapter of the NAACP and in 2016 was a candidate for mayor of Minneapolis. She left her job at St. Thomas Law in July 2016.
- Thomas Berg, legal scholar.
- Michael Stokes Paulsen, legal scholar, professor, and Distinguished University Chair at the University of St. Thomas School of Law, and the previous McKnight Presidential Professor of Law & Policy at the University of Minnesota Law School.
