= Michael D. Ramsey =

Michael D. Ramsey (born July 22, 1964) is an American legal scholar.

Ramsey studied history and economics at Dartmouth College, graduating in 1986 with a bachelor of arts degree. He then attended Stanford Law School, where he graduated first in his class. After completing his legal studies in 1989, Ramsey served as a law clerk for J. Clifford Wallace and Antonin Scalia. Ramsey is the Warren Distinguished Professor of Law at the University of San Diego School of Law. In 2021, he was appointed to the Presidential Commission on the Supreme Court of the United States.
