= Caleb Nelson =

American legal scholar

Caleb E. Nelson

Personal details
- Education: Harvard University (BA); Yale University (JD)

Caleb E. Nelson is an influential American legal scholar. As of 2013 he was the Emerson G. Spies Distinguished Professor of Law at the University of Virginia School of Law He is the author of the highly cited article "Preemption," which appeared in the March 2000 issue of the Virginia Law Review.

== Early life and education ==
Caleb E. Nelson is the son of David Aldrich Nelson, a former judge on the United States Court of Appeals for the Sixth Circuit, and Mary Nelson. He graduated magna cum laude and Phi Beta Kappa from Harvard University in 1988 with an A.B. in mathematics, where he was editor-in-chief of the Salient.

Nelson then moved to Washington, D.C., where he served as the managing editor of The Public Interest, a domestic-policy quarterly. In 1993, he graduated from Yale Law School.

== Career ==
=== Legal practice ===
After graduating from Yale, Nelson clerked for Judge Stephen F. Williams of the United States Court of Appeals for the District of Columbia Circuit and then for Justice Clarence Thomas of the Supreme Court of the United States.

He then spent three years as a litigation associate at the firm Taft Stettinius & Hollister in Cincinnati.

=== Academia ===
In 1998, Nelson joined the law faculty at the University of Virginia. As a professor, Nelson focuses his teaching and research on federal courts, constitutional law, legislation, and civil procedure. As of 2013 Nelson was Emerson G. Spies Distinguished Professor of Law at the University of Virginia School of Law.

=== Important publications ===
- Nelson, Caleb (1993), "A Re-Evaluation of Scholarly Explanations of the Rise of the Elective Judiciary in Antebellum America", The American Journal of Legal History, 37 (2): 190–224, doi:10.2307/845373, JSTOR 845373.
- Nelson, Caleb (2000), "Preemption", Virginia Law Review, 86 (2): 225–305, doi:10.2307/1073916, JSTOR 1073916.
- Nelson, Caleb (2001), "Stare Decisis and Demonstrably Erroneous Precedents", Virginia Law Review, 87 (1): 1–84, doi:10.2307/1073894, JSTOR 1073894.
- Nelson, Caleb (2002), "Sovereign Immunity as a Doctrine of Personal Jurisdiction", Harvard Law Review, 115 (6): 1559–1654, doi:10.2307/1342562, JSTOR 1342562.
- Nelson, Caleb (2003), "Originalism and Interpretive Conventions", The University of Chicago Law Review, 70 (2): 519–598, doi:10.2307/1600589, JSTOR 1600589.
- Woolhandler, Ann; Nelson, Caleb (2004), "Does History Defeat Standing Doctrine?", Michigan Law Review, 104 (2): 689–733, doi:10.2307/4141925, JSTOR 4141925.
- Nelson, Caleb (2006), "The Persistence of General Law", Columbia Law Review, 106 (3): 503–568, JSTOR 4099445.
- Nelson, Caleb (2007), "Adjudication in the Political Branches", Columbia Law Review, 107 (3): 559–627, JSTOR 40041715.

== Awards and honors ==
- Winner of the Scholarly Papers Competition, Association of American Law Schools (2000)
- Paul M. Bator Award, the Federalist Society (2006)
- University of Virginia McFarland Award (2006)
- University of Virginia All-University Teaching Award (2008)

== See also ==
- List of law clerks for the tenth seat of the Supreme Court of the United States
