= Michael Stokes Paulsen =

American legal scholar (born 1959)

Michael Paulsen
- Born: Michael Stokes Paulsen; April 24, 1959 (age 67)
- Education: Northwestern University (BA); Yale University (MA, JD)
- Occupations: Legal scholar; author; professor
- Spouse: Kristen Stokes Paulsen (m. 1987)

Michael Stokes Paulsen (born April 24, 1959) is an American legal scholar. He is a professor and the Distinguished University Chair at the University of St. Thomas School of Law, and was previously the McKnight Presidential Professor of Law & Public Policy at the University of Minnesota Law School.

== Early life and education ==
Paulsen was born on April 24, 1959. He graduated Phi Beta Kappa from Northwestern University in 1981 with a Bachelor of Arts (B.A.) with distinction in economics, and then enrolled in the Northwestern Pritzker School of Law, where he was selected for the Northwestern University Law Review. Paulsen later transferred to Yale University, where he dual enrolled in Yale Divinity School and Yale Law School.

As a student at Yale Law School, Paulsen was roommates with Akhil Amar, studied under Robert Bork, and served as an editor of the Yale Law Journal. He received both his Master of Arts (M.A.) in religion and his Juris Doctor (J.D.) from Yale in 1985. Paulsen also had been the student director of the recently established Federalist Society chapter at Yale Law School and the director of the Yale Moot Court.

== Legal career ==
In 1991, Paulsen became an associate professor at the University of Minnesota Law School; he was promoted to a full-time professorship in 1998. He was the university's Julius E. Davis Professor from 1998–1999, an associate dean from 2004–2007, and was appointed as the McKnight Presidential Professor of Law & Public Policy in 2004, serving in that position until 2007. In 2007, Paulsen became a professor of law and the Distinguished University Chair at the University of St. Thomas School of Law.

Paulsen regularly speaks at the Federalist Society.

== Personal life ==
Paulsen and his wife have two children.
