= Southern California Law Review =

- Discipline: Law
- Language: English

Publication details
- History: 1927–present
- Publisher: USC Gould School of Law (United States)
- Frequency: Bimonthly

Standard abbreviations
- Bluebook: S. Cal. L. Rev.
- ISO 4: South. Calif. Law Rev.

Indexing
- ISSN: 0038-3910

Links
- Journal homepage; Twitter @SCalLRev

The Southern California Law Review is the flagship scholarly journal of the USC Gould School of Law. The law review was established in 1927, and its students publish six issues in each annual volume.
