= Ganesh Sitaraman =

American law professor

- Employer: Vanderbilt University

Academic background
- Education: Harvard University (AB, JD); Emmanuel College, Cambridge (MPhil)

Ganesh Sitaraman is an American legal scholar. He is a professor of law at Vanderbilt University, where he has also been a Chancellor Faculty Fellow and the director of the Program in Law and Government. He studies constitutional and foreign relations law.

He is a longtime advisor to Elizabeth Warren, both before and during her political career. His books have addressed legal questions in counterinsurgency policy, the relationship between constitutional law and economic inequality, and the future of progressive politics in America.

== Early life and education ==
The son of Indian immigrants, Sitaraman attended Harvard College, graduating with an AB in 2004. As an undergraduate at Harvard, he was friends with classmate Pete Buttigieg, a future 2020 Democratic presidential candidate and Secretary of Transportation. Together they started a progressive reading group called the Democratic Renaissance Project.

In 2005, he graduated from Emmanuel College, Cambridge with an MPhil. He later returned to Harvard, where he obtained a JD from Harvard Law School in 2008. While at Harvard Law School, Sitaraman was mentored by future Senator and 2020 presidential candidate Elizabeth Warren.

== Career ==
In 2008, Sitaraman became a Public Law Fellow at Harvard Law School, and in 2010 he was a lecturer there. In 2011 he joined Vanderbilt Law School as a professor, where in 2017 he became the director of the Program on Law and Government.

From 2008 to 2009, Sitaraman was an advisor to Elizabeth Warren in her role on the Congressional Oversight Panel for the Troubled Asset Relief Program. In 2010 and 2011, he was a legal clerk for the U.S. Court of Appeals for the District of Columbia Circuit judge Stephen F. Williams.

Sitaraman was then the Policy Director for Elizabeth Warren during the 2012 United States Senate election in Massachusetts, and after her successful election as a United States Senator he worked as a senior counsel to her.

In August 2013, Sitaraman was named a senior fellow of the Center for American Progress. In 2016, he was a visiting associate professor of law at Yale Law School. In 2018, Sitaraman was named a Chancellor Faculty Fellow, a university-wide award for tenured professors.

As of 2024, Sitaraman chairs the board of directors of the magazine The American Prospect.

== Research ==
In addition to his academic articles and chapters in edited volumes, Sitaraman has written or edited several books. With Previn Warren, he was a co-editor of the 2003 book Invisible Citizens: Youth Politics after September 11.

Sitaraman's public scholarship has included publications in media outlets on topics like foreign policy. For example, he has advocated a shift in the foreign policy of the United States away from strict concern with national security towards a broader focus on the political economy of international wealth distribution. In 2018, Sitaraman was a recipient of the Andrew Carnegie Fellowship.

=== The Counterinsurgent's Constitution ===
In 2013, he published The Counterinsurgent's Constitution: Law in the Age of Small Wars. In The Counterinsurgent's Constitution, Sitaraman takes an interdisciplinary approach from fields including history, policy, and law to study the applicability of international law to counterinsurgency operations, with the intention of remaining readable for a general audience. The focus of counterinsurgency on strengthening legal and economic institutions means that legal questions are some of the core challenges for counterinsurgency policy, yet The Counterinsurgent's Constitution was the first book to connect counterinsurgency policy to the laws of warfare.

=== The Crisis of the Middle-class Constitution ===
In 2017, Sitaraman published The Crisis of the Middle-class Constitution: Why Economic Inequality Threatens our Republic. Sitaraman seeks to explain significant stresses that the American legal system is undergoing, and attributes these stresses to the collapse of the American middle class. Specifically, he studies the connection between the Constitution of the United States and economic inequality, arguing that the constitution is dependent on a substantial middle class to safeguard it, in contrast to constitutions that are created in conditions of economic inequality and encode rules to perpetuate that inequality.

Sitaraman argues that when significant economic inequality threatens the efficacy of the constitution, structural change is required in order to recover political stability; a successful historical example of this process is the Sixteenth Amendment to the United States Constitution which embedded reform in a fundamental legal modification, whereas the New Deal reformers were unsuccessful in the long run because the policy changes they pursued could eventually be reversed. The thesis of The Crisis of the Middle-class Constitution, which connects economic inequality with the quality and stability of American governance, was covered in several media outlets including The Atlantic, The Washington Post, and The New York Times, where it was discussed by Angus Deaton. The Crisis of the Middle-Class Constitution was named as one of the 100 Notable Books of 2017 by The New York Times, and was a recipient of a 2018 PROSE Award for Outstanding Work by a Trade Publisher.

=== Later work ===
Sitaraman published two books in 2019. With Anne L. Alstott, he published The Public Option: How to Expand Freedom, Increase Opportunity, and Promote Equality. He was also the author of the 2019 book The Great Democracy: How to Fix politics, Unrig the Economy, and Unite America. The Great Democracy describes a progressive platform for systemic change which is offered as an alternative to market-driven neoliberalism in the United States, including policy prescriptions for decreased barriers to citizen participation, expanded health care, legal reform, and climate policy.

In The Great Democracy Sitaraman continues to connect changes in contemporary American politics with developments in the American economy, arguing that a rigged economy has created a rigged politics, and that a change is needed in American politics on the order of historic movements like New Deal progressivism. The release of the book was covered by a number of media outlets, many of which discussed how the thesis of the book mirrored a debate then ongoing in the 2020 Democratic primary race: Sitaraman was a longtime advisor to Elizabeth Warren, who was then advancing a vision for structural change in line with Sitaraman's thesis, whereas Pete Buttigieg, Warren's rival for the nomination and Sitaraman's college friend, was widely seen as advocating a non-structural and policy-based response to the same problems. Sitaraman credited both as influences in the book.

== Selected works ==
- "Counterinsurgency, the War on Terror, and the Laws of War", Virginia Law Review (2009)
- The Counterinsurgent's Constitution: Law in the Age of Small Wars (2013)
- "The Puzzling Absence of Economic Power in Constitutional Theory", Cornell Law Review (2015)
- The Crisis of the Middle-Class Constitution: Why Economic Inequality Threatens our Republic (2017)
- The Great Democracy: How to Fix Politics, Unrig the Economy, and Unite America (2019)

== Selected awards ==
- Andrew Carnegie Fellowship (2018)
