= Alison LaCroix =

American legal scholar

Alison L. LaCroix

Academic background
- Education: Yale University (BA, JD); Harvard University (MA, PhD)

Academic work
- Discipline: Constitutional Law, History
- Institutions: The University of Chicago Law School; Debevoise & Plimpton

Alison L. LaCroix is the Robert Newton Reid Professor of Law at the University of Chicago Law School. She is also an Associate Member of the University of Chicago Department of History.

== Early life and education ==
LaCroix attended Yale College for her Bachelor of Arts degree in history, where she served as managing editor of the Yale Daily News and graduated summa cum laude in 1996. She then enrolled at Yale Law School for her Juris Doctor and served as essays editor of the Yale Law Journal, graduating in 1999. In 2001, she matriculated at Harvard University, where she received an MA in history in 2003 and a PhD in history in 2007.

== Career ==
Prior to joining the faculty at the University of Chicago Law School in 2006, LaCroix was an attorney at the New York law firm of Debevoise & Plimpton. She received tenure from the University of Chicago in 2011 and, in 2017, was awarded a National Endowment for the Humanities Fellowship in U.S. History for her project entitled, The Interbellum Constitution: Union, Commerce, and Slavery from the War of 1812 to the Civil War. On April 9, 2021, LaCroix was named a Commissioner on the Presidential Commission on the Supreme Court of the United States.

== Selected publications ==
- LaCroix, Alison L. "The Interbellum Constitution: Federalism in the Long Founding Moment". Stanford Law Review (2015): 397–445.
- LaCroix, Alison L. The Interbellum Constitution: Union, Commerce, and Slavery in the Age of Federalisms. New Haven, Connecticut: Yale University Press, 2024.
- LaCroix, Alison L. "The Shadow Powers of Article I." Yale Law Journal 123 (2013): 2044.
- LaCroix, Alison L. "Historical Gloss: A Primer." Harvard Law Review Forum 126 (2012): 75.
- LaCroix, Alison L. The Ideological Origins of American Federalism. Cambridge, Massachusetts: Harvard University Press, 2011.
- LaCroix, Alison L. "Federalists, Federalism, and Federal Jurisdiction." Law and History Review 30, no. 1 (2012): 205–244.
