= Virginia Law Review =

American law journal

- Discipline: Law, jurisprudence
- Language: English
- Edited by: Jong Myung (John) Lim

Publication details
- Former name: The Virginia Law Register
- History: 1913–present
- Publisher: The Virginia Law Review Association (United States)
- Frequency: 8/year
- Impact factor: 2.479 (2011)

Standard abbreviations
- Bluebook: Va. L. Rev.
- ISO 4: Va. Law Rev.

Indexing
- CODEN: VLIBAD
- ISSN: 0042-6601
- LCCN: 15013781
- OCLC no.: 470189621

Links
- Journal homepage

The Virginia Law Review is a law review edited and published by students at University of Virginia School of Law. It was established on March 15, 1913, and permanently organized later that year. The stated objective of the Virginia Law Review is "to publish a professional periodical devoted to law-related issues that can be of use to judges, practitioners, teachers, legislators, students, and others interested in the law." In addition to articles, the journal regularly publishes scholarly essays and student notes. A companion online publication, Virginia Law Review Online (formerly In Brief), has been in publication since 2007. The 2026–2027 editor-in-chief is Jong Myung (John) Lim.

The Virginia Law Review consistently ranks among the top ten most cited law journals. In addition, it is accessible on electronic databases such as Westlaw, LexisNexis, and HeinOnline.

== Notable articles ==
The following articles published in the Virginia Law Review are among "The Most-Cited Law Review Articles of All Time":

- Wilkinson, J. Harvie (2009). "Of Guns, Abortions, and the Unraveling Rule of Law" (PDF). Virginia Law Review. 95 (2): 253–323. JSTOR 25478705. Archived (PDF) from the original on 2026-01-13.
- Bebchuk, Lucian A. (2007). "The Myth of the Shareholder Franchise" (PDF). Virginia Law Review. 93 (3): 675–732. JSTOR 25050357. Archived (PDF) from the original on 2025-09-16.
- Sunstein, Cass R. (2006). "Chevron Step Zero" (PDF). Virginia Law Review. 92 (2): 187–249. JSTOR 4144979. Archived (PDF) from the original on 2026-03-26.
- Burk, Dan L.; Lemley, Mark A. (2003). "Policy Levers in Patent Law". Virginia Law Review. 89 (7): 1575–1696. doi:10.2307/3202360. JSTOR 3202360.
- Blair, Margaret M.; Stout, Lynn A. (1999). "A Team Production Theory of Corporate Law". Virginia Law Review. 85 (2): 247–328. doi:10.2307/1073662. hdl:1803/5806. JSTOR 1073662.
- Kahan, Dan (1997). "Social Influence, Social Meaning, and Deterrence". Virginia Law Review. 83 (2): 349–395. doi:10.2307/1073780. JSTOR 1073780.
- Thompson, William; Ford, Simon (1989). "DNA Typing: Acceptance and Weight of the New Genetic Identification Tests". Virginia Law Review. 75 (3): 45–108. doi:10.2307/1073218. JSTOR 1073218.
- Bartlett, Katharine T. (1984). "Rethinking Parenthood as an Exclusive Status: The Need for Legal Alternatives When the Premise of the Nuclear Family Has Failed". Virginia Law Review. 70 (5): 879–963. doi:10.2307/1072945. JSTOR 1072945.
- Gilson, Ronald J.; Kraakman, Reinier H. (1984). "The Mechanisms of Market Efficiency". Virginia Law Review. 70 (4): 549–644. doi:10.2307/1073080. JSTOR 1073080.
- Summers, Clyde W. (1976). "Individual Protection Against Unjust Dismissal: Time for a Statute". Virginia Law Review. 62 (3): 481–532. doi:10.2307/1072376. JSTOR 1072376.
