= List of University of Virginia School of Law alumni =

The University of Virginia School of Law is a public law school in Charlottesville, Virginia. Following is an incomplete list of its notable alumni.

== Academia ==
- Stephen Bainbridge (1985) – William D. Warren Distinguished Professor of Law, UCLA School of Law
- Richard Bonnie (1969) – Harrison Foundation Professor of Medicine and Law, University of Virginia Law School
- William S. Brewbaker III (1986) – dean, University of Alabama School of Law
- Hardy Cross Dillard (1927) – dean, UVA Law School; judge, International Court of Justice
- Charles M. Elson (1985) – Edgar S. Woolard Jr. Chair in Corporate Governance, professor of Finance, University of Delaware
- Jerry Falwell Jr. (1987) – president, Liberty University
- Patrick Finnegan (1979) – 12th academic dean of U.S. Military Academy and 25th president of Longwood University
- Gary Francione (1981) – Board of Governors Distinguished Professor of Law and Nicholas deB. Katzenbach Scholar of Law and Philosophy, Rutgers Law School
- Elizabeth Garrett (1988) – 13th president of Cornell University
- A.E. Dick Howard (1961) – White Burkett Miller Distinguished Professor of Law and Public Affairs, University of Virginia Law School
- John Jeffries (1973) – 12th dean and David and Mary Harrison Distinguished Professor of Law, University of Virginia Law School
- Leslie C. Kendrick (2006) – 13th dean of the University of Virginia School of Law and Arnold H. Leon Professor of Law
- Lee B. Kovarsky (2004) – Bryan Smith Chair in Law and co-director of the Capital Punishment Center, University of Texas School of Law
- Andrew Leipold (1985) – Edwin M. Adams Professor of Law, University of Illinois College of Law
- M. Elizabeth Magill (1995) – provost of the University of Virginia, 13th dean of Stanford Law School
- Dayna Bowen Matthew – 20th dean of the George Washington University Law School
- Michael McCann (2002) – founding director of the UNH Law Sports and Entertainment Law Institute, University of New Hampshire School of Law
- William Ephraim Mikell (1894) – dean of the University of Pennsylvania Law School
- Blake Morant (1978) – dean and Robert Kramer Research Professor, George Washington University Law School
- James Pfander (1982) – Owen L. Coon Professor of Law, Northwestern University Pritzker School of Law
- W. Taylor Reveley, III (1968) – president, The College of William and Mary, former dean and law professor at William & Mary Law School
- W. Taylor Reveley IV (2002) – 26th president of Longwood University
- Jacob Rooksby (2007) – dean of Gonzaga University School of Law
- James E. Ryan (1992) – president of the University of Virginia
- Micah Schwartzman (2005) – Hardy Cross Dillard Professor of Law, University of Virginia Law School
- David Skeel (1987) – S. Samuel Arsht Professor of Corporate Law, University of Pennsylvania Law School
- Lyon Gardiner Tyler (1877) – president of the College of William & Mary
- Joyce Vance (1985) – distinguished professor of the practice of law, University of Alabama School of Law
- Paul R. Verkuil (1967) – former president of College of William & Mary and former dean of Cardozo Law School; chairman, Administrative Conference of the United States

== Business ==
- Donald Dell (1964) – founder of ProServ
- Eppa Hunton Jr. (1877) – founder of Hunton & Williams, president of the Richmond, Fredericksburg and Potomac Railroad
- Eppa Hunton IV (1927) – senior partner, chairman of the executive committee of Hunton & Williams
- Bruce Karsh (1980) – investor, founder and co-chairman of Oaktree Capital Management, executive board member of Golden State Warriors
- Peter S. Kaufman (1978) – investment banker, president of the Gordian Group LLC
- Deborah Platt Majoras (1989) – vice president and general counsel, Procter & Gamble
- Ted Mathas (1992) – chairman, president, and CEO, New York Life Insurance Company
- Alexander F. Mathews (1856) – president and founder of Bank of Lewisburg and First National Bank of Ronceverte
- John E. Osborn (1983) – former executive vice president and general counsel, Cephalon, Inc.; former member, U.S. Advisory Commission on Public Diplomacy
- Beth Wilkinson (1987) – founding partner, specialty trial and litigation law firm Wilkinson Stekloff

== Civil rights and nonprofit ==
- J. Richard Cohen (1979) – former president and legal director of Southern Poverty Law Center
- Michael LeMoyne Kennedy (1984) – manager of the nonprofit organization Citizens Energy; son of Robert F. Kennedy
- Robert F. Kennedy Jr. (1979) – chairman of Children's Health Defense; son of Robert F. Kennedy
- Coke Morgan Stewart (1997) – CEO and president of the Council for Innovation Promotion

== Entertainment ==
- Lee Habeeb (1991) – conservative talk radio producer
- Laura Ingraham (1991) – radio talk–show host
- Andrew Scheinman (1973) – movie producer
- Will Shortz (1977) – crossword editor, The New York Times
- Bob Wright (1968) – former chairman and CEO of NBC

== Government ==
- Jeff Bartos (1997) – United States ambassador to the United Nations for Management and Reform
- Andrew S. Boutros (2001) – U.S. attorney, Northern District of Illinois
- John Bridgeland (1987) – director, USA Freedom Corps
- Mortimer Caplin (1940) – former commissioner, U.S. Internal Revenue Service
- Harmeet K. Dhillon (1993) – U.S. assistant attorney general for the Civil Rights Division
- Andrew N. Ferguson (2012) – chairman, Federal Trade Commission
- Doug Gansler (1989) – attorney general of Maryland
- Lee E. Goodman (1990) – chairman, Federal Election Commission
- Todd Graves (1991) – U.S. attorney, Western District of Missouri
- Jamieson L. Greer (2007) – 20th U.S. trade representative
- Tim Heaphy (1991) – U.S. attorney, Western District of Virginia
- Pete Holmes (1984) – Seattle city attorney
- Cole Jester (2022) – 35th secretary of state of Arkansas
- Brendan Johnson (2001) – U.S. attorney, District of South Dakota
- Max Kennedy (1992) – board of directors of the Overseas Private Investment Corporation; son of Robert F. Kennedy and nephew of John F. Kennedy and Ted Kennedy
- Edwin Kneedler (1975) – deputy United States solicitor general
- Zane David Memeger (1991) – U.S. attorney, Eastern District of Pennsylvania (2010–2016)
- David Metcalf (2012) – U.S. attorney for the Eastern District of Pennsylvania.
- Robert Mueller (1973) – director of the Federal Bureau of Investigation
- Trevor Potter (1982) – chairman of Federal Election Commission
- Scott A. Surovell (1996) – Senate majority leader, Virginia State Senate
- Joyce White Vance (1985) – U.S. attorney, Northern District of Alabama
- Andy Vollmer (1978) – acting general counsel, United States Securities and Exchange Commission
- James B. Whitfield (1886) – state attorney general, justice of the Supreme Court of Florida
- Michael C. Wholley (1977) – general counsel, NASA
- Frank Wisner (1934) – head of the Office of Strategic Services and head of the Directorate of Plans of the CIA during the 1950s

== Judiciary ==
- G. Steven Agee (1977) – judge, United States Court of Appeals for the Fourth Circuit
- Carol Amon (1971) – judge, U.S. District Court for the Eastern District of New York
- John Antoon (2001, LL.M) – judge, United States District Court for the Middle District of Florida
- Lewis Babcock (1998, LL.M) – judge, United States District Court for the District of Colorado
- Shepard Barclay (1869) – justice of the Supreme Court of Missouri
- Alice M. Batchelder (1988) – chief judge, United States Court of Appeals for the Sixth Circuit
- Peter Beer (1986, LL.M) – judge, United States District Court for the Eastern District of Louisiana
- Robert Beezer (1956) – judge, United States Court of Appeals for the Ninth Circuit
- Carol A. Beier (2004, LL.M) – judge, Kansas Supreme Court
- Robert Benham (1990, LL.M) – judge, Georgia Supreme Court
- Duane Benton (1995, LL.M) – judge, United States Court of Appeals for the Eighth Circuit
- Susan H. Black (1984) – judge, United States Court of Appeals for the Eleventh Circuit
- Pasco Bowman II (1979, LL.M) – judge, United States Court of Appeals for the Eighth Circuit
- Mary Beck Briscoe (1990, LL.M) – chief judge, U.S. Court of Appeals for the Tenth Circuit
- John White Brockenbrough – judge, United States District Court for the Western District of Virginia, founder and former dean of the Washington and Lee University School of Law
- John T. Broderick Jr. (1972) – chief justice, New Hampshire Supreme Court
- Janice Rogers Brown (2004, LL.M) – judge, United States Court of Appeals for the District of Columbia Circuit
- James O. Browning (1981) – judge, United States District Court for the District of New Mexico
- Albert Vickers Bryan (1921) – judge, United States Court of Appeals for the Fourth Circuit
- John D. Butzner Jr. (1941, LL.M) – judge, United States Court of Appeals for the Fourth Circuit
- Consuelo María Callahan (2004, LL.M) – judge, United States Court of Appeals for the Ninth Circuit
- Jack Tarpley Camp Jr. (1973) – judge, United States District Court for the Northern District of Georgia
- Ronald D. Castille (1971) – chief justice, Pennsylvania Supreme Court
- Robert J. Conrad (1983) – judge, United States District Court for the Western District of North Carolina
- Julian Abele Cook Jr. (1988, LL.M) – judge, United States District Court for the Eastern District of Michigan
- James L. Dennis (1984) – judge, United States Court of Appeals for the Fifth Circuit
- Hardy Cross Dillard (1927) – judge, International Court of Justice; dean, UVA Law School
- Daniel D. Domenico (2000) judge, United States Court of Appeals for the Tenth Circuit
- Robert D. Durham (1998, LL.M) – justice, Oregon Supreme Court
- James Larry Edmondson (1990, LL.M) – judge, United States Court of Appeals for the Eleventh Circuit
- Richard Alan Enslen (1986, LL.M) – judge, United States District Court for the Western District of Michigan
- Orinda D. Evans (1998, LL.M) – judge, United States District Court for the Northern District of Georgia
- John A. Field Jr. (1935) – judge, United States Court of Appeals for the Fourth Circuit
- Louise W. Flanagan (1988) – judge, United States District Court for the Eastern District of North Carolina
- Paul C. Gartzke (1992) – presiding judge, Wisconsin Court of Appeals
- Julia Smith Gibbons (1975) – judge, United States Court of Appeals for the Sixth Circuit
- John A. Gibney Jr. (1976) – judge, United States District Court for the Eastern District of Virginia
- Patricia Tolliver Giles (1998) – judge, United States District Court for the Eastern District of Virginia
- John Gleeson (1980) – judge, United States District Court for the Eastern District of New York
- George H. Goodrich (1952) – judge, Superior Court of the District of Columbia
- Thomas B. Griffith (1985) – judge, United States Court of Appeals for the District of Columbia Circuit
- Asher Grunis (1972, LL.M) – president, Supreme Court of Israel
- Michael Daly Hawkins (1998, LL.M) – judge, United States Court of Appeals for the Ninth Circuit
- Michael J. Hendershot (2001) – judge, United States District Court for the Northern District of Ohio
- Toby J. Heytens (2000) – judge, United States Court of Appeals for the Fourth Circuit
- Sven Erik Holmes (1980) – judge, United States District Court for the Northern District of Oklahoma
- William W. Hood III (1990) – justice, Colorado Supreme Court
- Virginia Hopkins (1977) – judge, United States District Court for the Northern District of Alabama
- Lynn Nettleton Hughes (1992, LL.M) – judge, United States District Court for the Southern District of Texas
- Willis Hunt (1990, LL.M) – judge, United States District Court for the Northern District of Georgia
- Yuji Iwasawa (1997, S.J.D.) – president, International Court of Justice
- Raymond Alvin Jackson (1973) – judge, United States District Court for the Eastern District of Virginia
- Denise R. Johnson (LL.M., 1995) – first woman appointed to the Vermont Supreme Court
- James Parker Jones (1965) – chief judge, United States District Court for the Western District of Virginia
- Daniel Porter Jordan III (1993) – judge, United States District Court for the Southern District of Mississippi
- Barbara Milano Keenan (1992, LL.M) – judge, United States Court of Appeals for the Fourth Circuit
- James Kinkeade (1998, LL.M.) – judge, United States District Court for the Northern District of Texas
- Cynthia D. Kinser (1977) – chief justice, Supreme Court of Virginia
- Jeannette Knoll (Master of Laws, 1996) – associate justice of the Louisiana Supreme Court
- Benson Everett Legg (1973) – judge, U.S. District Court for the District of Maryland
- Peter K. Leisure (1958) – judge, United States District Court for the Southern District of New York
- Donald Lemons (1976) – chief justice Supreme Court of Virginia
- Stephen N. Limbaugh Jr. (1998, LL.M) – judge, United States District Court for the Eastern District of Missouri
- Kermit Lipez (1990, LL.M.) – judge, United States Court of Appeals for the First Circuit
- J. Michael Luttig (1981) – former judge, United States Court of Appeals for the Fourth Circuit and current senior vice president and general counsel at Boeing Co.
- Blanche M. Manning (1992, LL.M) – judge, United States District Court for the Northern District of Illinois
- Boyce F. Martin Jr. (1963, LL.M) – judge, United States Court of Appeals for the Sixth Circuit
- Mark D. Martin (1998) – judge, North Carolina Supreme Court
- Trevor N. McFadden (2006) – judge, United States District Court for the District of Columbia
- James Clark McReynolds (1884) – former justice, United States Supreme Court
- Amit Priyavadan Mehta (1997) – judge, United States District Court for the District of Columbia
- Paul Redmond Michel (1966) – chief judge, United States Court of Appeals for the Federal Circuit
- Donald M. Middlebrooks (2004, LL.M) – judge, United States District Court for the Southern District of Florida
- Michael P. Mills (2001, LL.M) – judge, United States District Court for the Northern District of Mississippi
- Richard Henry Mills (1982, LL.M) – judge, United States District Court for the Central District of Illinois
- Norman K. Moon (1988, LL.M) – judge, United States District Court for the Western District of Virginia
- William Theodore Moore Jr. (2001, LL.M) – judge, United States District Court for the Southern District of Georgia
- John T. Morton (1994) – assistant secretary, United States Immigration and Customs Enforcement
- Diana Gribbon Motz (1968) – judge, United States Court of Appeals for the Fourth Circuit
- J. Frederick Motz (1967) – judge, United States District Court for the District of Maryland
- Glenn Murdock (1981) – justice, Supreme Court of Alabama
- Michael S. Nachmanoff (1995) – judge, United States District Court for the Eastern District of Virginia
- John B. Nalbandian (1994) – judge, United States Court of Appeals for the Sixth Circuit
- Alan Eugene Norris (1986) – judge, United States Court of Appeals for the Sixth Circuit
- Donal O'Donnell (1983, LL.M) – chief justice of Ireland, Supreme Court of Ireland
- Diarmuid O'Scannlain (1992, LL.M) – judge, United States Court of Appeals for the Ninth Circuit
- John Pelander (1998, LL.M) – justice, Supreme Court of Arizona
- Cleo E. Powell (1982) – chief justice, Supreme Court of Virginia
- Stanley Forman Reed (1908) – former justice, United States Supreme Court
- Carlton W. Reeves (1989) – judge, United States District Court for the Southern District of Mississippi
- Kenneth Francis Ripple (1968) – judge, United States Court of Appeals for the Seventh Circuit
- Judith Ann Wilson Rogers (1988, LL.M) – judge, United States Court of Appeals for the District of Columbia Circuit
- John Roll (1990, LL.M) – judge, United States District Court for the District of Arizona
- Robert D. Rucker (1998, LL.M) – judge, Indiana Supreme Court
- Thomas G. Saylor (2004, LL.M) – judge, Pennsylvania Supreme Court
- Michael H. Schneider Sr. (2001, LL.M) – judge, United States District Court for the Eastern District of Texas
- Arthur J. Schwab (1972) – judge, United States District Court for the Western District of Pennsylvania
- Murray Merle Schwartz (1982, LL.M) – judge, United States District Court for the District of Delaware
- Leah Ward Sears (1995, LL.M) – chief justice, Georgia Supreme Court
- G. Kendall Sharp (1963) – judge, United States District Court for the Middle District of Florida
- Robert J. Shelby (1988) – judge, United States District Court for the District of Utah
- Randall Terry Shepard (1995 LL.M) – chief justice, Indiana Supreme Court
- Eugene E. Siler Jr. (1963) – judge, United States Court of Appeals for the Sixth Circuit
- Edward Samuel Smith (1947) – judge, United States Court of Appeals for the Federal Circuit
- William Lloyd Standish (1956) – judge, United States District Court for the Western District of Pennsylvania
- Louis L. Stanton (1955) – judge, United States District Court for the Southern District of New York
- Walter King Stapleton (1984, LL.M) – judge, United States Court of Appeals for the Third Circuit
- Myron T. Steele (1970) – chief justice, Delaware Supreme Court
- Chester J. Straub (1961) – judge, United States Court of Appeals for the Second Circuit
- Richard F. Suhrheinrich (1990, LL.M) – Senior judge, United States Court of Appeals for the Sixth Circuit
- Richard Barclay Surrick (1982, LL.M) – judge, United States District Court for the Eastern District of Pennsylvania
- Debra Todd (2004, LL.M) – judge, Pennsylvania Supreme Court
- Juan R. Torruella (1984, LL.M) – judge, United States Court of Appeals for the First Circuit
- Jamar K. Walker (2011) – judge, United States District Court for the Eastern District of Virginia
- James B. Whitfield (1886) – state attorney general, justice of the Supreme Court of Florida
- Michael J. Wilkins (2001, LL.M) – associate chief justice, Utah Supreme Court
- J. Harvie Wilkinson (1972) – judge, United States Court of Appeals for the Fourth Circuit
- Glen Morgan Williams (1948) – judge, United States District Court for the Western District of Virginia
- Victor J. Wolski (1991) – judge, United States Court of Federal Claims
- James Andrew Wynn (1995, LL.M) – judge, United States Court of Appeals for the Fourth Circuit

== Literature and journalism ==
- Louis Auchincloss (1941) – novelist
- David Baldacci (1986) – novelist
- Linda Fairstein (1972) – novelist
- Emily Giffin (1997) – novelist
- Philip K. Howard (1974) – writer
- Robert Wood Lynn (2012) – poet and winner of Yale Younger Poets Prize
- Lucien D. Starke Jr. (1899) – president and publisher of the Norfolk Virginian-Pilot
- Evan Thomas (1977) – editor, Newsweek

== Politics ==
- Charles C. Adams Jr. (1973) – U.S. ambassador to Finland
- George Allen (1977) – U.S. congressman and senator from Virginia and 67th governor of Virginia
- J. Lindsay Almond (1923) – 58th governor of Virginia; judge, United States Court of Appeals for the Federal Circuit
- Nathan L. Bachman (1903) – U.S. senator from Tennessee
- Gerald Baliles (1967) – 65th governor of Virginia
- Alben W. Barkley (1900) – U.S. senator from Kentucky, vice president of the United States
- John S. Battle (1913) – 56th governor of Virginia
- Robert Bauer (1976) – White House counsel, general counsel of the Obama Campaign
- Evan Bayh (1981) – U.S. senator and governor of Indiana
- Andy Beshear (2003) – governor of Kentucky (2019–present), attorney general of Kentucky (2015–2019)
- Kit Bond (1963) – U.S. senator and governor of Missouri
- Rick Boucher (1971) – U.S. congressman from Virginia
- Debra Bowen (1979) – secretary of state of California
- Alan Stephenson Boyd (1948) – U.S. secretary of transportation
- Harry F. Byrd Jr. (1936) – U.S. senator from Virginia
- Millard F. Caldwell (1924) – U.S. congressman and governor of Florida
- Bryan Callaghan Jr. (1874) – mayor of San Antonio, Texas for 16 years
- Edward M. Carmouche (1948) – chairman of the Louisiana Democratic Party 1966–1968; attorney in Lake Charles, Louisiana
- Robin Carnahan (1986) – Missouri secretary of state
- Simon Cataldo (2014) – Massachusetts state representative for the 14th Middlesex
- James Paul Clarke (1878) – U.S. senator and governor of Arkansas
- John Cornyn (1995) – U.S. senator from Texas and Senate majority whip, attorney general of Texas
- John N. Dalton (1957) – 63rd governor of Virginia
- Tom Davis (1975) – U.S. congressman from Virginia
- S. Hubert Dent Jr. – former U.S. congressman for the 2nd District of Alabama and chairman of the House Committee on Military Affairs during World War I
- Frank M. Dixon (1943) – governor of Alabama
- Tom Donilon (1985) – U.S. National Security advisor
- Paul Erickson (1988) – conservative political operative, subject to federal investigation into Russian interference in the 2016 United States elections
- Fred Fielding (1964) – White House counsel
- William Meade Fishback (1855) – governor of Arkansas
- Randy Forbes (1977) – U.S. congressman from Virginia
- Luis G. Fortuño (1985) – governor of Puerto Rico
- Grenville Gaines (1876) – mayor of Warrenton, Virginia
- Jim Gilmore (1977) – 68th governor of Virginia
- Mills Godwin (1940) – 60th & 62nd governor of Virginia
- Virgil Goode (1973) – U.S. Congressman from Virginia
- Albertis Harrison (1928) – 59th governor of Virginia
- Frederick W. M. Holliday (1848) – 38th governor of Virginia
- Melvin Hollowell (1984) – chair of the Michigan Democratic Party
- William J. Howell (1967) – speaker of the Virginia House of Delegates
- Bob Inglis (1984) – U.S. congressman from South Carolina
- Sheila Jackson-Lee (1975) – U.S. congresswoman from Texas
- Jay Jones (2015) – 49th attorney general of Virginia
- John Neely Kennedy (1977) – U.S. senator from Louisiana
- Robert F. Kennedy (1951) – attorney general of the United States, U.S. senator from New York, 1968 Democratic presidential candidate
- Ted Kennedy (1959) – U.S. senator from Massachusetts, 1980 Democratic presidential candidate
- Angus King (1969) – U.S. senator and former governor of Maine
- Deborah Platt Majoras (1989) – chairman of the Federal Trade Commission
- Sean Patrick Maloney (1992) – U.S. congressman from New York
- Thurgood Marshall Jr. (1981) – cabinet secretary under U.S. President Bill Clinton
- Jennifer McClellan (1997) – U.S. congresswoman from Virginia, Virginia Senate, Virginia House of Delegates
- Donald McEachin (1986) – U.S. congressman from Virginia
- George McMillan (1979) – lieutenant governor of Alabama, Alabama Senate, Alabama House of Representatives
- Andrew Jackson Montague (1885) – 44th governor of Virginia
- Janet Napolitano (1983) – U.S. secretary of Homeland Security, governor of Arizona, president of the University of California
- Bill Nelson (1968) – U.S. senator from Florida
- Kirstjen Nielsen (1999) – U.S. secretary of Homeland Security
- Chris Obenshain (2006) – Virginia state delegate from the 41st district
- Walter Tansill Oliver (1873–1932) – state delegate and state senator from Virginia; mayor of Fairfax, Virginia
- Henry A. Osborn Jr. (1884–1918) – politician
- Ken Paxton (1991) – attorney general of Texas
- W. Robert Pearson (1968) – U.S. ambassador to Turkey
- Matthew S. Petersen (1999) – commissioner and former chairman, Federal Election Commission
- Heather Podesta (1997) – lobbyist
- Charles Robb (1973) – U.S. senator and 64th governor of Virginia
- Franklin Delano Roosevelt Jr. (1940) – U.S. congressman from New York, and son of President of the United States Franklin D. Roosevelt
- Hugh D. Scott (1922) – U.S. senator from Pennsylvania; Minority Leader of the United States Senate
- Faryar Shirzad – advisor to U.S. President George W. Bush
- Howard Worth Smith (1903) – U.S. congressman from Virginia
- John C. Stennis (1927) – U.S. senator from Mississippi
- Harry F. Stimpson Jr. – ambassador to Paraguay
- Claude A. Swanson (1886) – 45th governor of Virginia
- John V. Tunney (1959) – U.S. senator from California
- John Warner (1953) – U.S. senator from Virginia
- Tahesha Way (1996) – 3rd lieutenant governor of New Jersey
- Lowell P. Weicker Jr. (1958) – U.S. senator and governor of Connecticut
- Sheldon Whitehouse (1982) – U.S. senator from Rhode Island
- Woodrow Wilson (attended 1879) – president of the United States

== Science ==
- Susan Kolb (dropped out) – medical doctor and author

== Sports ==
- Griff Aldrich (1999) – head men's basketball coach, Longwood University
- Tim Finchem (1973) – commissioner and CEO, PGA TOUR
- Bowie Kuhn (1950) – former Major League Baseball commissioner
- Doug Perlman (1993) – founder and CEO of Sports Media Advisors, former EVP, Media for the NHL
- Matt Simpson (2020) – Paralympic goalball player
- Michael Slive (1965) – former commissioner of the Southeastern Conference (SEC), former first commissioner of both Conference USA and Great Midwest Conference
- DeMaurice Smith (1989) – executive director, National Football League Players' Association
- Don Yee (1987) – NFL sports agent
