= Economic interdependence =

Mutual dependence of parties that trade within an economic system

Economic interdependence is the mutual dependence of the participants in an economic system who trade in order to obtain the products they cannot produce efficiently for themselves. Such trading relationships require that the behavior of a participant affects its trading partners and it would be costly to rupture their relationship. The subject was addressed by A. A. Cournot who wrote: "...but in reality the economic system is a whole in which all of the parts are connected and react on one another. An increase in the income of the producers of commodity A will affect the demands for commodities B, C, etc. and the incomes of their producers, and by its reaction will affect the demand for commodity A." Economic Interdependence is evidently a consequence of the division of labour.

David Baldwin conceptualizes international economic interdependence as the opportunity costs incurred from potential exit costs that incur as a result of breaking existing economic ties between nations. Others argue that it entails the degree of sensitivity of a country's economic behavior to policies and development of countries outside its border. Global economic interdependence has grown in the post-World War II period as a result of technological progress (e.g. computerization, containerization, low-cost travel, low-cost communications) and associated policies that were aimed at opening national economies internally and externally to global competition. By some measures, trade interdependence has not increased since the late 20th century.

Some international relations scholars posit that economic interdependence contributes to peaceful relations between states. Other scholars argue that the relationship is more nuanced or emphasize the ways in which interdependence can contribute to conflict between states. For example, through their work on "weaponized interdependence", Abraham Newman and Henry Farrell have outlined how states that possess effective jurisdiction over central economic nodes can use these nodes for coercive economic leverage against adversaries. Victor Cha has argued that economic interdependence in East Asia can both be a tool of coercion by China but can also be exploited by China's neighbors to deter China if they all work together against China.

== Economic interdependence and conflict ==
International relations scholars are divided as to whether economic interdependence contributes to peace or conflict. Statistical analyses indicate that economic interdependence can lead both to war and peace, with various factors that condition the effect of interdependence. Dale C. Copeland argues that expectations about future trade affects whether economic interdependence is likely to lead to peace or conflict; when leaders do not believe that future trade patterns will be favorable, they are more likely to engage in conflict and competition than when they believe that future trade patterns will be beneficial to their state. According to Henry Farrell and Abraham L. Newman, states can "weaponize interdependence" by fighting over control of important nodes in global networks of informational and financial exchange. Realists such as John Mearsheimer and Joseph Grieco argue that interdependence increase the risk of conflict by creating dependencies and vulnerabilities that states will seek to rid themselves off; for example, states will fear that other states cut off access to key resources.

Beth Simmons and Patrick McDonald argue that interdependence creates groups in liberal capitalist states with vested interests in the status quo, which makes conflict less likely. However, illiberal states or states where domestic groups benefit from trade barriers may be more likely to end up in conflict over trade relations. According to Stephen G. Brooks, globalization of production has had a pacifying impact on great powers by (i) making it hard for great powers to have cutting-edge military technology without being part of global supply chains, (ii) reducing incentives to conquer the territory of economically advanced countries, and (iii) facilitating regional integration.

The outbreak of World War I during a period of unprecedented globalization and economic interdependence has often been cited as an example of how economic interdependence fails to prevent war or even contributes to it. Other scholars dispute that World War I was a failure for liberal theory.

According to a 2005 assessment of existing research, the existing research indicated that trade linkages reduce conflict.

== Approaches to measure international economic interdependence ==
As economic interdependence may be perceived differently depending on the scale and context involved, various methods are used to measure the degree of interdependence between and within countries. The below documents some of the approaches that have been adopted to measure the degree of economic interdependence.

=== Hierarchical Network Approach ===
This approach is based on the precept that globalisation increases the integration and interdependence between the economy of different countries. The Hierarchical Network Approach is used to measure economic interdependence by analysing growth clusters and cross-country liaison, and business cycle synchronisations. The cross-country liaison or economic interaction between countries or states is most commonly measured by Pearson's cross-correlation coefficient. The correlation matrix is a methodical method which exhibits the mutual relationship of countries over a specified time period. To measure growth clusters, economists need to get hold and analyse changes in GDP for each country over a specified period of time. The relationship between interdependence and business cycles is calculated by the distance correlation matrices over a period of 10 years. The combination of results from the data presents the economic interdependence of countries over time. By this measure, trends from the data has shown that the degree of world economic interdependence is growing due to globalisation.

=== Geopolitical Approach ===
Another way of measuring the degree of economic interdependence is via a geopolitical approach, which is based on the presumption that economic interdependence may exist because states trade with each other to obtain strategic goods that are needed for national industry and defence. The geopolitical approach is based on both vertical and horizontal interdependence. Vertical interdependence measures how a change in the price of a good in Country X will affect Country Y (or how changes in price in State A will affect State B), whilst horizontal interdependence calculates the degree of bilateral trade, transactions and investment involved between both countries. Both vertical and horizontal interdependence data must be used to measure economic interdependence. This is because that in the given situation that there is a high correlation of vertical interdependence between country X and country Y, if there is no horizontal interdependence (transaction of goods, services or capitals) between both countries, country X and country Y will have little/no economic interdependence. Vertical interdependence without horizontal may arise due to other factors such as changes in worldwide economic forces. For instance, consider the case of trade and the flow of factors among Arab states (which is typically very limited); whilst we observe parallel movements in factor prices, this may just be due to the effect of global market forces that affect all economies in the same fashion.

=== Exit Model Approach ===
As suggested by Baldwin and Crescenzi, economic interdependence may be modelled as a function of potential economic exit costs, which may deter, motivate or fail to affect political conflict. A key challenge that is faced is the need for a valid method to measure exit costs and interdependence, whilst maintaining a systematic approach with many countries involved (a large-n analysis). Crescenzi addresses this by interacting bilateral price elasticity data with trade activity data, to represent both market structure and the intensity of potential economic exit costs. Whilst the price elasticity data reflects one state's ability to react to economic change that is initiated by another state, its interaction with trade share data is vital as it indicates how intense the interdependent relationship is relative to each state's economy and trade portfolio within the global market. Given these two components, Crescenzi furthers his study by explaining the relationship between economic interdependence and its association with political conflict.
