= Geoeconomics =

Study of the interrelations of economics, geography and politics

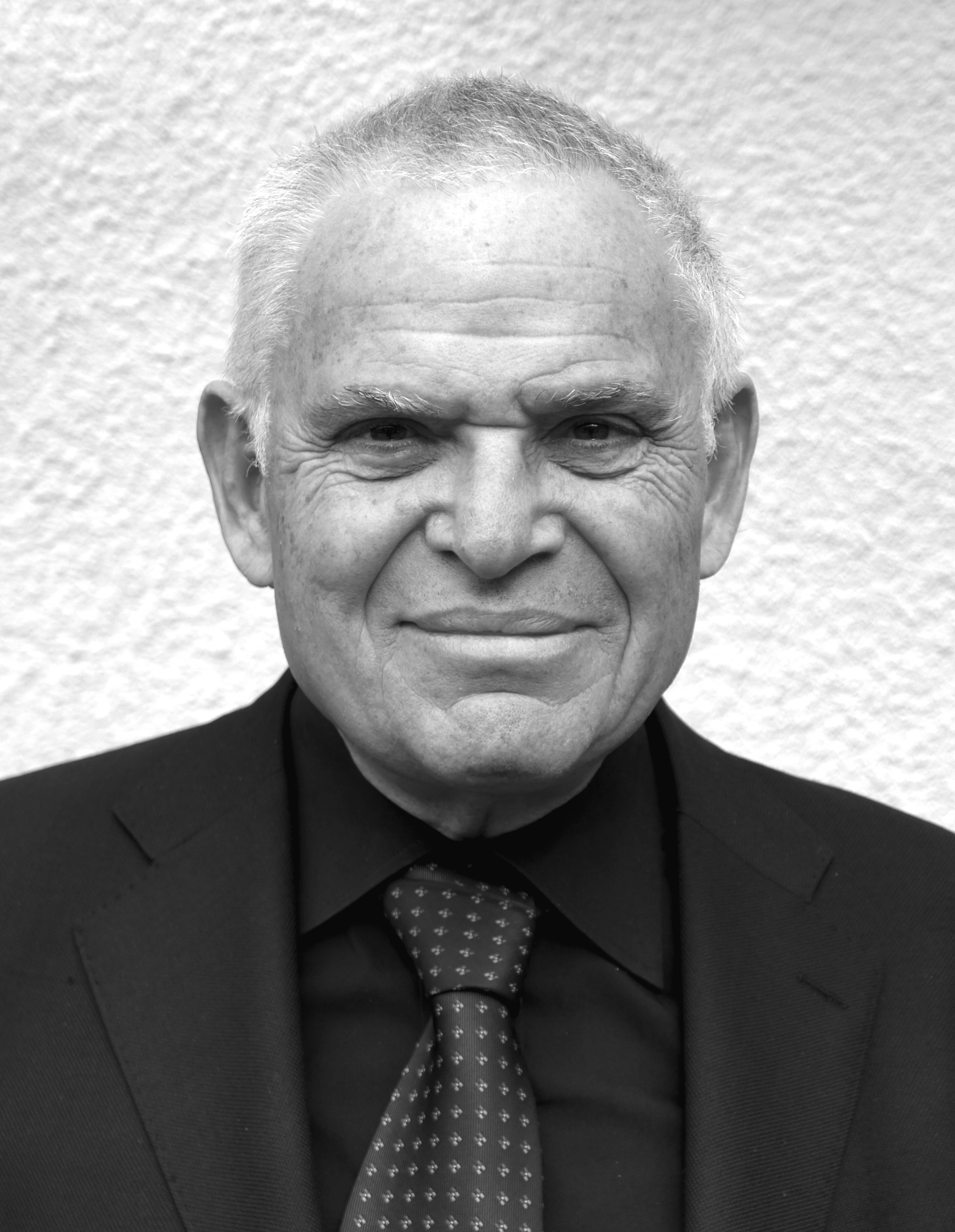
Edward Luttwak was among the first post-Cold War contributors to the idea that the future of geopolitical competition would extend into the economic sphere.

Geoeconomics (sometimes geo-economics) commonly refers to analytical frameworks used to assess the strategic spatial properties of national economies or the economic means of statecraft of particular territories in relation to others. Geoeconomics also serves as a strategic discourse and practice in foreign policy, where it is primarily informed by realist and mercantilist traditions. It emphasizes how states can leverage economic power, financial networks, and supply chains to pursue national interests, influence other countries, and shape global order. However, geoeconomics lacks a universally agreed definition, and its usage varies across academic, policy, and journalistic contexts. Some see it as an alternative framework to geopolitics, while others treat it as a complementary or subordinate approach.

The coining of geoeconomics and the distinction of geoeconomics from geopolitics has long been falsely attributed to Edward Luttwak, an American grand strategist and military consultant, who popularized the term at the end of the Cold War. Yet, as historical research has shown, there have been numerous attempts to establish geoeconomics as a distinct field of research, a foreign policy tool, and a political program since the beginning of the 20th century, particularly in Germany and the United States. The first comprehensive elaboration of geoeconomics dates back to 1925 and was published by the German national-conservative writer Arthur Dix.

== Historical Overview ==
While the term "geoeconomics" rose to prominence in the 1990s, particularly through Edward Luttwak's writings, its conceptual roots trace back to the early 20th century, only a few years after Rudolf Kjellén coined the term geopolitics. The history of geoeconomics reveals a long-standing interest in articulating the spatial and strategic dimensions of economic life, often in parallel with or in response to geopolitical reasoning.

One of the earliest comprehensive treatments of geoeconomics was developed by German national-conservative writer Arthur Dix in a 1925 monograph. Dix explicitly framed geoeconomics as a complement to geopolitics, arguing that political geography alone could not adequately explain or direct national economic development. His vision included systematic surveys of global energy and trade flows to inform economic statecraft. However, Dix's work never gained the traction that geopolitics did. As geopolitician Karl Haushofer noted in 1928, geopolitics proved far more compatible with the popular press and the emerging strategic cultures of the interwar period.

In the same era, Wilhelm Röpke—later a member of the Mont Pelerin Society—argued that the term "economic geography" was too narrow to account for the full complexity of spatial-economic conditions. If business cycles constituted the temporal object of political economy, he wrote, then a spatial correlate was needed. He proposed that "geoeconomics" could address those phenomena "characterized by a horizontal-geographic relationality and boundedness to the physically, historically, sociologically, and politically conditioned variegations of space."

In the United States, geoeconomic thinking also emerged before World War II. In 1919, American geographer Whitbeck proposed the foundation of a "science of geonomics" to study spatial economic patterns as a guide for national development. In 1941, Geologist Richard Field advocated for geoeconomics as a peaceful alternative to "geowar," emphasizing resource control and international cooperation. In 1943, Lewis Lorwin explicitly contrasted "geo-economics" with "geo-politics," arguing that economic rather than territorial thinking should underpin the emerging postwar world order and United Nations policy.

During the Cold War, geoeconomics was used sporadically, including in curricula at the Industrial College of the Armed Forces in Washington, D.C. The school described geoeconomics as "an analysis of the position of American economy in relation to the economies of other nations."

Following Luttwak's popular 1990 essay, it was only in the post-Cold War era that the term "geoeconomics" entered widespread use. Institutions such as the Council on Foreign Relations (through its Greenberg Center), the Atlantic Council, and the Institut Choiseul began to promote geoeconomics as a strategic framework in foreign policy. These efforts framed geoeconomics primarily around the use of trade, finance, investment, and sanctions as tools of statecraft.

In a 2024 retrospective commentary, Edward Luttwak acknowledged that his original formulation of geoeconomics was offered without knowledge of its earlier usages.

== "The logic of conflict in the grammar of commerce" ==
Luttwak argues that the same logic that underlies military conflict also pertains to international commerce:

- States seek to collect as much in revenue as their fiscal codes prescribe and are not content to let other states tax commercial activity in the former's purview. This is a zero-sum game.
- States predominantly regulate economic activity to maximize outcomes within their own borders, rather than for a disinterested transnational purpose, even when the outcome is suboptimal for other states. The logic of state regulation then conforms, in part, to logic of conflict.
- States and blocs of states strive to restrict their payouts and services to their own residents. Moreover, states design their infrastructure projects to optimize domestic utility, regardless of how other states are affected, as opposed to the transnational utility.
- States or blocs of states promote technological innovation to maximize benefits within their own boundaries, rather than for the sake of innovation itself.

== Geoeconomics vs. geopolitics ==
The challenge of separating geopolitics and geoeconomics into separate spheres is due to their interdependence: interactions among nation-states as indivisible sovereign units exercising political power, and the predominance of neoclassical economics "logic of commerce" that ostensibly separates market dynamics from political power.

The following descriptions of geoeconomics indicate the challenge of distinguishing it from the field of geopolitics:

- Chatham House: "the use of economic tools to advance geopolitical objectives."
- Pippa Malmgren for the CFA Institute Research Foundation: "One can try to refine the definition of geopolitics by exploring the terms geo-economics, geostrategic, and other such derivations, but in the end, geopolitics exists in reality even if it is not well dealt with by theory."
- Merriam-Webster's Dictionary: "1. the combination of economic and geographic factors relating to international trade and 2. a governmental policy guided by geoeconomics"
- Richard Nixon: "Still others contend that, as the cold war weaned, the importance of economic power and 'geo-economics' has surpassed military power and traditional geopolitics. America, they conclude, must beat its swords not into plowshares, but into microchips."
- Robert D. Blackwill and Jennifer Harris in War By Other Means: Geoeconomics and Statecraft: "The use of economic instruments to promote and defend national interests, and to produce beneficial geopolitical results; and the effects of other nations' economic actions on a country's geopolitical goals."

Moreover, the levels of analysis in geoeconomics (policy, integration, and transaction) are similarly entangled with national policy, which can range from tax incentives for particular industries to anti-money laundering laws or sanctions that constrain particular cross-border financial transactions.

== Mercantilism ==
Geo-economics is not to be confused with mercantilism or neomercantilism. Under mercantilism, the goal of which was to maximize national gold stocks, when commercial quarrels evolved into political quarrels, which could then lead to military conflicts. Therefore, mercantilist competition was subordinate to military competition, as the former modality was governed by the ever-present possibility that the 'loser' in a commercial quarrel could then challenge the outcome militarily. For example:

"Spain might decree that all trade to and from its American colonies could only travel in Spanish bottoms through Spanish ports, but British and Dutch armed merchantmen could still convey profitable cargoes to disloyal colonists in defiance of Spanish sloops; and, with war declared, privateers could seize outright the even more profitable cargoes bound for Spain. Likewise, the Dutch sent their frigates into the Thames to reply to the mercantilist legislation of the British Parliament that prohibited their cabotage, just as much earlier the Portuguese had sunk Arab ships with which they could not compete in the India trade."

In the new era of geo-economics, however, there is no superior modality: Both the causes and the instruments of conflict can be economic. When commercial disagreements do lead to international political clashes, the disputes must be resolved with the weapons of commerce.

== The "weapons" of geoeconomics ==
States engage in geo-economic competition both through assisting or directing domestic private entities, or through direct action opposing foreign commercial interests:

- States assist private entities through supporting high-risk research and development, initiating overseas market-penetrating investments, and through production over-investment for market-share forcing.
- More directly, states impose taxes and quotas on foreign products, bolster regulatory or covert impediments to imports, engage in discounted export financing, initiate national technology programs, and collect economic and technical intelligence.

According to Luttwak, offensive weapons are more important in geo-economics, as they are in war. Moreover, state-sponsored research and development is the most important of these weapons.

"Just as in war the artillery conquers territory by fire, which the infantry can then occupy, the aim here is to conquer industries of the future by achieving technological superiority."

The "infantry" in this analogy corresponds to commercial production, which can also be supported by the state through various forms of subsidies. Yet another geo-economic weapon is predatory finance. If operation subsidies are insufficient to allow domestic exporters to overcome strong competitors, states can offer loans at below-market interest rates. The United States' Export-Import, for example, provides loan guarantees to finance exports, and equivalent institutions exist across all major industrial countries.

"Thus foreigners routinely pay lower interest rates than local borrowers, whose taxes pay for the very concessions that foreigners receive. That already amounts to hunting for exports with low-interest ammunition, but the accusation of predatory finance is reserved for cases where interest rates are suddenly reduced in the course of a fought-over sale. Naturally, the chief trading states have promised to each other that they will do no such thing. Naturally, they frequently break that promise."

== "Weaponized interdependence" ==
"Weaponized interdependence" is a term defined by Henry Farrell and Abraham L. Newman. Farrell and Newman do not address geoeconomics directly, however, their article addresses core factors for how power is exercised in the framework of geoeconomics:

"Specifically, we show how the topography of the economic networks of interdependence intersects with domestic institutions and norms to shape coercive authority. Our account places networks such as financial communications, supply chains, and the internet, which have been largely neglected by international relations scholars, at the heart of a compelling new understanding of globalization and power."

The framework used by Farrell and Newman is based on network theory, and frames the structure of power as a network of asymmetric interrelationships that enable central actors to "weaponized the structural advantages for coercive ends." States which obtain a sufficient structural advantage will be able to exercise either or both a "panopticon effect" and a "chokepoint effect". The panopticon effect is based upon Jeremy Bentham's Panopticon, which enables a few central actors to observe the activities of others due to the information access afforded by the network structure. The chokepoint effect is the ability of states with an advantageous position to limit or penalize the use of key information nodes (sometimes referred as "hubs") by others.

== See also ==
- Economic geography
- International political economy
- Industrial organization
- Geopolitical ontology
- Financial economics
- Geostrategy
- International relations
