= Crooked Timber =

Political blog

Crooked Timber is a blog leaning left-of-center politically primarily administered by academics. The blog's name is inspired by a quotation from philosopher Immanuel Kant: "Out of the crooked timber of humanity, no straight thing was ever made," from his 1784 essay "Idea for a Universal History with a Cosmopolitan Purpose". It includes contributions from a variety of experts in fields such as philosophy, political science, and sociology.

== History ==
Crooked Timber was founded in July 2003 as a merger of several individual blogs, including Junius and Gallowglass, along with some new contributors. Additional members were added over subsequent months until the group reached 16 to 17 members.

Crooked Timber ranked in Technorati's Top 100 blogs between 2003 and 2005 and is still widely linked to in the academic blogosphere. On March 9, 2008, it was listed as number 33 in The Guardian's list of the world's 50 most important blogs. On April 15, 2011, an article on academic blogs in The New York Times listed Crooked Timber as one of seven influential examples of the type, describing it as having "built a reputation as an intellectual global powerhouse; a sort of global philosophical thinktank conducted via blog.".

Crooked Timber has held several online book events, during which a subset of members (and often also invited guest bloggers) read a book and each write a blog post about it, either a review or a post inspired by the book.

== Current contributors ==
Name	Occupation
Chris Armstrong	Political theorist
Chris Bertram	Political philosopher at the University of Bristol, UK
Harry Brighouse	Political philosopher at the University of Wisconsin, Madison
Speranta Dumitru	Associate professor in Political Science at Paris Cité University
Henry Farrell	Political scientist at Johns Hopkins University SAIS
Maria Farrell	Director of Information Coordination, ICANN
Eszter Hargittai	Sociologist at Northwestern University
John Holbo	Philosopher at the National University of Singapore
Serene Khader	Philosopher and feminist theorist at Brooklyn College
Macarena Marey	Political Philosopher at University of Buenos Aires and the National University of Lanús
Kevin Munger	Assistant professor of political science at Penn State University
John Quiggin	Economist at the University of Queensland, Australia
Ingrid Robeyns	Political Philosopher at Erasmus University Rotterdam
Miriam Ronzoni	Political philosopher at the University of Manchester
Eric Schliesser	Philosopher
Gina Schouten	Philosopher at Harvard University
Paul Segal	Professor of Economics at IAE Business School, Universidad Austral
Belle Waring	Trained as a classicist at Berkeley; living in Singapore

== Former contributors ==
Name	Occupation
Tedra Osell	Freelance editor, California
Jon Mandle	Political philosopher at SUNY Albany
Niamh Hardiman	Senior Lecturer at University College Dublin
Michael Bérubé	Professor of American literature and cultural studies at Pennsylvania State University
Ted Barlow	Economic consultant in Houston, TX
Tom Runnacles	Software developer in London, previously studied philosophy at Oxford University
Micah Schwartzman	Professor at the University of Virginia School of Law
Daniel Davies	Financial industry analyst; former stockbroker and economist
Kieran Healy	Sociologist at Duke University
Scott McLemee	Writer, Inside Higher Education
Eric Rauchway	Professor of History at UC Davis
Corey Robin	Political theorist at Brooklyn College
Astra Taylor	Documentary film maker and fellow of the Shuttleworth Foundation
Brian Weatherson	A philosopher at The University of Michigan
Richard Yeselson	Contributing editor at Dissent (American magazine)
