= VLW =

VLW may refer to:

- Virtual legacy wires
- Visible Language Workshop
- Virginia Law Weekly
- Virginia Lawyers Weekly
- Voice of Libyan Women
