= Amit Mehta =

American federal judge (born 1971)

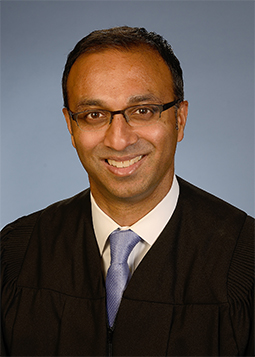
- Official portrait, 2016

Judge of the United States Foreign Intelligence Surveillance Court
- Incumbent
- Assumed office June 1, 2021
- Appointed by: John Roberts
- Preceded by: James Boasberg

Judge of the United States District Court for the District of Columbia
- Incumbent
- Assumed office December 19, 2014
- Appointed by: Barack Obama
- Preceded by: Ellen Segal Huvelle

Personal details
- Born: Amit Priyavadan Mehta; 1971 (age 54–55) Patan, Gujarat, India
- Education: Georgetown University (BA); University of Virginia (JD)

Amit Priyavadan Mehta (born 1971) is an American lawyer and jurist who serves as a United States district judge of the U.S. District Court for the District of Columbia. He was appointed in 2014 by President Barack Obama. In 2021, Mehta became a judge on the United States Foreign Intelligence Surveillance Court.

Mehta presided over cases related to attack on the United States Capitol on January 6, 2021, and the Google antitrust case. In 2022, he rejected efforts by Donald Trump to dismiss lawsuits accusing the former President of legal responsibility in the attacks.

== Early life and education ==
Mehta was born in 1971 in Patan, Gujarat, India. At the age of one, Mehta emigrated with his parents, Priyavadan and Ragini Mehta, to the United States. His mother worked as a laboratory technician, while his father worked as an engineer. Mehta was raised in Reisterstown, Maryland, a suburb of Baltimore. He graduated from Franklin High School in 1989.

Mehta graduated from Georgetown University in 1993 with a Bachelor of Arts degree in economics, graduating Phi Beta Kappa. From 1993 to 1994, Mehta worked as a paralegal at the law firm Patton Boggs (now Squire Patton Boggs). He then attended the University of Virginia School of Law, where he was an editor of the Virginia Journal of Social Policy & the Law. He graduated in 1997 with a Juris Doctor and Order of the Coif honors.

== Early career ==
After graduating from law school, Mehta spent a year as an associate at the law firm Latham & Watkins before leaving to be a law clerk to Judge Susan P. Graber of the United States Court of Appeals for the Ninth Circuit from 1998 to 1999. He was an associate at the law firm Zuckerman Spaeder, LLP from 1999 to 2002, then became a staff attorney at the Public Defender Service for the District of Columbia from 2002 to 2007.

From 2007 to 2014, he rejoined Zuckerman Spaeder, serving as partner from 2010 to 2014. He represented clients in civil and criminal matters before state and federal courts. While in the private sector, he represented former Managing Director of the International Monetary Fund Dominique Strauss-Kahn.

== Federal judicial service ==
=== Nomination ===
On July 31, 2014, President Barack Obama nominated Mehta to serve as a United States District Judge of the United States District Court for the District of Columbia, to the seat vacated by Judge Ellen Segal Huvelle, who took senior status on June 3, 2014. He received a hearing before the United States Senate Committee on the Judiciary on September 17, 2014. On November 20, 2014, his nomination was reported out of committee by voice vote. On December 13, 2014, Senate Majority Leader Harry Reid filed a motion to invoke cloture on the nomination.

On December 16, 2014, Reid withdrew his cloture motion on Mehta's nomination, and the Senate proceeded to vote to confirm Mehta in a voice vote. He received his federal judicial commission on December 19, 2014.

=== Tenure ===
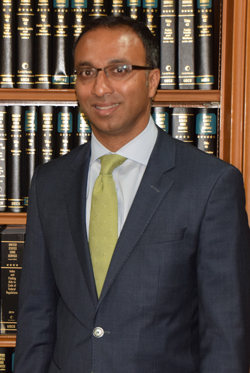
Judge Mehta in 2015

In May 2019, Mehta ruled that accounting firm Mazars had to provide its records of Donald Trump's accounts from before his presidency to the House Oversight Committee in response to their subpoena. In a 41-page opinion, he asserted that Congress has the right to investigate potential illegal behavior by a president, including actions both before and after the president assumed office. The ruling will be appealed by Trump's personal legal team.

In July 2019, Mehta sided with the pharmaceutical firms Merck & Co., Eli Lilly and Company, and Amgen Inc. by blocking a Trump administration rule requiring drugmakers to put prices in television ads, a central part of the president's push to lower the cost of prescription medications. The goal of the rule was to increase transparency; Mehta ruled that requiring big pharmaceutical companies to disclose prices to consumers in television advertisements was something that could be done only by the Department of Health and Human Services if mandated by Congress.

In 2020, Mehta became the presiding judge in the United States v. Google LLC antitrust case. On June 1, 2021, Chief Justice John Roberts appointed Mehta to the United States Foreign Intelligence Surveillance Court.

==== January 6 Capitol attack-related cases ====
Mehta has presided over several cases related to the January 6 United States Capitol attack. He has charge of the criminal prosecution of Oath Keepers founder Stewart Rhodes for seditious conspiracy. He is also presiding over three civil lawsuits against Trump and multiple associates, in which several members of Congress and two police officers are suing for damages for physical and emotional injuries they allegedly incurred during the attacks.

On February 18, 2022, Mehta issued a lengthy opinion that rejected Trump's claim of "absolute immunity" from lawsuits, finding that his actions were not part of his presidential duties, and that there was plausible evidence to suggest he engaged in a conspiracy with organized groups to use any means, including violence, to overturn the results of the 2020 election. The opinion allows the case to proceed, with the plaintiffs demanding documents, depositions, and other evidence from Trump and members of the Oath Keepers and Proud Boys. Mehta dropped several other co-defendants from the suit, including Rudy Giuliani, Donald Trump Jr., and Representative Mo Brooks.

On January 25, 2024, Mehta sentenced former Trump adviser, Peter Navarro, to four months in jail for contempt of Congress after defying a subpoena related to the congressional investigation into the January 6, 2021, US Capitol attack.

=== Google antitrust case ===
On August 5, 2024, Mehta ruled that Google is a monopoly and has violated antitrust laws. In September 2025, he ruled that Google would not be required to divest of Chrome or Android, but would be barred from including Search in exclusive contracts and required to share certain search index and user interaction data with competitors.

== Personal life ==
Mehta is an avid fan of hip hop music. In a 2015 copyright case regarding the similarity of two songs, Mehta noted in a footnote that he was "not a 'lay person' when it comes to hip-hop music and lyrics," and noted he has "listened to hip hop for decades". American rappers Jay-Z, Eminem, Kanye West and Canadian rapper Drake are among his favorite artists.

== See also ==
- List of Asian American jurists

Legal offices
Preceded by Ellen Segal Huvelle	Judge of the United States District Court for the District of Columbia; 2014–present	Incumbent
Preceded by James Boasberg	Judge of the United States Foreign Intelligence Surveillance Court; 2021–present	Incumbent
