= IUH =

IUH may refer to:

- Idea for a Universal History with a Cosmopolitan Purpose, 1784 text by Immanuel Kant
- Inverted-U hypothesis of Somatic anxiety
- Industrial University of Ho Chi Minh City
- Interdimensional UFO hypothesis
