= Virginia Law & Business Review =

- Discipline: Business law
- Language: English
- Edited by: Leanne O'Donnell (2020)

Publication details
- History: 2006–present
- Publisher: Virginia Law & Business Review Association (United States)
- Frequency: Triannual (Winter, Spring, and Fall)

Standard abbreviations
- Bluebook: Va. L. & Bus. Rev.
- ISO 4: Va. Law Bus. Rev.

Indexing
- ISSN: 1930-627X

Links
- Journal homepage

The Virginia Law & Business Review is a journal of business law scholarship that is published three times per year by students of the University of Virginia School of Law. The student-editors are members of the Virginia Law & Business Review Association, a not-for-profit corporation chartered in the Commonwealth of Virginia.

== Content ==
The Virginia Law & Business Review publishes articles, essays, comments, and book reviews from business law professors, practitioners, judges, and law clerks on business law subjects. In addition, the journal publishes student notes from University of Virginia students. Articles address antitrust, bankruptcy, commercial law, corporations, corporate governance, employment law, mergers & acquisitions, securities regulation, secured transactions, takeover litigation, venture capital, and other corporate law subjects.

Prominent authors who have published in the journal include William W. Bratton (Georgetown University Law Center), Howell E. Jackson (Harvard Law School), Jonathan R. Macey (Yale Law School), Larry E. Ribstein (University of Illinois College of Law), Lynn A. Stout (UCLA School of Law), Myron T. Steele (Chief Justice, Delaware Supreme Court), E. Norman Veasey (former Chief Justice, Delaware Supreme Court), John W. Warner (former U.S. Senator), and Mark R. Warner (U.S. Senator).

== Circulation ==
The Virginia Law & Business Review consistently ranks among the premier journals of business law scholarship, and its current hard-copy circulation exceeds 1,000 copies per issue. In addition, the journal is accessible on its website and on electronic databases such as LexisNexis and Westlaw.

== Symposia ==
Each spring, the Virginia Law & Business Review sponsors an academic symposium held at the University of Virginia School of Law. Topics of recent symposia include the impact of institutional investors on capital markets, U.S. competitiveness in the world economy, and the global credit crisis of 2009.

Notable speakers have included William W. Bratton (Georgetown University Law Center), Robert F. Bruner (University of Virginia Darden School of Business), Donald C. Langevoort (Georgetown University Law Center), Paul Mahoney (University of Virginia School of Law), and Randall S. Thomas (Vanderbilt University Law School).

A past symposium, "The Business of Health Care," featured a keynote speech by Earl "Duke" Collier, Jr., a 1973 graduate of the University of Virginia School of Law. Collier is a former Deputy Administrator of the Health Care Finance Administration (now the Centers for Medicare & Medicaid Services) and current health care executive.

== Membership ==
The Virginia Law & Business Review selects its members based on the results of a legal writing competition held each spring and fall at the University of Virginia School of Law. The competition consists of editing and writing exercises to test each applicant's knowledge of English grammar and legal citation rules and conventions. There is no fixed number of new members accepted each year; recent classes have ranged from about 30 to 40 new student-editors per year.

== Founding ==
The Virginia Law & Business Review was founded by John B. Esterhay of University of Virginia Law School Class of 2006 and the student-editors of the journal's inaugural managing board. The journal was formed in 2005. It was approved by the faculty of the University of Virginia School of Law in 2005. Its first issue was published in 2006.
