= Charles M. Elson =

- Born: November 12, 1959 (age 66); Atlanta, Georgia, U.S.
- Education: Harvard University; University of Virginia
- Occupations: Corporate Director; Attorney; Professor, University of Delaware

Charles Myer Elson (born November 12, 1959) is the Edgar S. Woolard Jr. Chair in Corporate Governance at the University of Delaware. He currently serves on the Board of Directors for Encompass Health. He has served on the Board of Directors for Circon Corporation, Sunbeam Corporation, Nuevo Energy, AutoZone, Alderwoods Group, and Bob Evans Farms.

Considered an expert in the field of corporate governance, Elson has been published in many of the leading academic and professional journals.

== Early life ==
Elson was born in Atlanta, Georgia in 1959. He is the son of Edward Elliot Elson and Susie Elson. His father, an entrepreneur, was the U.S. Ambassador to Denmark from 1994 to 1998 as an appointee of President Bill Clinton.

Elson graduated from Philips Academy in 1977. He received his bachelor's degree from Harvard College in 1981, and completed his J.D. degree at the University of Virginia School of Law in 1985. Following law school, Elson served as a law clerk for Judge J. Harvie Wilkinson III of the United States Court of Appeals for the Fourth Circuit and Judge Elbert P. Tuttle of the United States Court of Appeals for the Eleventh Circuit.

== Legal and teaching career ==
From 1986 to 1990, Elson served as an associate in the Corporate Finance and M&A practice with Sullivan & Cromwell LLP. Following this, he joined the Stetson University College of Law faculty, where he taught until 2001. In 2000, Elson was named the inaugural Edgar S. Woolard Jr. Chair in Corporate Governance and Director of the John L. Weinberg Center for Corporate Governance at the University of Delaware.

From 1995 until May 2024, Elson worked as a consultant to Holland & Knight. Elson resigned from Holland and Knight after Elon Musk threatened to fire the firm from unrelated work if it allowed Elson to file an amicus curiae brief in a case relating to Musk's pay at Tesla.

== Honors and awards ==
In 2006, Elson was named one of the "100 most influential people in finance" by Treasury & Risk Management

In 2013, Elson was named one of the "100 most influential people in corporate governance" by NACD Directorship Magazine.

From 2011 to 2015, Ethisphere named Elson one of the "100 most influential people in Business Ethics".

Additionally, Global Proxy Watch has named him one of their 10 Governance "stars".
