= Jon Mandle =

American philosopher

Jonathan Mandle is a Professor of Philosophy and former Philosophy Department Chair at the University at Albany, The State University of New York. He is a member of the Crooked Timber group blog. He is the brother of NBA player Adonal Foyle.

He served as University at Albany Philosophy department chair from 2004-2013.

== Education ==
- B.A., University of Pennsylvania, Philosophy
- Ph.D., University of Pittsburgh, Philosophy, under the direction of Kurt Baier

== Interests ==
- Ethics and political theory and their history
- John Rawls' theory of social justice

== Publications ==
- What's Left of Liberalism? An Interpretation and Defense of Justice as Fairness. Lexington Books, 2000. (ISBN 0-7391-0104-8)
- Global Justice: An Introduction. Blackwell Publishers, 2006. (ISBN 0-7456-3065-0)

== Notable blog posts ==
- Lifeboat Ethics (critique of Garrett Hardin)
- All posts (Crooked Timber post list for Jon Mandle)
