= Virginia Journal of Law and Technology =

- Discipline: Technology law, intellectual property law
- Language: English
- Edited by: Lauren Grohowski (Editor-in-Chief)

Publication details
- History: 1996-present
- Publisher: The Virginia Journal of Law and Technology Association (United States)
- Frequency: Quarterly
- Open access: Yes

Standard abbreviations
- Bluebook: Va. J.L. & Tech.
- ISO 4: Va. J. Law Technol.

Indexing
- ISSN: 2327-7777 (print); 1522-1687 (web)
- LCCN: 2013200802
- OCLC no.: 56209151

Links
- Journal homepage

The Virginia Journal of Law and Technology (VJOLT) is a quarterly law review edited and published by students at the University of Virginia School of Law. It is indexed by Westlaw, LexisNexis and Bloomberg Law. The journal was ranked 18th among 59 Science, Technology, and Computing law journals in the Washington and Lee University School of Law's 2016 journal ranking list. VJOLT was established in 1996 and covers topics including intellectual property, biotechnology, digital privacy, antitrust and telecommunications law. In addition, the journal co-sponsors an annual symposium on an emerging area of technology and law each spring.

In 2017, the Journal launched a new website and a Twitter account. Later that same year, the Journal published its first-ever podcast, an interview with Basit Mustafa, CEO of Voltaire (a company which makes jury selection assistance software).
