= Eszter Hargittai =

Hungarian and American sociologist

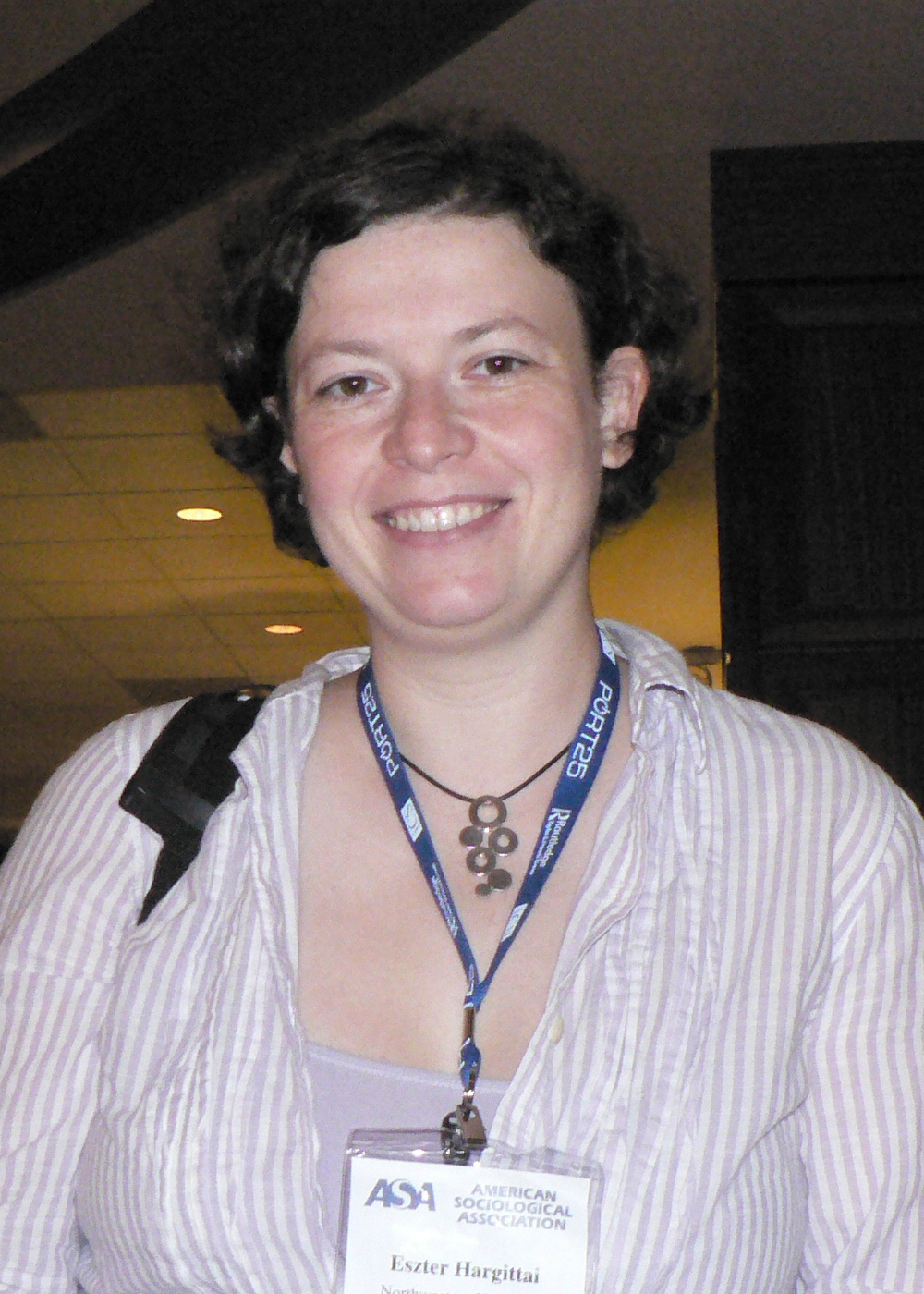
- Hargittai in 2008
- Born: December 15, 1973 (age 52); Budapest, Hungary
- Citizenship: Hungary, United States
- Education: Smith College (BA); Princeton University (PhD)
- Known for: Sociology of the Internet; Digital Divide
- Awards: G. R. Miller Dissertation Award, National Communication Association, Young Scholar Award, International Communication Association
- Scientific career
- Fields: Sociology; Communication
- Workplaces: Northwestern University; University of Zurich
- Doctoral advisor: Paul DiMaggio, chair; Paul Starr; Miguel Centeno
- Website: www.eszter.com

Eszter Hargittai (born December 15, 1973 in Budapest, Hungary) is a communication studies scholar and Professor at the University of Zurich.

== Biography ==
She holds a BA in Sociology from Smith College and a PhD in Sociology from Princeton University where she was a Wilson Scholar.

Before moving to Zurich, she was Delaney Family Professor of Communication Studies and Faculty Associate of the Institute for Policy Research (IPR) at Northwestern University where she is still affiliated as Adjunct Professor and Fellow at IPR.

She was a fellow at the Center for Advanced Study in the Behavioral Sciences at Stanford (2006–2007), a fellow at the Institute for International Integration Studies, Trinity College Dublin (2007), and a fellow at Harvard's Berkman Klein Center for Internet & Society (2008–09) where she was on the Faculty Advisory Board until 2020. She has been a member of the group blog Crooked Timber since 2003.

Her research focuses on the social and policy implications of information technologies with a particular interest in how IT may contribute to or alleviate social inequalities. She has studied the differences in people's Web-use skills, the evolution of search engines and the organization and presentation of online content, political uses of information technologies, how IT are influencing the types of cultural products people consume, and geocaching.

In 2025 Hargittai co-published together with John Palfrey the book Wired Wisdom : How to age better online

Her work is regularly featured in the media. She was interviewed about the Internet and its social implications on CNNfn's The Flip Side on 29 April 2004. Her work on the international spread of the Internet was referenced by Wired News and cited in a United States Senate hearing. Other coverage includes BBC News as well as the Chicago Tribune The Washington Post, The Wall Street Journal and several other publications.

== Notable publications ==
- ————, ed. (2009). Research Confidential: Solutions to Problems Most Social Scientists Pretend They Never Have. Ann Arbor: University of Michigan Press. doi:10.3998/mpub.268873. ISBN 978-0-472-07026-8. Archived from the original on 2012-09-14.

== Sources ==
- List of publications that have printed Eszter Hargittai
