= Jonathan Cannon (lawyer) =

American environmental lawyer

Jonathan Z. Cannon
- Occupations: Environmental lawyer, academic and author

Academic background
- Education: Williams College (BA); University of Pennsylvania Law School (JD)

Jonathan Z. Cannon is an American environmental lawyer, academic and author. He is a Blaine T Phillips Distinguished Professor of Environmental Law Emeritus at the University of Virginia School of Law.

Cannon’s expertise lies in environmental and land use regulation, design and implementation of regional and national programs, Supreme Court environmental decisions, and global sustainability issues. He has authored two books entitled Reclaiming the Land: Rethinking Superfund Institutions, Methods and Practices (with Greg Macey), and Environment in the Balance: The Green Movement and the Supreme Court.

Cannon is a Fellow of the National Academy of Public Administration, and the American College of Environmental Lawyers. He is also a member of the Board of Directors of Environmental Law Institute, and of the Advisory Committee of the Institute for Policy Integrity at New York University School of Law. He served on the EPA Transition Team for the first Obama Administration.

== Education ==
Cannon graduated summa cum laude with a B.A. degree from Williams College in 1967. He earned his J.D. Degree from the University of Pennsylvania Law School in 1974.

== Career ==
Following his J.D. Degree, Cannon held appointment as a law clerk for Chief Judge David L. Bazelon on the U.S. Court of Appeals for the D.C. Circuit. In 1975, he joined Beveridge & Diamond, P.C., and was a partner there from 1980 until 1986. He served in the U.S. Environmental Protection Agency’s (EPA) Office of General Counsel as Deputy General Counsel of Litigation and Regional Operations from 1986 until 1987, and in the Office of Enforcement and Compliance Monitoring, EPA, as Deputy Assistant Administrator from 1988 until 1989. He was a Partner again at Beveridge & Diamond, P.C. from 1990 to 1992. Returning to the U.S. EPA, he held appointments as Director of the Gulf of Mexico Program in 1992, as Assistant Administrator of Administration and Resources Management in 1993, and as General Counsel in 1995. As General Counsel, Cannon authored what has become known since as the "Cannon memo," opining that EPA has the authority to regulate greenhouse gas emissions under the existing Clean Air Act. The Supreme Court endorsed that position in Massachusetts v. EPA, which Richard Lazarus has written is "the most important environmental law case ever decided by the Court.”

Apart from agency appointments, Cannon also held academic appointments in his career. He joined the University of Virginia School of Law in 1998 as John A. Ewald, Jr. Visiting Professor, and became Professor of Law in 1999. In 2008, the law school appointed him Blaine T. Phillips Distinguished Professor of Environmental Law.

== Works ==
In his environmental law career, Cannon has focused his work on design and implementation of regional and national programs, and global sustainability issues. His work in the field has received wide recognition in various social media platforms. The New York Times has quoted Cannon’s views regarding the authority of EPA to regulate emissions of greenhouse gases. While discussing a case brought by Virginia Attorney General Ken Cuccinelli case against the EPA, disputing the scientific basis for the agency’s assessment of climate change risks, The Washington Post highlighted Cannon’s view that "there seems to be a symbolic element to some of the litigation that he’s selected."

Cannon authored a book in 2015, focusing on U.S. Supreme Court decisions over four decades. Jedediah S. Britton-Purdy praised the book while stating that "Cannon’s integration of legal and cultural analysis has great promise for the Anthropocene." Anthony N. Penna noted the book’s theme that "the majority of the Supreme Court’s decisions regarding environmental legislation reflected a struggle between competing and conflicting [cultural] beliefs and values." On the occasion of Cannon’s retirement, Tom Richichi shared his view that "If there ever has been an Environmental Renaissance Man, then surely it must be Jon Cannon”

Cannon’s work included exploration of strategies for reducing carbon emissions, including the implications of continued use of carbon‐based fuels for national security, the environment and the economy (with Michael Bucey). He served on the National Academy of Science’s Committee on America’s Energy Future, which issued a series of consensus reports on the risks posed by global climate change and strategies for managing them.

== Bibliography ==
=== Books ===
- Reclaiming the Land: Rethinking Superfund Institutions, Methods and Practices co-authored with Greg Macey (2007) ISBN 9780387488578
- Environment in the Balance: The Green Movement and the Supreme Court (2015) ISBN 9780674425989

=== Selected articles ===
- Cannon, J. (2006). Checking in on the Chesapeake: Some Questions of Design. U. Rich. L. Rev.
- Cannon, J. Z. (2006). Environmentalism and the Supreme Court: A Cultural Analysis. Ecology Law Quarterly.
- Cannon, J. (2007). Words And Worlds: The Supreme Court In Rapanos and Carabell. Virginia Environmental Law Journal.
- Cannon, J. (2010). The Sounds of Silence: Cost-Benefit Canons In Entergy Corp. V. Riverkeeper, Inc. The Harvard Environmental Law Review.
- Cannon, J. (2011). Taking Enforcement on Its Own Terms: EPA's Heavy‐Duty Diesel Engine Litigation. 5(2).
- Cannon, J. (2016). Have We Glimpsed the Environmentalist Future at Paris?—Toward a Theory of Change, Harvard Law Review Forum. If the first is included, the heading for this section should be changed to “Selected Articles and Book Chapters.”
- Cannon, J. (2020). Judicial Review in the New Age of Deference. Combating Climate Change With Section 115 of the Clean Air Act: Law and Policy Rationales (Michael Burger ed.)
