= Risa L. Goluboff =

American lawyer

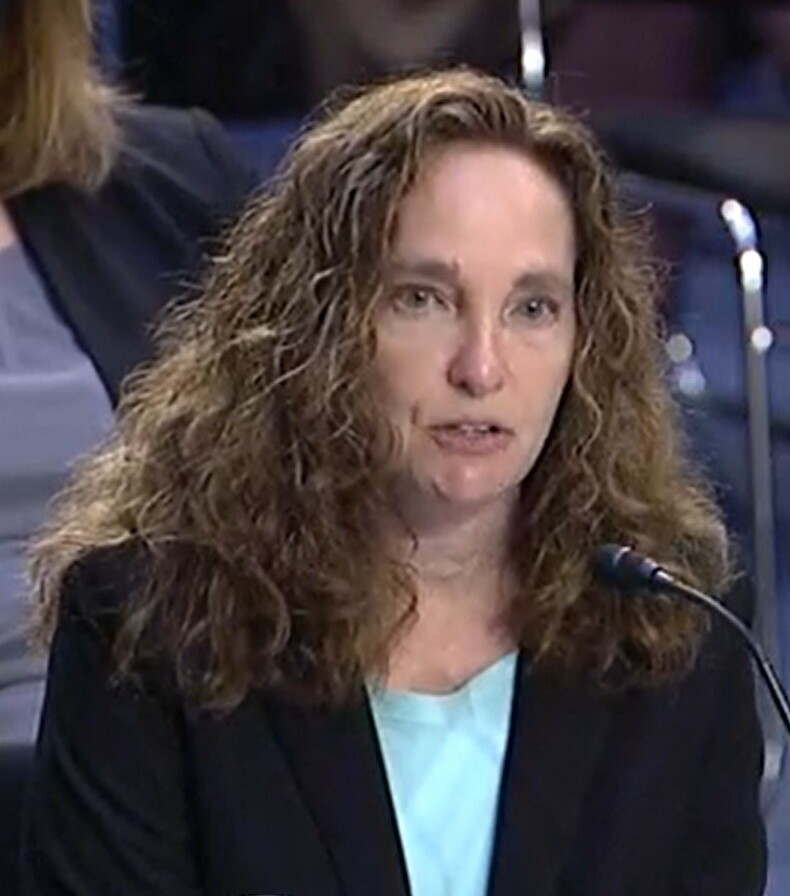
- Goluboff in 2022

12th Dean of the University of Virginia School of Law
- In office July 1, 2016 – June 30, 2024
- Preceded by: Paul Mahoney
- Succeeded by: Leslie Kendrick

Personal details
- Education: Harvard University (BA); Princeton University (MA, PhD); Yale University (JD)

Risa Lauren Goluboff is an American legal scholar who served as the 12th dean of the University of Virginia School of Law from 2016 to 2024, the first woman to hold the position. She is also the Arnold H. Leon Professor of Law and a professor of history at the University of Virginia.

== Education ==
Goluboff studied history and sociology as an undergraduate at Harvard University, where she earned a B.A. in 1994. In 1999, she received an M.A. from Princeton University before attending Yale Law School, where she graduated in 2000. She also received a Ph.D. in history from Princeton University in 2003.

== Career ==
From 2000 to 2001, she clerked for Judge Guido Calabresi of the United States Court of Appeals for the Second Circuit. From 2001 to 2002, she was clerk for Justice Stephen Breyer of the Supreme Court of the United States. She served as a Fulbright Scholar to South Africa.

In 2009, she won a Guggenheim fellowship.

On November 20, 2015, she was selected to be the dean of the University of Virginia School of Law, becoming the first woman to hold the position, and took office July 1, 2016. She retired from the position on June 30, 2024, and was succeeded by Leslie Kendrick.

== Works ==
- Goluboff, Risa L. (2016). Vagrant Nation: Police Power, Constitutional Change, and the Making of the 1960s. Oxford University Press. ISBN 9780199768448.
- Goluboff, Risa L. (2007). The lost promise of civil rights. Harvard University Press. ISBN 9780674024656. Preview.

Editor

- Goluboff, Risa L.; Gilles, Myriam E., eds. (2008). Civil Rights Stories. Foundation Press. ISBN 9781599410814.

Journal articles

- Goluboff, Risa L. (April 2001). "The Thirteenth Amendment and the Lost Origins of Civil Rights". Duke Law Journal. 50 (6): 1609–1685. doi:10.2307/1373044. JSTOR 1373044. Pdf.
- Goluboff, Risa L. (June 2003). "'We Live in a Free House Such As It Is:' Class and the Creation of Modern Civil Rights". University of Pennsylvania Law Review. 151 (6): 1977–2018. doi:10.2307/3313023. JSTOR 3313023. S2CID 145165357. Archived from the original on October 8, 2014.
- Goluboff, Risa L. (June 2005). "'Let Economic Equality Take Care of Itself:' The NAACP, Labor Litigation, and the Making of the Civil Rights in the 1940s". UCLA Law Review. 52: 1393.

PhD Thesis

- Goluboff, Risa L. (2003). The work of civil rights in the 1940s: the Department of Justice, the NAACP, and African American agricultural labor. Princeton University Library.

== See also ==
- List of law clerks for the second seat of the Supreme Court of the United States
