= Andrew Leipold =

American lawyer and professor

Andrew D. Leipold is an academic and legal scholar who specializes in criminal law and criminal procedure. He is the Edwin M. Adams Professor of Law at University of Illinois and formerly served as the editor-in-chief of Virginia Law Review.

== Education ==
Andrew Leipold
- Education: Boston University (B.S.); University of Virginia School of Law (J.D.)
- Known for: Criminal law, criminal procedure, juries and jury behavior

Leipold earned his Bachelor of Science degree in public relations, summa cum laude, from Boston University. He received his Juris Doctor from the University of Virginia School of Law, where he was a member of the Order of the Coif and served as editor-in-chief of the Virginia Law Review.

== Career ==
After graduation, he clerked for Judge Abner J. Mikva of the United States Court of Appeals for the District of Columbia Circuit and for Justice Lewis F. Powell, Jr. of the United States Supreme Court.

Following his clerkships, Leipold practiced as a litigation associate with Morgan, Lewis & Bockius in Philadelphia. He joined the faculty of the University of Illinois College of Law in 1992, where he became the Edwin M. Adams Professor of Law. At Illinois, he served as Associate Dean for Academic Affairs from 2001 to 2003 and has directed the Program in Criminal Law and Procedure since 2005. He has been voted Outstanding Faculty Member 15 times and received the Campus Award for Excellence in Graduate and Professional Teaching in 2000. Leipold has also held visiting professorships at Boston College Law School and Duke University School of Law, where he received the Distinguished Teaching Award. In 2007, he was appointed by Chief Justice John G. Roberts to a three-year term on the Judicial Conference Advisory Committee on Criminal Rules.

Leipold’s scholarship focuses on criminal law and procedure, with particular attention to jury behavior, prosecutorial practices, and wrongful convictions. He is the author of Federal Practice and Procedure: Criminal (Volumes 1 and 1A) and has written extensively in leading law reviews. His articles include “The Impact of Joinder and Severance on Federal Criminal Cases: An Empirical Study” (Vanderbilt Law Review), “How the Pretrial Process Contributes to Wrongful Convictions” (American Criminal Law Review), “Why Are Federal Judges So Acquittal Prone?” (Washington University Law Quarterly), “The Problem of the Innocent, Acquitted Defendant” (Northwestern University Law Review), and “Constitutionalizing Jury Selection in Criminal Cases” (Georgetown Law Journal). His essay “The Limits of Deterrence Theory in the War on Drugs” appeared in The Journal of Gender, Race & Justice, and he contributed to the Heritage Foundation Guide to the Constitution and to Controversial Issues in Criminal Justice and Criminology. He has also served as a consultant to the Illinois Criminal Law Reform Commission, the Governor’s Truth in Sentencing Commission, and the Office of the Independent Counsel in the Whitewater investigation. In 2002, he delivered invited lectures on organized crime and American criminal procedure at the Ministry of Justice in Brasília, Brazil, and at the Federal University of Rio Grande do Sul in Porto Alegre.
