= Virginia Journal of International Law =

- Discipline: International Law
- Language: English

Publication details
- Former name: Journal of the John Bassett Moore Society of International Law (1960-1963)
- History: 1960-present
- Publisher: The Virginia Journal of International Law Association (United States)
- Frequency: Triannually

Standard abbreviations
- Bluebook: Va. J. Int'l L.
- ISO 4: Va. J. Int. Law

Indexing
- ISSN: 0042-6571

Links
- Journal homepage

The Virginia Journal of International Law is a law journal that was established in 1960 at the University of Virginia School of Law. As of 2023, it is the world's 4th most influential international law journal. Pieces published in the Journal have been cited by the Supreme Court of the United States, multiple U.S. Circuit Courts of Appeals, and the International Court of Justice.

== Scope ==
The scope of the journal covers issues such as international commercial and trade law, international litigation and arbitration, international organizations, international humanitarian and human rights law, and comparative law. It contains a mix of full-length articles, comments, essays, and book reviews, as well as notes, recent developments, and book notes.
