= John Calvin Jeffries =

American lawyer

John Calvin Jeffries Jr.
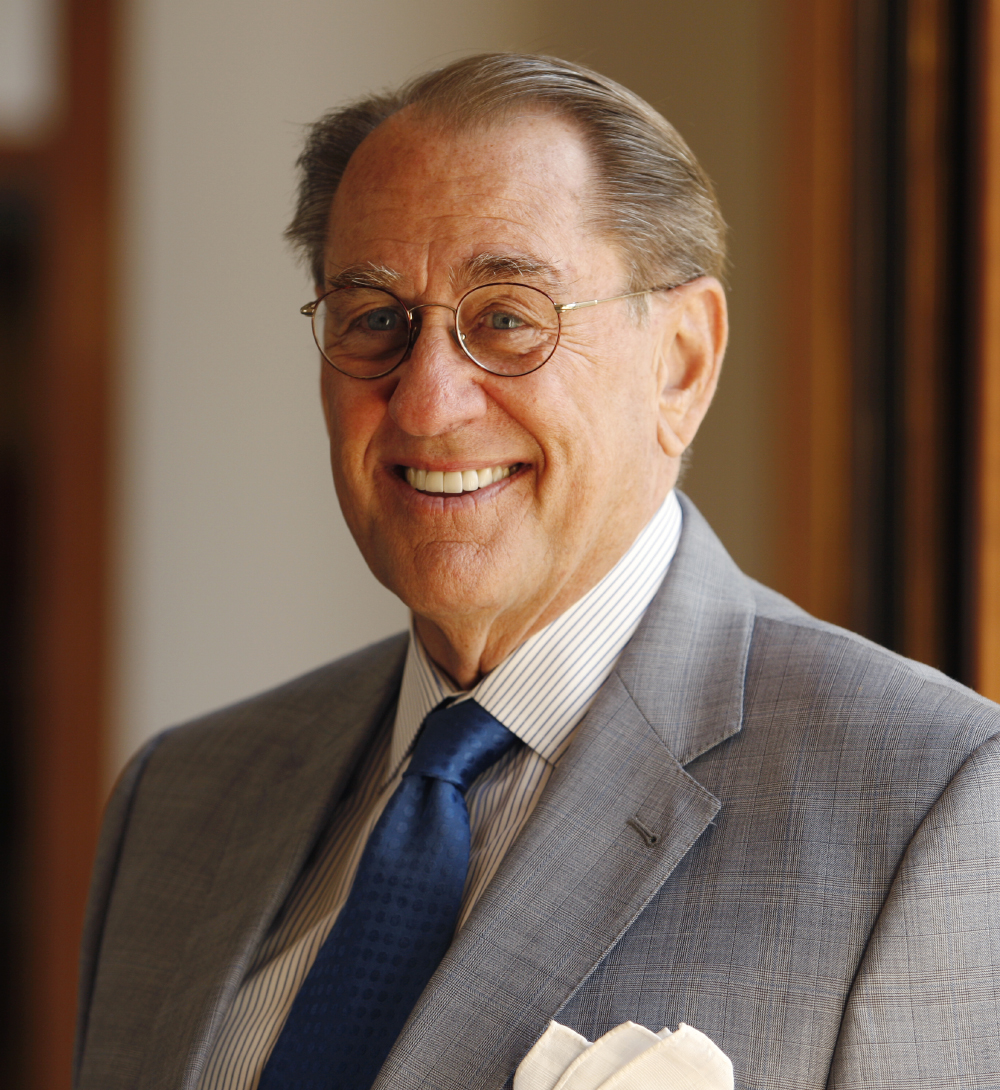

10th Dean of the University of Virginia School of Law
- In office July 1, 2001 – June 30, 2008
- Preceded by: Robert E. Scott
- Succeeded by: Paul G. Mahoney

Personal details
- Born: 1948 (age 77–78)
- Education: Yale University (BA); University of Virginia (JD)
- Known for: Constitutional law, criminal law, federal courts, civil rights litigation

John Calvin Jeffries Jr. (born ca. 1948) is an American law professor who was the dean of the University of Virginia School of Law from 2001 to 2008.

== Biography ==
Jeffries is the David and Mary Harrison Distinguished Professor of Law and Counselor to the President at the University of Virginia. He is best known for his work in criminal law, constitutional law, and constitutional torts. He is also a co-author of one of the foremost criminal law textbooks, Criminal Law with Professors Richard J. Bonnie, Anne M. Coughlin, and Peter W. Low. Jeffries has authored or co-authored a total of ten textbooks, primarily on civil rights and criminal law. Jeffries also wrote a biography of Justice Powell titled Justice Lewis F. Powell Jr. (New York: Charles Scribner's Sons, 1994). ISBN 0-8232-2110-5 and co-authored a book on the trial of John Hinckley.

Jeffries graduated summa cum laude from Yale University in 1970 and received his J.D. degree from the University of Virginia School of Law in 1973. During law school, Jeffries served as editor-in-chief of the Virginia Law Review. He received the Z Award for the highest academic average and the Woods Prize for the outstanding graduate. Immediately after graduation, he became a law clerk to U.S. Supreme Court Justice Lewis F. Powell, Jr. before serving briefly in the U.S. Army as a second lieutenant.

As dean at Virginia Law, Jeffries had significant achievements. He put the Law School on a new financial foundation by renouncing dwindling state funds and relying on increased tuition. To soften the impact of higher tuition, he initiated an extremely generous loan-forgiveness program for graduates engaged in public service. He also created the Law & Business Program, a curricular innovation designed to give law students the accounting and finance skills required to communicate effectively in the business world. Jeffries also oversaw the creation of the Center for the Study of Race and Law in 2003. In 2006 the law school received close to $10 million in donations (then a record for the school) and contributions from more than 50% of its living alumni, setting up a 14-year run with more than half of graduates giving.

In late summer of 2007, Jeffries announced he would step down in July 2008 as dean to return to teaching. In 2017 he received the Thomas Jefferson Award for excellence in scholarship, the highest honor given to members of the University community. From 2018-2021 he served as senior vice president for advancement at the University of Virginia. After stepping down from that position, he retained a part-time appointment as counselor to UVA President Jim Ryan while continuing to serve on the law School faculty. Currently, he is Co-Reporter (with Pamela S. Karlan of Stanford) of the American Law Institute’s forthcoming Restatement of the Law, Constitutional Torts and continues to teach Civil Rights and Federal Courts.

Jeffries is highly regarded for his teaching: Ryan has described Jeffries as "simply the best classroom teacher I've ever seen."

== See also ==
- List of law clerks for the first seat of the Supreme Court of the United States
