= Paul G. Mahoney =

American law professor (born 1959)

Paul Mahoney

President of the University of Virginia
- Acting
- In office August 11, 2025 – January 1, 2026
- Preceded by: J. J. Wagner Davis (acting)
- Succeeded by: Scott C. Beardsley

11th Dean of the University of Virginia School of Law
- In office July 1, 2008 – July 1, 2016
- Preceded by: John Calvin Jeffries
- Succeeded by: Risa L. Goluboff

Personal details
- Born: 1959 (age 66–67)
- Education: Massachusetts Institute of Technology (BS); Yale University (JD)

Academic work
- Discipline: Law
- Sub-discipline: Securities law Economic law Corporate law

Paul G. Mahoney (born 1959) is an American law professor and was the interim president of the University of Virginia from August 2025 to January 2026. He served as the 11th dean of the University of Virginia School of Law from July 2008 to July 2016.

== Education ==
Mahoney received a Bachelor of Science degree with a major in electrical engineering from the Massachusetts Institute of Technology in 1981 and a Juris Doctor degree from Yale Law School in 1984.

== Career ==
Mahoney clerked for Judge Ralph K. Winter Jr. of the United States Court of Appeals for the Second Circuit and for United States Supreme Court Justice Thurgood Marshall. He practiced law at Sullivan & Cromwell from 1986 until 1990, when he joined the Virginia law faculty. His areas of academic interest are securities regulation, law and economic development, corporate finance, financial derivatives and contracts.

Mahoney is a member of the Council on Foreign Relations, and was an associate editor of the Journal of Economic Perspectives and a director of the American Law and Economics Association.

On August 4, 2025, Mahoney was named as the interim president of the University of Virginia.

== See also ==
- List of law clerks for the tenth seat of the Supreme Court of the United States
