= Micah Schwartzman =

American lawyer (born 1976)

Micah J. Schwartzman
- Born: June 1976 (age 50)
- Occupations: Hardy Cross Dillard Professor of Law; F. D. G. Ribble Professor of Law; Director, Karsh Center for Law and Democracy

Academic background
- Education: University of Virginia (BA, JD); University of Oxford (DPhil)

Academic work
- Discipline: Law
- Sub-discipline: Constitutional law of the United States
- Institutions: University of Virginia School of Law

Micah Jacob Schwartzman (born June 1976) is an American legal scholar who serves as the Hardy Cross Dillard Professor of Law, the F.D.G. Dribble Professor of Law, and Director of the Karsh Center for Law and Democracy at the University of Virginia School of Law.

== Education ==
He studied government and foreign affairs at the University of Virginia where he earned a Harry S. Truman Scholarship. He then obtained his D.Phil in Politics from Balliol College, University of Oxford where he was a Rhodes Scholar. Schwartzman then went on to receive his J.D. from the University of Virginia School of Law where he was a Hardy Cross Dillard Scholar and an articles development editor for the Virginia Law Review.

== Career ==
From 2005—2006, Schwartzman clerked for Judge Paul V. Niemeyer of the United States Court of Appeals for the Fourth Circuit. He has served as a visiting professor of law at UCLA School of Law and the Hebrew University of Jerusalem as well as the William S. Beinecke Visiting Professor of Law at Columbia Law School. Schwartzman was elected to the American Law Institute in 2022.

== Publications ==
=== Selected Articles ===
- — (2012). "What If Religion Is Not Special?". University of Chicago Law Review. 79 (4): 1351-1427. JSTOR 23317717.
- — (2013). "Conscience, Speech, and Money". Virginia Law Review. 97 (2): 317-384. JSTOR 41261511.
- —; Kendrick, Leslie (2018). "The Etiquette of Animus". Harvard Law Review. 132 (1): 133-170. JSTOR 26799695.
- —; Wilson, Jocelyn (2019). "The Unreasonableness of Catholic Integralism". San Diego Law Review. 56 (4): 1039-1068.
- —; Schragger, Richard (2023). "Religious Freedom and Abortion". Iowa Law Review. 108 (5): 2299-2340.
- —; Schragger, Richard; Tebbe, Nelson (2025). "Reestablishing Religion". University of Chicago Law Review. 92 (1): 199-284. JSTOR 27376358.
