= Virginia Journal of Social Policy & the Law =

- Discipline: Law and social policy
- Language: English
- Edited by: Nikita Zinzuwadia

Publication details
- History: 1993-present
- Frequency: Triannually

Standard abbreviations
- Bluebook: Va. J. Soc. Pol'y & L.
- ISO 4: Va. J. Soc. Policy Law

Indexing
- ISSN: 1068-7955
- LCCN: 93643958
- OCLC no.: 233140548

Links
- Journal homepage

The Virginia Journal of Social Policy & the Law is a triannual student-edited law review published by students of the University of Virginia School of Law. It covers the intersection of law and social policy issues, including health care policy, welfare reform, criminal justice, voting rights, civil rights, family law, employment law, gender issues, education, and critical race theory.

The journal is ranked highly among many other student-edited law reviews, and is a leading journal in the United States concerning law and society. It is available in print and through online electronic databases such as Westlaw, LexisNexis, and HeinOnline.
