= Idea for a Universal History with a Cosmopolitan Purpose =

Essay by Immanuel Kant

"Idea for a Universal History with a Cosmopolitan Purpose" or "The Idea of a Universal History on a Cosmopolitical Plan" (German: Idee zu einer allgemeinen Geschichte in weltbürgerlicher Absicht) is a 1784 essay by the philosopher Immanuel Kant, a lecturer in anthropology and geography at Königsberg University.

== Overview ==
The essay was published in the December 1784 issue of the Berlinische Monatsschrift (Berlin Monthly) as Kant was gaining repute as a philosopher following the publication of his revolutionary treatise on epistemology, The Critique of Pure Reason (1781) and preceding his critique of ethical theory, Critique of Practical Reason (1788). "Idea for a Universal History with a Cosmopolitan Purpose" embroiled Kant in controversy due to the political implications of its critique of his contemporary Johann Gottfried Herder.

The essay proceeds by way of nine propositions through which Kant seeks to prove his claim that rational and moral autonomy will inevitably defeat the compulsions of self-interested individualism. Kant seeks to achieve this by advancing a hierarchical account of development of human history. In writing from the perspective of a universal history, Kant valorizes an unrealized future state (though he is aware of the problem of theorizing without empirical basis, recognizing the appearance of irrationality that such an enterprise exhibits and criticizing Herder for extracting conclusions from speculative psychologizing).

Kant classifies the constitutional republics of contemporary Western Europe—marked as they were by federalism, status-seeking, individualism and a degree of moral and cultural maturity—as belonging to an advanced, yet still intermediate, stage of development, judging them to be civilized but not thoroughly moral. All other societies are deemed inferior and judged according to the benchmark of European nation-states. Kant proposes that the European nations were tending towards statehood in a federation characterized by a universalist and cosmopolitan moral culture—a historical end-state also approached (albeit at a slower pace) by those inferior non-European societies, defined as they still were by the embrace of faith.

== See also ==
- Perpetual Peace: A Philosophical Sketch, a work by Kant on perpetual peace
- Federal Europe, a political aspiration of cosmopolitan Europeans
- Genealogical method, a mode of cultural theorising most memorably employed by Friedrich Nietzsche in the 19th century
- Phenomenology of Spirit, a seminal work by German Idealist philosopher Hegel which advances a determinist account of history
- Three Worlds Theory, according to which nations fall into one of three stages of development
- Crooked Timber, a political blog, referencing "Out of the crooked timber of humanity, no straight thing was ever made", (Note: The quote is a loose translation of the original German: "aus so krummem Holze, als woraus der Mensch gemacht ist, kann nichts ganz Gerades gezimmert werden" (literally: "from such crooked wood as man is made of, nothing perfectly straight can be built").) an aphorism from Kant's "Idea for a Universal History..."

== Bibliography ==
- Carvounas, David (2002). Diverging Time. Lexington: Lexington Books. ISBN 0-7391-0373-3.
- De Greiff, Pablo; Cronin, Ciaran P., eds. (2002). Global Justice and Transnational Politics. Cambridge: MIT Press. ISBN 0-262-54133-5.
- Kant, Immanuel (1927). de Quincey, Thomas (ed.). The Idea of a Universal History in a Cosmopolitical Plan. Hanover, New Hampshire: Sociological Press.
- Kant, Immanuel (1991). "Idea For A Universal History With A Cosmopolitan Purpose". In Reiss, H. S. (ed.). Kant. Cambridge Texts in the History of Political Thought (2nd ed.). Cambridge: Cambridge University Press. pp. 41–53. ISBN 0-521-39837-1.
- Kramer, Lloyd; Maza, Sarah, eds. (2002). A Companion to Western Historical Thought. Cambridge: Blackwell Publishers. ISBN 0-631-21714-2.
- Pagden, Anthony, ed. (2002). The Idea of Europe. Washington: Woodrow Wilson Center Press. ISBN 0-521-79552-4.
