= Weaponized interdependence =

Theory in international relations

Weaponized interdependence is a theory in international relations that describes how states can leverage asymmetrical interdependence within global production networks to coerce other actors. The concept was developed by Henry Farrell and Abraham Newman in 2019. They argued that states with political authority over the central "hubs" in global economic networks—such as those for finance, data, and trade—can exploit this position to gain a strategic advantage.

This is achieved through two primary mechanisms: the panopticon effect, which involves gathering critical information from data traffic flowing through hubs under control of a powerful state, and the chokepoint effect, which involves a state's ability to limit or deny other actors' access to the network.

The theory challenges earlier liberal views of complex interdependence, which primarily saw it as a source of cooperation and mutual benefit. Instead, weaponized interdependence posits that the very structures created to enhance market efficiency can be repurposed as tools of state power, turning focal points of cooperation into tools of control.

== Relation to liberal peace theory ==
Proponents of weaponized interdependence argue that the flaw in the liberal argument is not the premise that interdependence makes war costly, but the conclusion that states will therefore consistently behave peacefully. Farrell and Newman contend that liberal accounts have tended to avoid the question of power, focusing instead on mutual cooperative gains or suggesting that interdependence generates reciprocal, rather than one-sided, vulnerabilities. The theory of weaponized interdependence demonstrates how the very structures that liberals believe foster peace—global economic networks—can be repurposed for coercive ends. It suggests that states can exploit network asymmetries to inflict costs on others, effectively turning interdependence into a weapon rather than a source of peace.

== Theoretical background ==
The concept of weaponized interdependence emerged as an extension of the new interdependence approach (NIA), a research program developed by Farrell and Newman to update the classic theory of "complex interdependence". While complex interdependence, pioneered by Robert Keohane and Joseph Nye, focused on how bilateral relationships created vulnerabilities, it largely emphasized the dispersion of power and the potential for mutual gains.

Weaponized interdependence offers a structural explanation where the topography of networks themselves creates enduring power imbalances. It critiques liberal institutionalism for its assumption that because interdependence makes conflict costly, states will not use it for aggressive ends. In contrast, this theory argues that key global economic networks tend to evolve into centralized "hub-and-spoke systems" due to network effects and efficiency gains, rather than flat, decentralized webs. States that have jurisdiction over these hubs are uniquely positioned to exercise coercive power over other "nodes" in the network.

== Mechanisms ==
States that control network hubs can weaponize interdependence through two distinct effects.

=== Panopticon effect ===
The panopticon effect refers to the ability of a state to gather and exploit information by monitoring data flowing through a network hub it controls. The term is derived from Jeremy Bentham's Panopticon, an architectural design for a prison allowing a single central observer to potentially see all inmates (Michel Foucault applied the term to the modern technique of the social control in 1977). In a global network, a state with jurisdiction over a key hub can gain an informational advantage, allowing it to understand an adversary's intentions, tactics, and vulnerabilities. It is difficult for other actors to avoid these hubs, making it nearly impossible for them to communicate or transact without passing through them.

Panopticon effect predates the Internet by at least a century: during the first era of globalization, the British government enjoyed the benefits of the international financial flows going through the City of London and thus an ability to interrupt the flow of goods.

=== Chokepoint effect ===
The chokepoint effect is the ability of a state to restrict or deny other actors access to the network by controlling a critical hub. Because hubs offer significant efficiency benefits and are hard to circumvent, being denied access can impose substantial costs on a targeted state or private entity. This allows the controlling state to use the network as a tool to punish or coerce others, effectively turning the hub into a "chokepoint". The disconnection of a state from a critical network can be highly disruptive not only to its international transactions but also to its domestic economy, as internal actors may rely on the foreign-controlled hub, like a digital marketplace.

== Case studies ==
=== Financial networks and SWIFT ===
The SWIFT financial messaging system is a primary example of a centralized global network. Although technically being a Belgian cooperative, it has been subject to the jurisdiction of both the United States and the European Union.

- Panopticon: Following the September 11 attacks, the U.S. Treasury compelled SWIFT to secretly provide financial data for its Terrorist Finance Tracking Program (TFTP), using the network as a surveillance asset to monitor illicit activity worldwide.
- Chokepoint: In 2012, under joint pressure from the U.S. and EU, SWIFT was forced to disconnect sanctioned Iranian banks from its network as part of the effort to counter Iran's nuclear program. This action was described as the "financial market equivalent of crossing the nuclear threshold" and severely crippled Iran's banking sector.

=== The Internet and data flows ===
The physical and commercial architecture of the Internet is highly centralized, with a disproportionate number of hubs—including fiber optic cable landing sites, internet exchange points, and tech companies—located in the United States.

- Panopticon: The U.S. government has extensively used this "home-field advantage" for surveillance. Through NSA programs such as PRISM and Stellar Wind, it compelled U.S. technology and telecommunications companies to provide access to vast amounts of global data. The Snowden revelations exposed how this surveillance targeted foreign citizens and even allied leaders.
- Chokepoint: The U.S. has largely refrained from using the chokepoint effect on the internet, partly because of a strategic commitment to an "open internet" and partly because its domestic institutions are not designed to easily compel tech firms to cut off users.

=== Rare earth elements supply chain ===
The supply chain for rare earth elements (REEs) is a network in the material world that is vulnerable to weaponization. China controls over 90% of the world's REE processing, giving it asymmetric network power and chokepoint capabilities. REEs are critical for numerous consumer, military, and green energy technologies, including smartphones, precision-guided missiles, and electric vehicle motors.

The 2010 rare earths crisis is considered a potential case of weaponized interdependence. Following a maritime collision near the disputed Senkaku Islands, China was accused of halting REE exports to Japan, its largest trading partner for the minerals. Researchers debate whether the export reduction was a direct act of coercion or an acceleration of pre-planned industrial policy, but the event was treated as an act of weaponization by the U.S., Japan, and the EU, leading to a World Trade Organization case against China.

== Responses and implications ==
When states fear they will be targeted by weaponized interdependence, they are likely to pursue strategies of decoupling or de-risking to reduce their vulnerabilities. This backlash can lead to geoeconomic and geopolitical fragmentation.

After the 2010 rare earths crisis, the U.S., Japan, and the EU began efforts to diversify their REE supply chains away from China to reduce its chokepoint power.

Threats to disconnect Russia from SWIFT following the Ukraine crisis prompted Russia to explore creating alternative payment systems to become less dependent on the U.S. dollar.

The European Union has sought to mitigate its vulnerabilities in the digital sector through regulation. Research suggests the EU is highly vulnerable to the panopticon effect from both the U.S. and China, with the GDPR having almost no effect on the foreign surveillance of EU data. However, the EU is considered less vulnerable to the chokepoint effect, as no single rival state has both high market dominance and sufficiently strained diplomatic relations to make a cutoff likely. Regulations like the Digital Markets Act are intended to further insulate the EU from future chokepoint threats.

== Sources ==
- Farrell, Henry; Newman, Abraham L. (2019). "Weaponized Interdependence: How Global Economic Networks Shape State Coercion". International Security. 44 (1): 42–79. doi:10.1162/ISEC_a_00351.
- Hutchinson, Annabelle Diana (September 2023). The Once and Future Crisis: Rare Earth Elements and Weaponized Interdependence in a Networked World (Dissertation). University of Oxford.
- Lehdonvirta, Vili; Wú, Boxi; Hawkins, Zoe (2025). "Weaponised interdependence in a bipolar world: how economic forces and security interests shape the global reach of US and Chinese cloud data centres". Review of International Political Economy. 32 (5): 1442–1467. doi:10.1080/09692290.2025.2489077. eISSN 1466-4526. ISSN 0969-2290.
- Tamim, James (3 May 2024). The GDPR and DMA Mitigating Vulnerabilities to Weaponized Interdependence in the EU. European Digital Policy Initiative (Preprint). European Digital Policy Initiative (EDPI). pp. 1–20. doi:10.13140/RG.2.2.12440.40966.
