= Virginia Law Weekly =

Newspaper in Charlottesville, Virginia

- Type: Student newspaper
- Format: Tabloid
- Owner: University of Virginia School of Law
- Editor-in-chief: Bradley J. Berklich and Kelly C. Wu
- Founded: 1948
- Headquarters: Charlottesville, Virginia
- Price: Free
- Website: lawweekly.org

Virginia Law Weekly is a weekly newspaper published by students at the University of Virginia School of Law each Wednesday of the school year, excluding breaks and exam periods. In 2006, 2007, 2008, 2017, 2018, 2019, and 2025 the Law Weekly was recognized as Best Law School Newspaper by the Law Student Division of the American Bar Association.

== History ==
Virginia Law Weekly was first printed in 1948 and has been cited by several courts in published judicial opinions, including the U.S. Supreme Court (Patterson v. New York (1977)), the Fifth Circuit (Thermo King v. White's Trucking Service, 292 F.2d 668 (5th Cir. 1961)), and numerous state courts.

Virginia Law Weekly was first published online in the late 1990s, providing a downloadable PDF version of each week's edition. Features Editor Joey Katzen '07 relaunched the website as a full-featured interactive newspaper site in the spring of 2005. Technology Editor David Markoff '17 redesigned the website in 2016, and Editor-in-Chief Andrew Allard '25 redesigned the website most recently in 2025.
