= Henry Farrell (political scientist) =

Irish-american political scientist

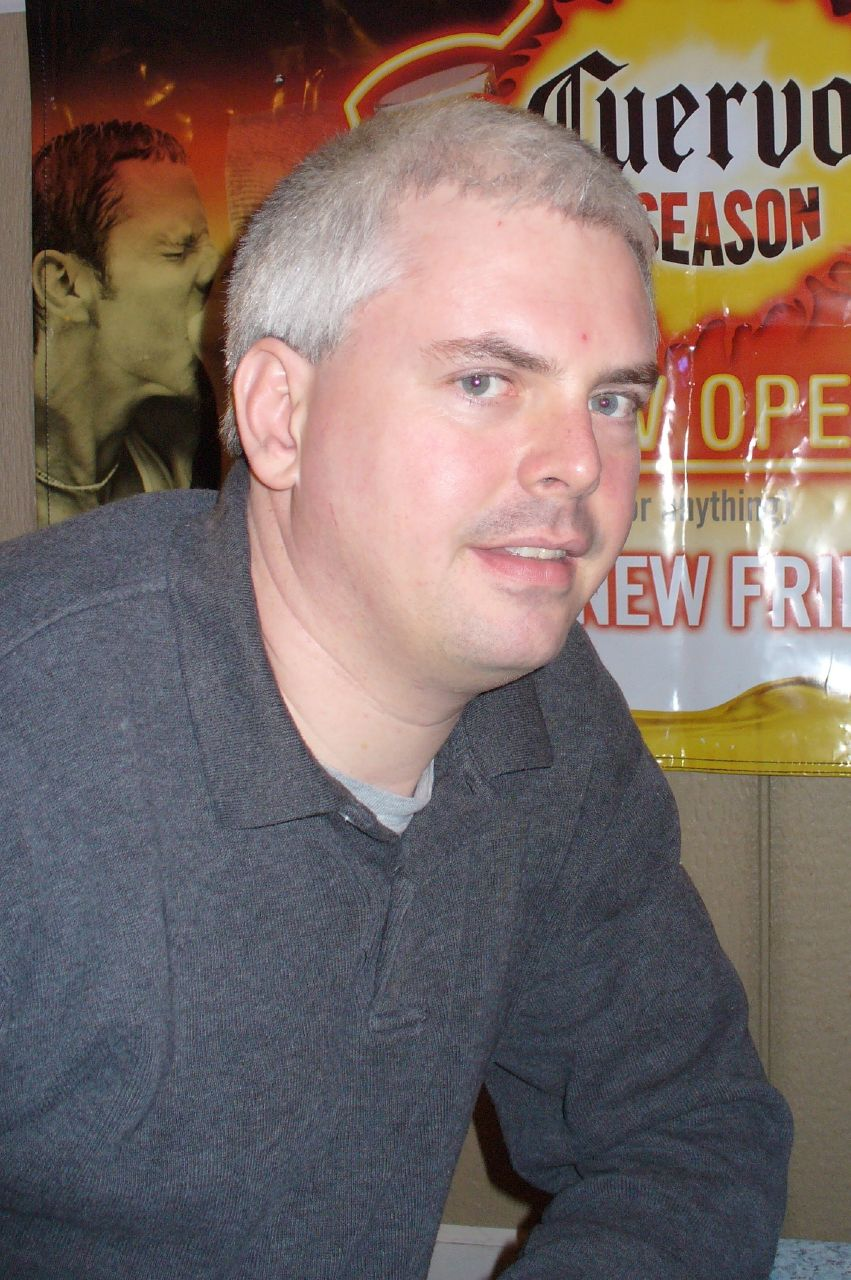
- Born: June 30, 1970 (age 56); Ireland

Academic background
- Education: Georgetown University (Ph.D.); University College Dublin (B.A. and M.A.)

Academic work
- School or tradition: Political scientist
- Institutions: Johns Hopkins University

Henry Farrell is an Irish-born political scientist at Johns Hopkins University. He previously taught at the University of Toronto and earned his PhD from Georgetown University. His research interests include trust and co-operation; e-commerce; the European Union; and institutional theory. He is an elected member of the Council on Foreign Relations.

A major contribution has been in his work with Abraham Newman on weaponized interdependence.

== Early life and education ==
Henry Farrell grew up in Ireland; first in Dublin, then in a small town in Tipperary.

== Career ==
Farrell left Ireland in 1993; since then, he has lived in Brussels, Washington DC, Florence, Bonn and Toronto.

== Work ==
Farrell is a member of the Crooked Timber group blog. He has written articles on blogging for Foreign Policy and The Chronicle of Higher Education. He has written for the Washington Post blog, Monkey Cage, including as editor-in-chief from 2019 to 2022. He published an essay in The Economist in 2023 on the "religious schism" seen among AI engineers, and another essay on the similarity of AI models to older forms of knowledge integration.

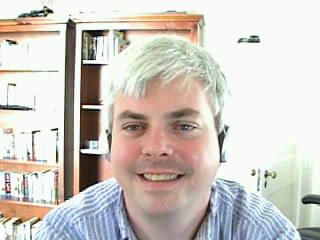
Farrell taking part in a BloggingHeads.tv conversation.

== Books ==
- The Political Economy of Trust: Institutions, Interests and Inter-Firm Cooperation in Italy and Germany. Cambridge University Press. 2009.
- Henry Farrell; Abraham Newman (2019). Privacy and Power: The Transatlantic Struggle Over Freedom and Security. Princeton University Press.
- Henry Farrell; Abraham Newman (2023). Underground Empire: How America Weaponized the World Economy. Henry Holt and Company.
