= Leslie Kendrick =

American legal scholar (born 1976)

13th Dean of the University of Virginia School of Law
- Incumbent
- Assumed office July 1, 2024
- Preceded by: Risa L. Goluboff

Personal details
- Born: 1976 (age 49–50)
- Education: University of North Carolina, Chapel Hill (BA); Magdalen College, Oxford (MPhil, DPhil); University of Virginia (JD)

Leslie Carolyn Kendrick (born 1976) is an American legal scholar who serves as the dean of the University of Virginia School of Law, where she is also the Arnold H. Leon Professor of Law.

== Early life and education ==
Kendrick was born in Floyd County, Kentucky, to William Kendrick, an attorney, and Leatha Kendrick, a poet and writing instructor. Her parents had met while they were students at the University of Kentucky.

Kendrick was educated at the University of North Carolina at Chapel Hill, earning a Bachelor of Arts (B.A.) in classics and English as a Morehead Scholar in 1998, then studied at the University of Oxford as a Rhodes Scholar. She received a Master of Philosophy (M.Phil.) and a D.Phil. from Magdalen College in 2000 and 2003, respectively. Her dissertation was titled "John Milton and the transformation of Virgilian pathos". Afterwards, she attended the University of Virginia School of Law, where she was a Hardy Cross Dillard Scholar and an editor of the Virginia Law Review, graduating with a Juris Doctor (J.D.) in 2006.

== Career ==
After graduating from law school, Kendrick was a law clerk for Judge J. Harvie Wilkinson III of the U.S. Court of Appeals for the Fourth Circuit then clerked for Justice David Souter at the U.S. Supreme Court.

Kendrick was an associate professor of law at the University of Virginia from 2008 to 2013, then was promoted to a full-time professor of law in 2013. She served as the law school's vice-dean from 2017 to 2021. The school announced on December 18, 2023, that Kendrick would serve as dean of the law school, succeeding Risa L. Goluboff on July 1, 2024.

Kendrick is a member of the American Law Institute.
