= Abraham L. Newman =

American political scientist and professor

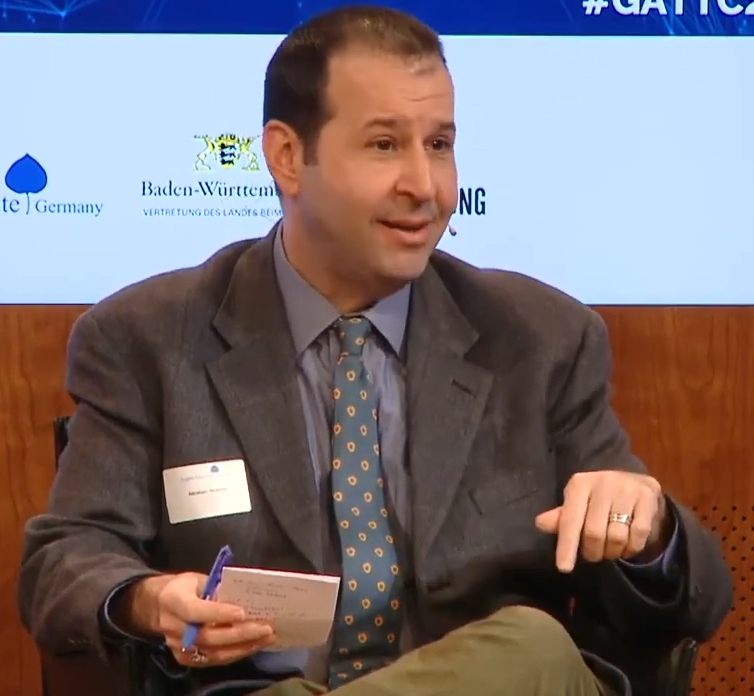
Newman on a discussion panel in 2023.

Abraham L. Newman (born 1973) is an American political scientist and professor in the Edmund A. Walsh School of Foreign Service and Government Department at Georgetown University. His research focuses on the ways in which economic interdependence and globalization have transformed international politics. His work has appeared in publications such as the Financial Times, Foreign Affairs, and The New York Times.

== Education and career ==
Newman was raised in Columbus, Ohio. He graduated from Stanford University with a BA in International Relations and an MA in International Political Economy in 1996. In 2005, he received his PhD in Political Science from the University of California, Berkeley. He has spent many years in Germany and is fluent in German. Within the field of international political economy, Newman's research has included topics such as digital technology and data privacy as well as global finance. Most recently, Newman and Henry Farrell coined the term “weaponized interdependence” to describe the ways in which states are increasingly using economic networks as tools of coercion to achieve strategic goals.

== Books ==
- Henry Farrell and Abraham Newman, Underground Empire: How America Weaponized the World Economy, Henry Holt, 2023, 288 pp.
- Of Privacy and Power: The Transatlantic Struggle over Freedom and Security by Henry Farrell and Abraham Newman, Princeton University Press, 2019
  - Roy C. Palmer Civil Liberties Prize; Best Book Award, the International Studies Association International Communication Section; Foreign Affairs Best Books of 2019
- Voluntary Disruptions: International Soft Law, Finance, and Power by Abraham Newman and Elliot Posner, Oxford University Press, 2018
  - Honorable Mention, APSA International Collaboration Section Best Book Award; Honorable Mention, ISA International Law Section Best Book Award
- Protectors of Privacy: Regulating Personal Data in the Global Economy by Abraham Newman, Cornell University Press, 2008
- How Revolutionary was the Digital Revolution: National responses, market transitions, and global technology by John Zysman and Abraham Newman, Stanford University Press, 2006

== Selected articles ==
- Farrell, Henry and Abraham Newman. 2020. “Will the Coronavirus End Globalization as we know it?” Foreign Affairs. March 16, 2020.
- Farrell, Henry and Abraham Newman. 2019. “Weaponized Interdependence,” International Security. 44(1): 42–79.
- Kalyanpur, Nikhil and Abraham Newman. 2019. “Mobilizing Market Power: Jurisdictional Expansion and Stock Market Delisting,” International Organization. 73(1): 1-34.
- Farrell, Henry and Abraham Newman. 2017. “BREXIT, Voice and Loyalty: Rethinking electoral politics in an age of interdependence,” Review of International Political Economy. 24(2): 232–47.
- Efrat, Asif and Abraham Newman. 2016. “Deciding to Defer: The Importance of Fairness in Resolving Transnational Jurisdictional Conflicts,” International Organization. 70(2): 409–41.
- Farrell, Henry and Abraham Newman. 2016. “The New Interdependence Approach: Theoretical Developments and Empirical Demonstrations,” Review of International Political Economy. 23(5): 713–36.
- Newman, Abraham and Elliot Posner. 2016. “Transnational Feedbacks, Soft Law, and Preferences in Global Financial Regulation,” Review of International Political Economy. 23(1): 123–52.
- Farrell, Henry and Abraham Newman. 2014. “Domestic Institutions Beyond the Nation State: Charting the new interdependence approach,” World Politics. 66(2): 331–63.
- Kaczmarek, Sarah and Abraham Newman. 2011. “The Long Arm of the Law: Extraterritoriality and the National Implementation of Foreign Bribery Legislation,” International Organization. 65(4): 745–70.
- Farrell, Henry and Abraham Newman. 2010. “Making Global Markets: Historical institutionalism in international political economy,” Review of International Political Economy. 17(4): 609–38.
- Bach, David and Abraham Newman. 2010. “Transgovernmental Networks and Domestic Policy Convergence: Evidence from insider trading regulation,” International Organization. 64(3): 505–528.
- Newman, Abraham. 2008. “Building Transnational Civil Liberties: Transgovernmental entrepreneurs and the European data privacy directive,” International Organization. 62(1): 103–130.
- Eberlein, Burkard and Abraham Newman. 2008. “Escaping the International Governance Dilemma? Incorporated transgovernmental networks in the European Union,” Governance. 21(1): 25–53.
- Bach, David and Abraham Newman. 2007. “The European Regulatory State and Global Public Policy: Micro-institutions, macro-influence,” Journal of European Public Policy. 16(6): 827–846.
