= Robert E. Scott =

Law professor (born 1944)

- Born: February 25, 1943; Nagpur, India
- Education: Oberlin College; College of William & Mary (JD); University of Michigan (SJD)
- Occupation: Professor
- Organization(s): University of Virginia; Columbia University; College of William & Mary
- Spouse: Elizabeth Scott

Robert E. Scott (born 25 February 1943 in Nagpur, India) is a Law Professor at Columbia Law School. Scott graduated from Oberlin College (cum laude) and received his J.D. degree in 1968 from William and Mary Law School where he was editor-in-chief of the William and Mary Law Review. (Scott met his wife, Elizabeth "Buffie" Scott, also a Columbia Law Professor, while at Oberlin College.) Scott earned an S.J.D. from the University of Michigan Law School in 1973, after which he joined the law faculty at William & Mary.

In 1974, Scott joined the Virginia School of Law faculty, where he served from 1974 to 2006. He served as Dean of the Law School from 1991 to 2001. Under his leadership, the School completed a $203 million capital campaign in 2000.

Scott became a full-time professor at Columbia Law School in July 2006 after accepting appointment as the Alfred McCormack Professor of Law and Director of the Center on Contract and Economic Organization. He had been a frequent visiting professor at Columbia, most recently as Justin W. D'Atri Visiting Professor of Law, Business and Society from 2001-2006. In 2007 Scott co-published an article with Alan Schwartz in the Harvard Law Review.

On August 5, 2008, Governor Tim Kaine appointed Scott to the Board of Visitors of the College of William & Mary, where Scott earned his law degree in 1968. In 2012, Scott was reappointed to the Board by governor Bob McDonnell. Scott's term will expire in 2016.
