= University of Virginia School of Law =

Public law school in Charlottesville, Virginia

- Parent school: University of Virginia
- Established: 1819; 207 years ago
- School type: Public law school
- Endowment: $954 million (2025)
- Parent endowment: $15.5 billion (2025)
- Dean: Leslie Kendrick
- Location: Charlottesville, Virginia, United States
- Enrollment: 919 J.D., 32 LL.M., 7 S.J.D. (2025)
- Faculty: 106 resident (2024–25)
- USNWR ranking: 4th (tie) (2026)
- Website: law.virginia.edu
- ABA profile: Standard 509 Report

The University of Virginia School of Law (UVA Law or Virginia Law) is the law school of the University of Virginia, a public research university in Charlottesville, Virginia. Established in 1819 as one of the original schools of Thomas Jefferson's university, it is the second-oldest continuously operating law school in the United States. Law classes began in 1826 on the Lawn, now a UNESCO World Heritage Site, and the school has occupied its own campus on the university's North Grounds since 1974. Although UVA is a state university, the law school receives no state appropriation and operates under an arrangement the university calls financial self-sufficiency, funding itself through tuition, its endowment and private giving.

The school enrolls roughly 300 students in each J.D. class and also awards the LL.M. and S.J.D. degrees. It offers more than 275 courses a year, including 24 clinics, along with 12 international exchange programs, 25 research centers and programs, and 10 student-edited journals, among them the Virginia Law Review.

The school has more than 20,000 living alumni. Over its two centuries its students have included President Woodrow Wilson, who studied law at the school in 1879–80; Vice President Alben W. Barkley; Supreme Court justices James Clark McReynolds and Stanley Forman Reed; senators Robert F. Kennedy and Ted Kennedy; FBI director and special counsel Robert Mueller; Secretary of Homeland Security Janet Napolitano; and the sitting presidents or chief justices of the International Court of Justice, the Supreme Court of Ireland and the Supreme Court of Virginia.

== History ==
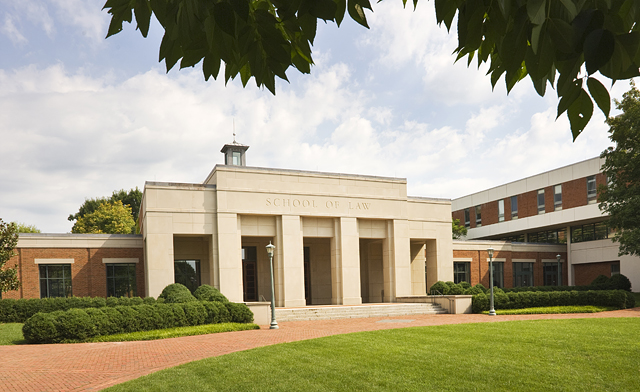
The law school's main entrance on North Grounds

=== Nineteenth century ===
The Virginia General Assembly chartered the University of Virginia in 1819 with a "department" of law among its original schools; Thomas Jefferson served as the university's first rector. The first law classes were taught in 1826 by John Tayloe Lomax in Pavilion III on the Lawn, and the first students completed the law course and passed its examinations in 1829. Lomax resigned in 1830 and was succeeded by John A. G. Davis, who lived and taught in Pavilion X. In 1840 Davis was fatally shot while trying to subdue rioting students on the Lawn, an event that led the university to adopt its honor system in 1842. The school awarded its first Bachelor of Laws degree in 1841.

John B. Minor, a member of the class of 1834, joined the faculty in 1845 and taught for half a century until his death in 1895, carrying the school through the American Civil War with a handful of students and, in 1865, helping to ensure that the university was spared when federal troops passed through Charlottesville. Classes moved to the newly built Rotunda Annex in 1853. When fire destroyed the Annex and spread to the Rotunda in 1895, Minor's son and colleague Raleigh C. Minor saved the law book collection.

=== Twentieth century ===
William Minor Lile was appointed the law department's first dean in 1904, the same year Edwin Alderman became the university's first president; a high-school diploma became a prerequisite for law study. The university required three years of study for the law degree beginning in 1909, and in 1911 the department moved into Minor Hall, named for John B. Minor. The Virginia Law Review began publication in 1913.

The university's professional schools opened to women in 1921, and Elizabeth N. Tompkins became the law school's first woman graduate in 1923; her correspondence records the isolation of being the school's only woman student, and the university did not open all of its schools to women until 1970. In 1932 the school moved to Clark Hall, a gift of alumnus William Andrews Clark Jr., and Armistead Dobie became its second dean. Dobie's ill health forced him to hand over his duties in 1937 to F. D. G. Ribble, who served as acting dean before being appointed dean in 1939. During World War II an accelerated program allowed students to finish in two years; after the war, first-year courses were offered year-round to accommodate more than 700 returning veterans, the first LL.M. degrees were awarded in 1946–47, and the Virginia Law Weekly was founded in 1948.

Racial integration came only through litigation. In January 1950 the law faculty voted, with one dissent, to admit Gregory Swanson, a Black attorney from Danville who had applied for graduate study; on July 14 the university's Board of Visitors overrode the faculty and rejected him, asserting that Virginia's constitution and laws forbade teaching white and Black students in the same school, even though the Supreme Court had decided Sweatt v. Painter and McLaurin v. Oklahoma State Regents against segregated graduate education the previous month. Represented by Thurgood Marshall, Oliver Hill, Spottswood Robinson and Martin A. Martin of the NAACP Legal Defense and Educational Fund, Swanson sued in federal court in Charlottesville, and on September 5, 1950, a three-judge panel ordered the university to admit him after a thirty-minute hearing, making him the first Black student at the University of Virginia or at any historically white institution in the former Confederacy. He was barred from living with his classmates and left after a single year without completing the LL.M. John F. Merchant became the school's first Black graduate in 1958, and Elaine Jones, who entered in 1967 as one of eleven women and two Black students in her class and later became the first woman to lead the Legal Defense Fund, became its first Black woman graduate in 1970.

Hardy Cross Dillard succeeded Ribble as dean in 1963, the year the Virginia Journal of International Law began publication, and Monrad G. Paulsen followed in 1968. In 1974 the school left Clark Hall for a new building on North Grounds, later named Henry Malcolm Withers Hall; a second phase, now Walter L. Brown Hall, was completed in 1978 as enrollment passed 1,100. A capital campaign begun in 1991 under Dean Robert E. Scott funded a renovation and expansion of the North Grounds complex, including Clay Hall (begun 1995) and the David A. Harrison III Law Grounds, dedicated in 1997. The campaign closed in 2000 having raised $203 million, at the time the largest in American legal education.

=== Twenty-first century ===
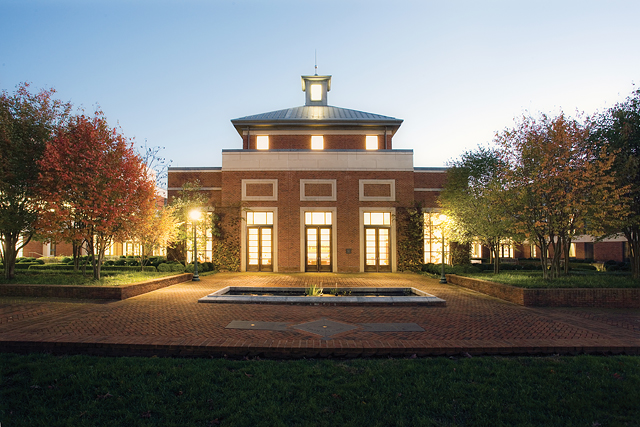
Clay Hall and Caplin Pavilion

The HMZ | Class of 1975 Student-Faculty Center opened in 2002 under Dean John C. Jeffries Jr. A second campaign, completed in 2012 under Dean Paul G. Mahoney, raised $173.9 million and built the Karsh Student Services Center, which houses admissions, financial aid, career counseling and clinic space. Risa L. Goluboff became the school's twelfth dean and first woman dean in 2016; the "Honor the Future" campaign conducted during her tenure (2019–25) raised $508 million in gifts and pledges. Leslie Kendrick, a 2006 graduate, became the thirteenth dean and the first alumna to hold the post in 2024. In June 2025 James E. Ryan, a 1992 graduate and member of the law faculty who had been president of the university since 2018, resigned under pressure from the United States Department of Justice, whose Civil Rights Division—headed by 1993 graduate Harmeet Dhillon—had been investigating the university's diversity programs and admissions and had threatened federal funding; in a letter to the faculty senate that November, Ryan accused the Board of Visitors of dishonesty in the negotiations that led to his departure. The school marked the 200th anniversary of its first law classes in 2026 with the publication of Legal Education at the University of Virginia: Tradition and Transformation by the University of Virginia Press.

== Campus and finances ==
The law school is located on North Grounds, about a mile from the university's central Grounds, adjacent to the Darden School of Business and the North Grounds Recreation Center. Its buildings include Withers Hall (1974), Brown Hall (1978), Clay Hall (1995), the Harrison Law Grounds (1997), the HMZ | Class of 1975 Student-Faculty Center (2002) and the Karsh Student Services Center (2012). The Arthur J. Morris Law Library holds more than 820,000 volumes, including collections of federal, state and international documents, manuscripts and archives.

Under an arrangement negotiated by Dean John C. Jeffries Jr. in the early 2000s and described by the school as without precedent in American public legal education, the law school forgoes state appropriations, pays its own overhead, remits ten percent of its tuition revenue to the university, and sets tuition at the level of its private competitors; the proposal drew concern from legislators and alumni when it was first floated. One consequence is that Virginia residents receive little tuition preference: in 2025–26 the in-state discount was $3,000 on tuition and fees of roughly $78,000. As of June 30, 2025, the market value of endowments held for the school's benefit was $954 million. At least 43 percent of alumni have made gifts in each of the past 20 years; in the 2025–26 campaign 43.6 percent gave, and gifts totaled $19 million.

== Admissions ==
For the class entering in the fall of 2026 (the Class of 2029), 303 J.D. students matriculated from 6,508 applicants. The median LSAT score was 173 (25th–75th percentiles: 168–175) and the median undergraduate GPA was 3.99 (3.82–4.04). Students came from 37 states, the District of Columbia and 124 undergraduate institutions; 73 percent had prior work or postgraduate experience, and ages ranged from 20 to 37. Total J.D. enrollment was 919 as of October 2025.

The LL.M. program, which enrolled 32 students in 2025, provides an American legal education to lawyers who hold a first law degree from another country; LL.M. students take classes alongside J.D. students and design their own course of study. The S.J.D. program, with seven candidates in 2025, is intended primarily for aspiring legal academics. In 2024–25 the school awarded 308 J.D., 54 LL.M. and 2 S.J.D. degrees.

=== Cost of attendance ===
Tuition and required fees for the 2025–26 academic year were $77,900 for Virginia residents and $80,900 for nonresidents in the J.D. and LL.M. programs. In 2024–25, 607 J.D. students received scholarships totaling $23.5 million, with a median award of $35,000.

== Academics ==
The J.D. curriculum offers more than 275 courses and seminars each year, 14 combination-degree programs with other UVA schools, and four dual-degree programs. Curricular programs include Law & Business and Law and Public Service, as well as programs in international law, legal and constitutional history, criminal law, human rights, race and law, environmental and land-use law, immigration law, intellectual property, public policy and regulation, health law, law and humanities, and animal law, alongside legal writing, professional ethics, trial advocacy and other practical-skills courses. The student–faculty ratio is 5.74 to 1, with 106 resident faculty members in 2024–25, of whom 19 are former U.S. Supreme Court clerks and 24 hold doctorates in fields other than law.

=== Clinics ===
The school operates 24 clinics. The Supreme Court Litigation Clinic, founded in 2006, won two unanimous decisions in the Court's 2024 term, Cunningham v. Cornell University and Ames v. Ohio Department of Youth Services. Its representation of Marlean Ames, a heterosexual state employee alleging she was passed over in favor of gay colleagues, drew objections from the school's Lambda Law Alliance and from progressive commentators, who argued that a pro bono clinic should not advance a claim they viewed as serving a conservative agenda; the clinic's director, Xiao Wang, defended the choice on the ground that the clinic represents individuals rather than causes. The clinics are:

- Appellate Litigation
- Civil Rights
- Community Organization and Social Enterprise
- Criminal Defense
- Decarceration and Community Reentry
- Economic and Consumer Justice
- Entrepreneurial Law
- Environmental Law and Community Engagement
- Federal Criminal Sentencing Advocacy
- First Amendment Law
- Health and Disability Law
- Holistic Youth Defense
- Housing Litigation
- Immigration Law
- Innocence Project
- International Human Rights
- Nonprofit
- Patent and Licensing
- Project for Informed Reform
- Prosecution
- State and Local Government Policy
- Supreme Court Litigation
- Workplace Rights
- Youth Advocacy

=== Study abroad ===
Students may participate in 12 international exchange programs. Rising third-year students may pursue a dual degree with Sciences Po in Paris, earning a French law diploma and the Virginia J.D., and students may also spend a semester abroad through a student-initiated program or an external studies project.

=== Institutes and centers ===
The school's faculty-directed centers and programs include:

- Animal Law Program
- Center for Civil Rights and Civil Liberties
- Center for Criminal Justice
- Center for Empirical Studies in Law
- Center for International & Comparative Law
- Center for Law & Philosophy
- Center for Public Law and Political Economy
- Center for the Study of Race and Law
- Center on Intellectual Property Law
- Education Rights Institute
- Family Law Center
- Health Law Program
- Immigration, Migration, and Human Rights Program
- Institute of Law, Psychiatry, and Public Policy
- John M. Olin Program in Law and Economics
- John W. Glynn, Jr. Law & Business Program
- Karsh Center for Law and Democracy
- LawTech Center
- Legal History Program
- National Security Law Center
- PLACE: Program in Law, Communities and the Environment
- Program in Law and Public Service
- Program in Public Policy and Regulation
- Program on Constitutional Law
- Supreme Court and Appellate Litigation Program
- Virginia Center for Tax Law

=== Law journals ===
Students edit 10 academic journals, including the Virginia Law Review, one of the most cited law journals in the country, and the Virginia Journal of International Law, the oldest student-edited international law journal in the United States.

- Journal of Law and Politics
- Virginia Environmental Law Journal
- Virginia Journal of Criminal Law
- Virginia Journal of International Law
- Virginia Journal of Law & Technology
- Virginia Journal of Social Policy & the Law
- Virginia Law & Business Review
- Virginia Law Review
- Virginia Sports & Entertainment Law Journal
- Virginia Tax Review

== Rankings ==
UVA Law tied for fourth with the University of Pennsylvania Carey Law School in the 2026 U.S. News & World Report law school rankings, behind Stanford, Yale and Chicago. In the 2026 Above the Law rankings, which weight employment outcomes, the school ranked third. The Princeton Review ranked UVA Law first among law schools for "Best Quality of Life," "Best Professors" and "Best Classroom Experience," seventh for "Toughest to Get Into," and fifth for "Career Prospects" in its 2026 rankings; the school has held the top spot for "Best Professors" in seven of the past eight years. The 2026 QS World University Rankings by subject placed the school 47th worldwide and 14th in the United States for law.

== Employment outcomes ==
According to the school's American Bar Association employment disclosures, 304 of the 308 members of the Class of 2025 (98.7 percent) were employed ten months after graduation; 99.3 percent of those held positions requiring bar admission, and all were full-time and long-term. Nine graduates (2.9 percent) held school-funded public-service fellowships. Of employed graduates, 76.3 percent joined law firms, 84.9 percent of them at firms of more than 500 attorneys; 12.2 percent took judicial clerkships, 89.2 percent of them in federal courts; and 10.8 percent entered government or public-interest work. The median reported private-sector salary was $225,000.

=== Law firms ===
As of May 2026, UVA Law ranked fifth among law schools in the number of alumni partners at the American Lawyer 100 firms and had graduates at all 100 of those firms; a November 2025 Law360 analysis ranked it second, after Harvard, in the number of alumni serving as chief legal officers of the nation's 500 largest public companies.

=== Clerkships ===
The school ranked fifth, after Harvard, Yale, Stanford and Chicago, in placing clerks on the Supreme Court of the United States from 2007 to 2026, and sixth in the percentage of graduates from the classes of 2023–25 who went directly to federal clerkships. Over the 2022–27 clerkship terms, alumni held 88 clerkships on the U.S. courts of appeals and 155 on federal district and other federal courts. In 2016 alumni set a school record for appellate clerkships in a single term, and in 2024 more than 100 alumni were clerking nationwide.

== Student life ==
The school recognizes about 75 student organizations, including chapters of the Federalist Society and the American Constitution Society. The Virginia Law Weekly, the student-run newspaper founded in 1948, has been cited in court opinions, including Justice Lewis F. Powell Jr.'s dissent in Patterson v. New York (1977), and has received the American Bar Association's Best Newspaper Award in 2006, 2007, 2008, 2017, 2018, 2019 and 2025.

The Libel Show, a student-written musical comedy that roasts the faculty and law school life, has been performed each spring since its origin as a Phi Delta Phi fraternity ritual on the steps of the Rotunda in the first decade of the twentieth century; the school's own histories date the first show variously to 1903 and 1908. The school also hosts the UVA Law Softball Invitational, a charity tournament that draws teams from dozens of law schools and benefits ReadyKids, a Charlottesville children's services organization, and the student Public Interest Law Association; the 2026 tournament raised more than $55,000.

== Notable alumni ==
The school counts two justices of the Supreme Court of the United States among its alumni: James Clark McReynolds, who took his law degree in 1884 and served on the Court from 1914 to 1941, and Stanley Forman Reed, who studied law at Virginia and Columbia without taking a degree and served from 1938 to 1957. Graduates of the LL.M. and S.J.D. programs have led three national and international high courts: Asher Grunis (LL.M. 1972) as president of the Supreme Court of Israel, Donal O'Donnell (LL.M. 1983) as Chief Justice of Ireland, and Yuji Iwasawa (S.J.D. 1997) as president of the International Court of Justice since 2025. Hardy Cross Dillard, a 1927 graduate and later dean, sat on the International Court of Justice from 1970 to 1979. Federal appellate judges among the alumni include J. Harvie Wilkinson III and J. Michael Luttig of the Fourth Circuit and Janice Rogers Brown (LL.M. 2004) of the D.C. Circuit; Cleo E. Powell (1982) was elected chief justice of the Supreme Court of Virginia in 2025.

In national politics, Woodrow Wilson studied at the school in 1879–80 before withdrawing for reasons of health, and Alben W. Barkley, vice president under Harry S. Truman, attended in 1897. Senators who graduated from the school include Robert F. Kennedy (1951), Ted Kennedy (1959), John Warner (1953), Lowell Weicker (1958), Hugh Scott (1922), John C. Stennis (1927), Kit Bond (1963), Bill Nelson (1968), Angus King (1969), Evan Bayh (1981), Sheldon Whitehouse (1982), John Neely Kennedy (1977) and John Cornyn (LL.M. 1995); as of 2025 four sitting senators and one representative were alumni. Governors include Andy Beshear of Kentucky (2003), Luis Fortuño of Puerto Rico (1985), Charles Robb (1973), Gerald Baliles (1967), George Allen (1977) and Jim Gilmore (1977) of Virginia, and Janet Napolitano of Arizona (1983), who later served as Secretary of Homeland Security and president of the University of California. Other executive-branch alumni include Robert Mueller (1973), FBI director and special counsel; Frank Wisner (1934), who ran covert operations for the Office of Strategic Services and the Central Intelligence Agency; Mortimer Caplin (1940), commissioner of the Internal Revenue Service; Kirstjen Nielsen (1999), Secretary of Homeland Security; Jamieson Greer (2007), United States Trade Representative; and Andrew N. Ferguson (2012), chairman of the Federal Trade Commission.

Beyond law and government, alumni include Major League Baseball commissioner Bowie Kuhn (1950), PGA Tour commissioner Tim Finchem (1973), Southeastern Conference commissioner Mike Slive (1965) and NFL Players Association executive director DeMaurice Smith (1989); novelists Louis Auchincloss (1941), Linda Fairstein (1972), David Baldacci (1986) and Emily Giffin (1997); New York Times crossword editor Will Shortz (1977); broadcaster Laura Ingraham (1991); former NBC chief executive Bob Wright (1968); investor Bruce Karsh (1980), co-founder of Oaktree Capital Management, for whom the school's Karsh Center for Law and Democracy is named; and Elizabeth Garrett (1988), president of Cornell University. Environmental lawyer and cabinet secretary Robert F. Kennedy Jr. graduated in 1979.

== Deans ==
- William Minor Lile, 1904–1932
- Armistead Dobie, 1932–1937
- F. D. G. Ribble, 1937–1939 (acting); 1939–1963
- Hardy C. Dillard, 1963–1968
- Monrad G. Paulsen, 1968–1976
- Emerson Spies, 1976–1980
- Richard A. Merrill, 1980–1988
- Thomas H. Jackson, 1988–1991
- Robert E. Scott, 1991–2001
- John C. Jeffries Jr., 2001–2008
- Paul G. Mahoney, 2008–2016
- Risa L. Goluboff, 2016–2024
- Leslie Kendrick, 2024–present

== Notable faculty ==
=== Current faculty ===
- Kenneth Abraham – insurance law, torts
- Richard Bonnie (LL.B. 1969) – criminal law, bioethics, public policy
- Danielle Citron – privacy, free expression, civil rights
- Anne Coughlin – criminal law, feminist jurisprudence
- Ashley Deeks – national security, international law, laws of war
- John F. Duffy – patent law, international intellectual property, administrative law
- Amanda Frost – civil procedure, immigration law, federal courts, constitutional law
- Risa L. Goluboff – former dean; legal history, constitutional law, civil rights
- John C. Harrison – constitutional law, administrative law, constitutional history
- A. E. Dick Howard (LL.B. 1961) – constitutional law, comparative constitutionalism
- John C. Jeffries Jr. (J.D. 1973) – former dean; criminal law, constitutional law, civil rights
- Leslie Kendrick (J.D. 2006) – dean; torts, First Amendment
- Paul G. Mahoney – former dean; securities regulation, corporations
- John Monahan – social science in law, mental health law
- Caleb Nelson – civil procedure, federal courts
- Cynthia Nicoletti – legal history, constitutional history, property
- Saikrishna Bangalore Prakash – constitutional law, public law
- James E. Ryan (J.D. 1992) – education law, constitutional law; president of the University of Virginia 2018–2025
- Micah Schwartzman (J.D. 2005) – law and religion, legal theory, constitutional law
- John Setear – international law, international environmental law, foreign relations
- Lawrence Solum – philosophy of law, constitutional theory, procedure
- Barbara Spellman – psychology and the law, evidence, empirical methods
- Steven Walt – commercial law, contracts, bankruptcy
- G. Edward White – legal history, constitutional law, torts

=== Former faculty ===
- Lillian BeVier (1973–2010) – constitutional law, intellectual property
- Jonathan Cannon – environmental law; Blaine T. Phillips Distinguished Professor of Environmental Law Emeritus
- Douglas Laycock – constitutional law, religious liberty, remedies
- M. Elizabeth Magill (J.D. 1995) – dean of Georgetown University Law Center since 2026; former provost of the University of Virginia and president of the University of Pennsylvania
- Antonin Scalia (1967–1974) – later associate justice of the Supreme Court of the United States
- Frederick Schauer – constitutional law and theory, philosophy of law, freedom of expression
