= Civil Affairs Staging Area =

Civil Affairs Holding & Staging Area
- Active: July 15, 1944 to April 1, 1946
- Allegiance: United States
- Components: United States Army; United States Navy
- Role: Military government theater planning, training and provision of military government personnel to liberated areas of the: Pacific Ocean Areas; China Burma India Theater; South East Asia Command; South West Pacific Area
- Size: Brigade (4000+)
- Serviced by: 9th Service Command
- Garrisoned at: Presidio of Monterey
- Commanders: Brig. General Percy L. Sadler; Colonel Hardy C. Dillard; Colonel William A. Boekel

The Civil Affairs Staging Area (CASA) also known as the Civil Affairs Holding and Staging Area was a combined U.S. Army, U.S Navy military formation authorized by the Joint Chiefs of Staff on June 18, 1944, during World War Two for military government theater planning, training and provision of military government personnel to areas of the Far East liberated from the Empire of Japan, including East China, Formosa and Korea.

CASA had two divisions: The Operations and Training Division focused on language instruction and execution of civil affairs duties at a local level. These duties varied greatly and, as an example, included mass feeding of civilians, camp sanitation, provision of medical supplies, containment of epidemic diseases, labor relations and rodent control. The Theatre Planning & Research Division developed plans for military government at a national level such as control of Japan's economic institutions, control of Japan's education system and methods for increasing the overall supply of food throughout, not only Japan, but also previously occupied areas like East China.

CASA provided comprehensive training and planning in civil affairs administration to officers coming from six schools of military government established at various universities throughout the United States. Army and Navy personnel trained by CASA numbered in the thousands, with more than 1,000 officers assigned to a wide variety of civil affairs positions for the initial occupation of Japan alone. The goal of the U.S. Army's Civil Affairs Division in the creation of CASA was to replicate the same success in the Far East experienced by the Civil Affairs Division in the European Theatre.

General John H. Hilldring ordered Colonel Hardy C. Dillard, Commander of the Civil Affairs Training Division for the European Theater of Operations, to take command of CASA from Colonel William A. Boekel and implement the European Civil Affair's planning and training program. Colonel Dillard was relieved of command on 20 July 1945 by Brigadier General Percy L. Sadler.

== Background of Civil Affairs planning for the Far East ==
=== The China-Burma-India Theater ===
Shortly after the establishment of a Civil Affairs Division in the War Department in March 1943, a circular letter was sent to the commanding generals of all theaters offering the services of the Civil Affairs Division and of trained Civil Affairs officers. In response to a request from the Commanding General, United States Army Forces, China Burma India Theatre, Colonel William A. Boekel and Colonel (then Lt. Colonel) Mitchell Jenkins were ordered to New Delhi, where they arrived 4 May and 14 May respectively. Their first month was spent familiarizing themselves with the general situation in the countries of Southeast Asia. The American Civil Affairs officers received the distinct impression that the British officers regarded Burma and other British territory as definitely a British Civil Affairs area, with which the Americans should have no concern. As a result of policy conferences, this attitude was translated into a formal statement of basic policy, approved by American and British headquarters. Once established, this policy left American Civil Affairs officers no function except that of liaison with British agencie Colonel Boekel and Lt. Colonel Jenkins continued their studies of the countries of Southeast Asia, as well as the question of United States Civil Affairs activities in Japan proper, China, Korea and Manchukuo. Their work resulted in the formulation of certain tentative plans for the military government of Japan, and for the procurement, training and organization of Civil Affairs officers for the Far East. Their conclusions were embodied in a series of letters, of 26 August, 19 October, and 6 November 1943. The recommendations contained in these letters were approved by the Commanding General, China Burma India Theater, and transmitted by him to the War Department. In the preparation of the last two letters, assistance was given by Mr. John Davies, Political Adviser to Lieutenant General Joseph W. Stillwell, and by Mr. Monroe Kail, member of the American Mission in New Delhi. Both of these gentlemen concurred fully with the plans and recommendations contained in the letters.

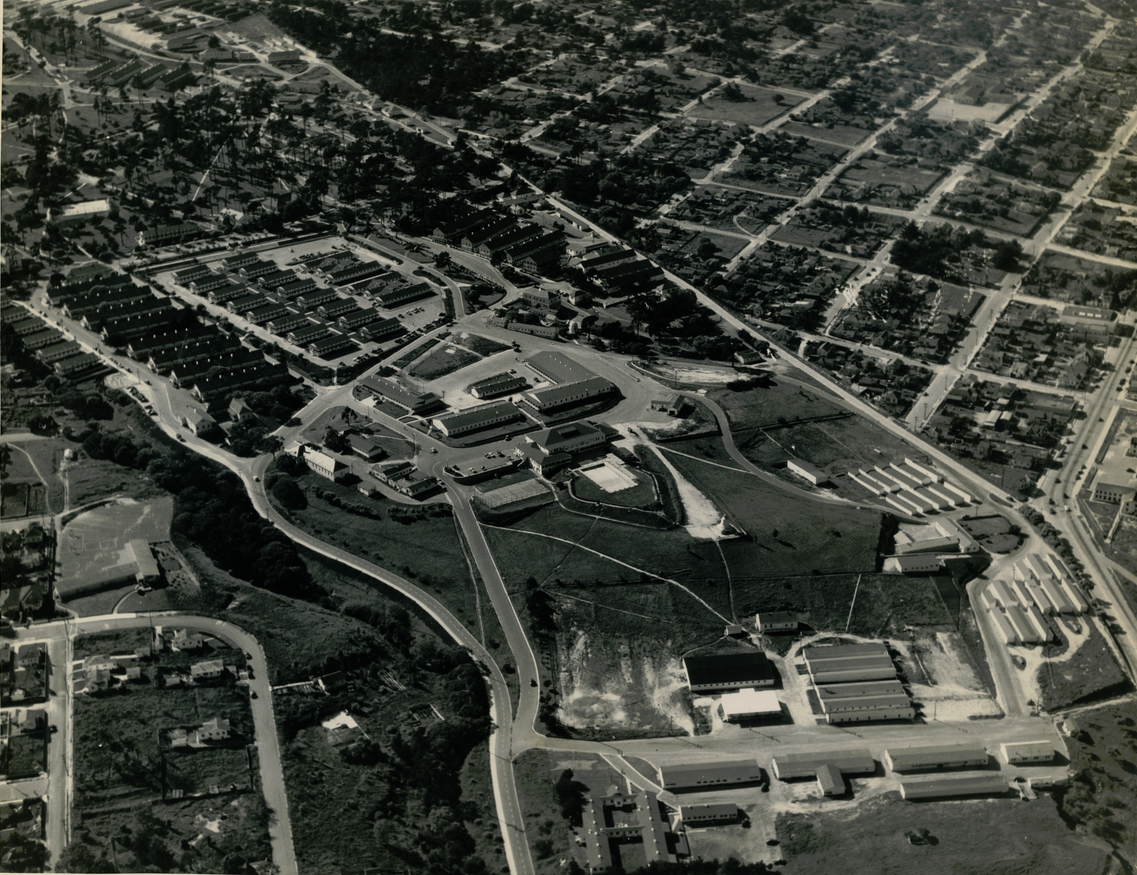
Aerial view of barracks occupied by soldiers and sailors of the Civil Affairs Staging Area (CASA) at the Presidio of Monterey during the Spring of 1945.

=== The Civil Affairs Division - War Department ===
Colonel Boekel was ordered, December 1943 to duty with the Civil affairs Division at Washington, although he was technically still assigned to Headquarters, USAF (United States Army Forces), CBI Theater. Upon reporting to Major General John H. Hilldring, Commander, Civil Affairs Division, Colonel Boekel was directed to assist the General in Civil Affairs planning and training for the Far East. The Civil Affairs Division directed its primary effort toward procuring a State Department, War Department (Operations Division); and Joint Chiefs of Staff declaration of policy with respect to United States Civil Affairs administration in the Far East. Such a statement was dependent, in large measure, upon certain long-range policy decisions within the State Department. General Hilldring wrote to the Chief, Naval Office for Occupied Areas, 25 January 1944: "It is anticipated that at an early date the State Department will issue written decisions of policy defining the current and postwar interests of the American Government in the above referred to areas. Upon receipt thereof, appropriate directives will be issued to the several military commanders in these areas... No definitive statement has thus far been made by the Army with reference to Korea and Manchukuo because the question as to whether or not there will be American participation in the administration of these areas is one which still awaits State Department determination."

The Civil Affairs Division's project, that of bringing together the various agencies involved in arriving at a joint decision, progressed satisfactorily. After four months in Washington, Colonel Boekel was able to report that "On 13 May 1944 J,C,S.. Paper 819/2 was issued by the J.C.S. approving certain basic assumptions for Civil Affairs planning purposes for specific areas in the Far East and Pacific Ocean. This Paper is substantially responsive to the inquiries and policy recommendations made by the Commanding General, USAF (United States Army Forces), China Burma India Theater in his letters to the War Department dated respectively 26 August, 19 October, and 8 November, 1943. The Paper as approved by the Joint Chiefs of Staff embodies the composite views of the Office of the Assistant Secretary of War, the State Department, the Civil Affairs Division (CAD) and of the U.S. Navy, and was 'sweated' through twenty-one drafts. General Hilldring regards the paper as of primary importance in that it gives initial direction and impetus to Civil Affairs "planning." In addition to policy planning, the Civil Affairs Division was concerned with plans for the procurement, training and organization of Civil Affairs officers for the Far East. As early as January 1944, it was reported to General Hilldring that, "the program is well under way for the training of 1500 officers for use in the operational and administrative functions." The Navy was invited to participate in the Army-training program as well as in the subsequent Civil Affairs administration of Japan to the extent of twenty-five per-cent of the personnel required. This invitation was confirmed later in papers of 10 December and 22 December 1943."

=== Initial planning at the School of Military Government ===
The procurement of fifteen hundred officers for Civil Affairs work in the Far East was provided for in War Department Circular No. 136, 8 April 1944. The first exclusively Far Eastern class at the School of Military Government, Charlottesville, Virginia, opened 12 June 1944 at the [University of Virginia]. While the Civil Affairs Division in Washington was busy coordinating the planning activities of the numerous agencies concerned with Civil Affairs, the School of Military Government in Charlottesville, VA was developing an informal Civil Affairs Planning Staff. Colonel Boekel wrote to General Ferris, 23 January 1944, that he would be in Charlottesville to interview 4 officers 'earmarked' for Asiatic Theater duty and to lay the foundation for the organization of the nucleus planning staff, which initially consisted of 4 Army and 3 Navy officers. A week later, Colonel Boekel wrote, that An embryonic planning section had been set up at the School of Military Government in Charlottesville, Virginia, consisting of five U.S. Army and three U.S. Navy officers and that Lt. Col Arthur Dobson was tentatively earmarked for General Albert Wedemeyer but was to be retained at the School of Military Government pending determination of the larger question of policy as to the extent of participation in SEAC (South East Asia Command). Colonel Boekel summarized personnel in the initial planning group as follows:

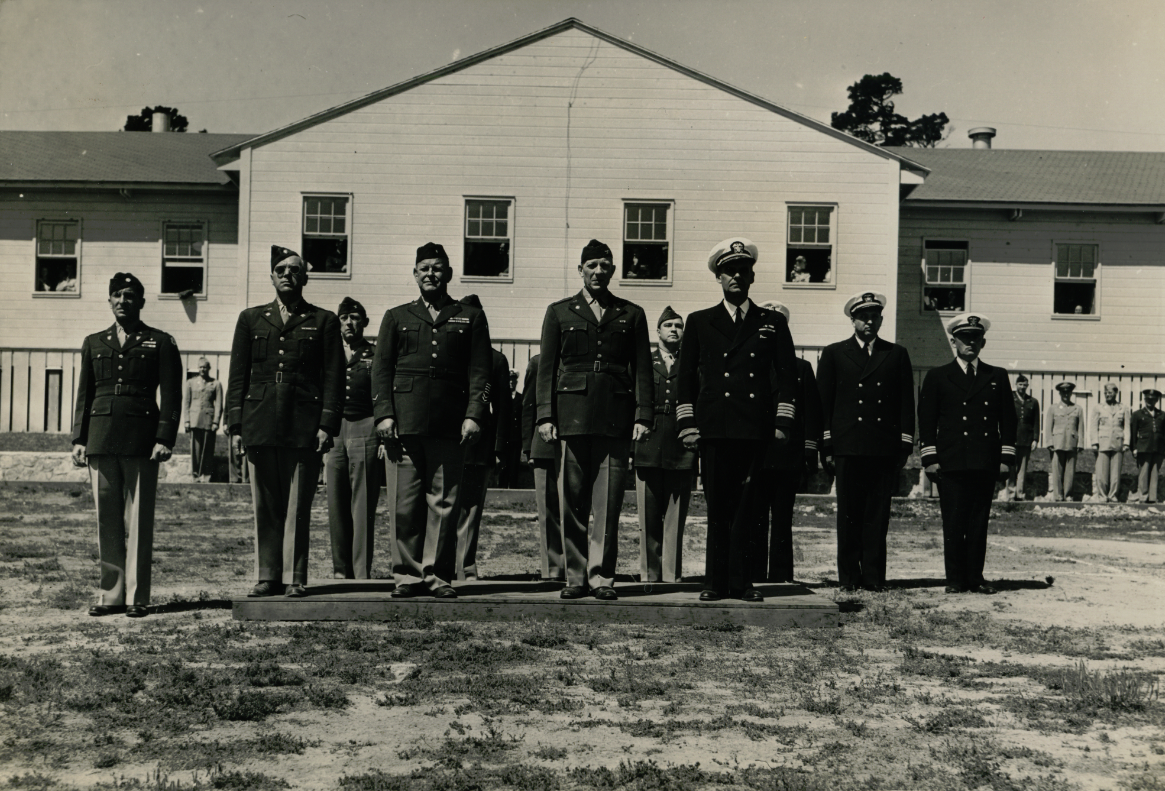
CASA Commander - Army Colonel Hardy C. Dillard (center) stands to the left of CASA Deputy Commander - Navy Captain William S. Veeder and alongside other senior Army / Navy officers. Under a Joint Chiefs of Staff directive, CASA was created as a combined Army / Navy formation with Army personnel comprising 75% of all personnel.

- Majors Faxon, Hudson and Dapert originally designated for assignment to the China Burma India Theater were held at the School of Military Government (SOMG) pending the determination of other policy questions.
- Major Isaacs was selected out of a group of 11 as an additional planner. Major Isaacs was born in Japan, speaks Japanese and is a successful San Francisco fisheries expert.
- Senior Surgeon - William W. Nesbitt.
- Lt. Comdr. Robert T. Secrest - a graduate of the Navy Military Government School and of the Wimbledon Military Government School.
- Lt. Warren S. Hunsberger - a learned and accomplished economist.

The planning section completed and maintained a current and basic Military Government plan for Japan Proper and its personnel were added to from time to time in the ratio of 75% Army and 25% Navy. According to Colonel Boekel in a letter to Colonel Jenkins dated 14 April 1944, the informal planning group at the SMG (School of Military Government) was, "involved in some very rough spade work in anticipation of what the several theater commanders or Navy Area Commanders may require to complete their planning when a directive is issued to them." Colonel Boekel noted that the theater commanders would not be bound by anything planned by the Far East initial planning group at the SMG (School of Military Government). The group, according to Colonel Boekel, served best as the focus for the procurement of survey data from the dozen or more federal agencies charged with the responsibility of getting out handbooks and guides for specific areas.

=== Planning for a Civil Affairs Holding and Staging Area ===
Planning for the establishment of a Civil Affairs Holding and Staging Area is first mentioned in a memorandum of Colonel Boekel's, written 15 January 1944, in preparation for a discussion with Colonel David Marcus, relative to planning for Civil affairs administration in the Far East. It was Colonel Boekel's opinion that, "As soon as the American (Army and Navy) officers and enlisted men personnel are trained, they should be organized into teams or provisional units with appropriate T/O's (tables of organization) and moved to Hawaii for final integration with the Theater Headquarters Planning Staff. The facilities of the University of Hawaii may be available. There the personnel should be broken up into teams for special areas and be ready to take over any thereof as the military situation requires. If there is to be British participation, the amalgamation thereof with the Americans should take place in Hawaii or the final Theater School and Staging Area. The Asiatic Theater Commander has already stated that for logistical and other reasons, the staff could not be trained in India and introduced into Japan via the Himalayan hump; nor over the Burma Road." In furtherance of the plan to establish the Holding and Staging Area in Hawaii, Colonel Boekel conferred with Captain Mercer- Secretary to Admiral Nimitz, 10 March 1944.

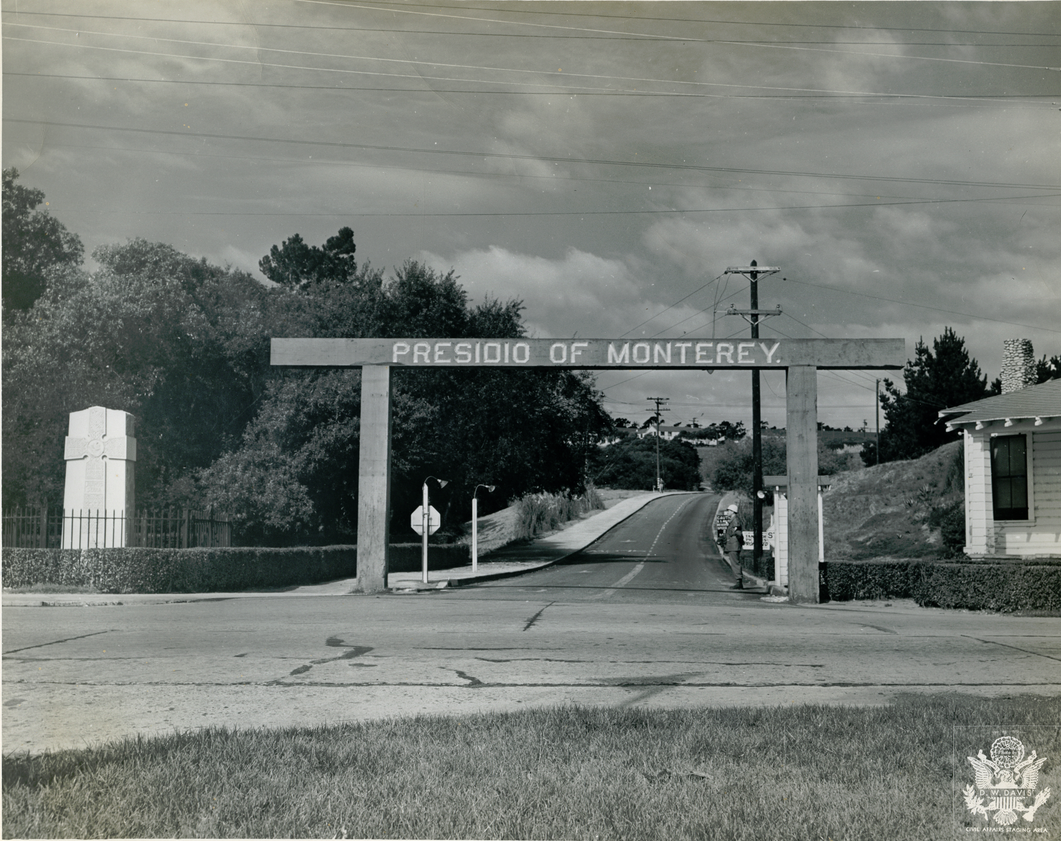
A sentry stands at the main gate to the Presidio of Monterey in the spring of 1945. The Presidio of Monterey was reactivated in January 1945 to accommodate the Civil Affairs Staging Area.

Captain Mercer stated that the Navy would be opposed to the immediate reception and quartering of any large number of Civil Affairs officers in Hawaii, because of the paucity of shipping space, subsistence and quarters. He indicated, however, that the Navy would give a sympathetic reception to the 'survey' committee which is to go to Hawaii from Civil Affairs Division and Captain Pence's office, particularly if the proposal is based upon a progressive transfer starting with a small number on or about 1 June and continuing through the ensuing period of CATS (Civil Affairs Training Schools). Colonel Boekel also reported that during the previous week he had a conference with Captain Moore of Lt. General Richardson's staff. Captain Moore indicated that there would be no difficulty in transferring the Planning Section and successive increments of CATS (Civil Affairs Training Schools) to Hawaii. Colonel Boekel went to Hawaii in May 1944 to confer directly with Admiral Chester W. Nimitz, Commander of the Pacific Fleet and Pacific Ocean Areas, and with Lt. General Richardson, Commanding General, United States Army Forces, Central Pacific Area concerning the site of the Holding and Staging Area about to be established. The decision arrived at as a result of this conference was that it would be impractical to locate the Holding and Staging Area in Hawaii. The search for a site was then transferred to the west coast of continental United States. A committee from Washington, composed of Colonel Boekel, Colonel Harry Jones, Chief of the Personnel and Training Branch, Civil affairs Division, and Colonel H. E. Robison, of the Provost Marshal General's Office, visited several potential sites in California. They inspected Camp McQuaide at Santa Cruz; the Presidio of San Francisco; Camp Beale, at Sacramento; and Fort Ord, at Monterey. Their choice fell upon the last named site. The formal establishment of the holding and staging area is referred to in a Joint Chiefs of Staff document.

"Planning Assumptions for U.S. Civil affairs in Pacific Ocean Areas, SWPAC, CBI and SEA, 30 June 1944. By War Department directives dated 18 and 29 June 1944 a Civil Affairs Holding and Staging Area (CASA) has been established at Fort Ord, California effective as of 15 July 1944 as a special activity under the Director, Civil Affairs Division, War Department Special Staff, to be administered by the Ninth Service Command. At CASA the officer graduates of the School of Military Government (SMG) and Civil Affairs Training School (CATS) will be processed for overseas service in the Far East and will be given special area indoctrination and orientation. It is anticipated that CinCPOA (Commander in Chief Pacific Ocean Areas) and the CG (Commanding General), Central Pacific Command will furnish liaison officers to CASA in order to assure that the operation of CASA will be consistent with the requirements of CinCPOA and CPA (Commander Pacific Area).

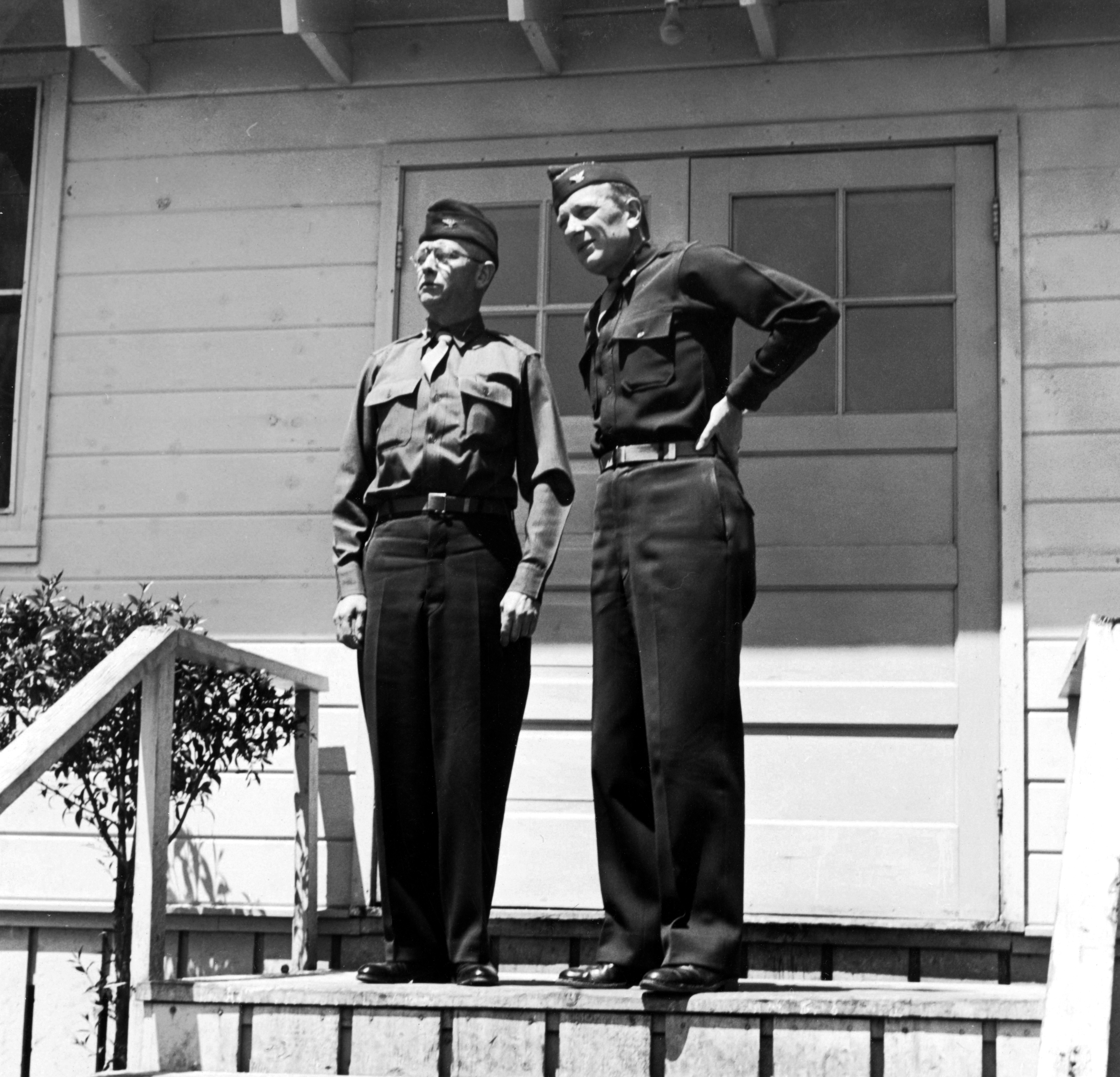
Civil Affairs Staging Area (CASA) Commander - Colonel Hardy C. Dillard (right) and CASA Executive Officer - Colonel Mitchell Jenkins.

=== Establishment of CASA at Fort Ord ===
At the time of the arrival of the advance party at Fort Ord, 15 July 1944, there was still some uncertainty as to which buildings would be assigned to CASA. After an inspection of the available buildings in the 17AC area, as well as other available troop quarters, a message was sent to the Ninth Service Command at Fort Douglas, and confirmation received, of the assignment to CASA of the WAC (Warfare Area Commander) area. This consisted of the administration building, a mess hall and three barracks. One additional building was still occupied by WAC personnel. The space assigned as regarded as adequate for the initial group of about one hundred officers and twenty-eight enlisted men on a single-cot basis, and provided, in addition a room for assembly, research and conference purposes. The Civil Affairs Staging Area, Fort Ord, California, was activated 15 July 1944, by CASA General Order No 1, which also announced Colonel Boekel's assumption of command as Acting Commanding Officer.

==== CASA advanced party ====
The immediate task of the advance party, in preparation for the arrival of the first contingent, 1 August, was that of cleaning and equipping the assigned buildings. In order to fit the physical facilities for efficient use, there was also considerable minor carpentry, plumbing, signal and engineering work to be done, as well as Quartermaster and Commissary supplies to be drawn. As a result of strenuous work by the members of the advance party, carried out over long hours, the physical task of moving in was completed by Saturday evening, 22 July 1944. On the following Monday morning, a field ration mess was opened.

=== Movement of CASA to Presidio of Monterey ===
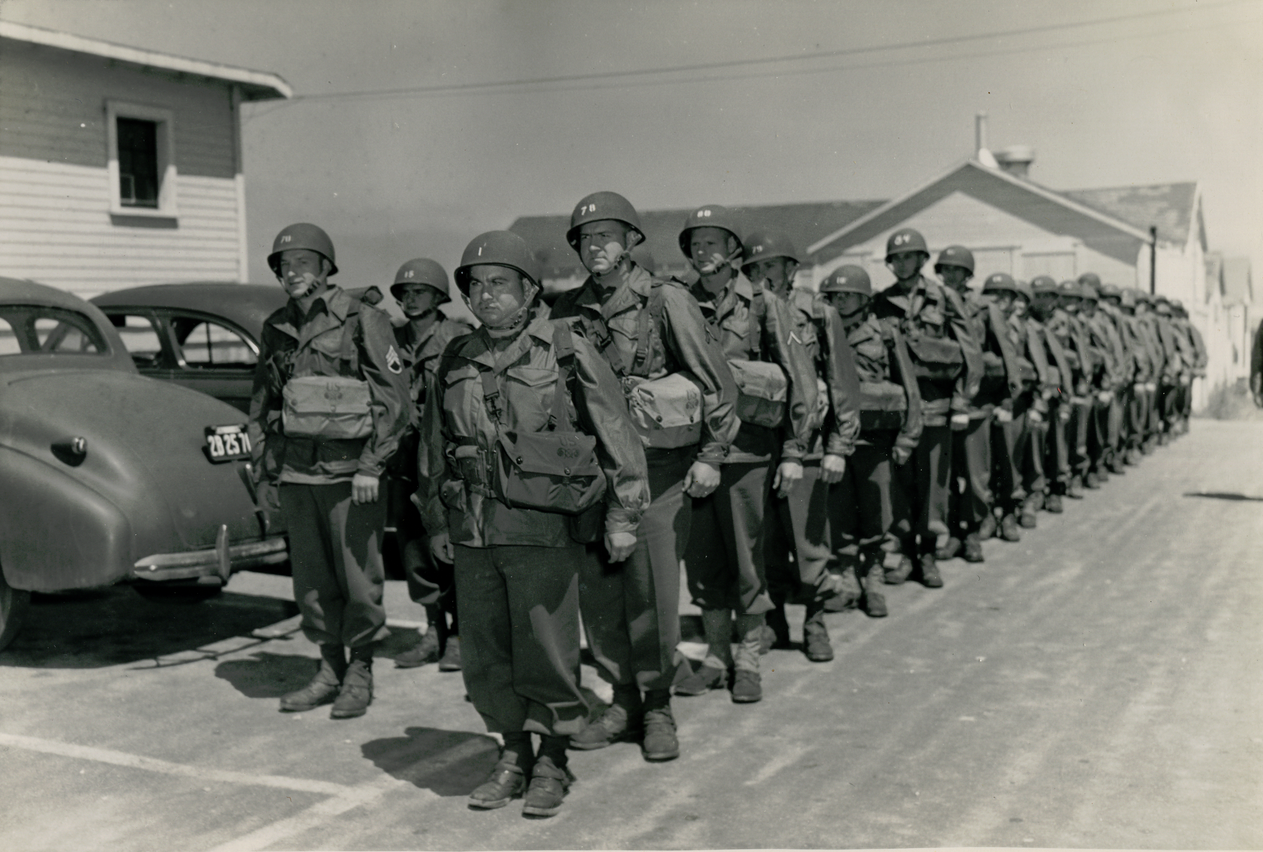
Civil Affairs Staging Area (CASA) soldiers at the Presidio of Monterey march to the field in Spring of 1945.

CASA personnel strength showed little growth from the time of activation of Civil affairs Holding and Staging, Area to the end of the year, five months later. The arrival of eight hundred seventy-six (876) Navy enlisted men, plus additional Army and Navy officers, during the last days of the calendar year brought the total strength to one thousand one hundred twenty-four (1,124). Considerable additional growth was presaged by the increasing numbers of Army and Navy officers in Civil Affairs Training Schools at six universities. This rapid increase of CASA personnel had already put considerable pressure on the physical facilities assigned to CASA by the Ninth Service Command. As early as September 1944, Commander Dillard wrote, that "It is important that we immediately freeze space either here or at the Presidio of San Francisco in anticipation of future needs" Continuing studies of space needs occupied the attention of the command staff. Colonel Jenkins, the Executive Officer, reported to the Commanding Officer, 14 November 1944, as follows, "On the basis that- we may not be able to have The Presidio at Monterrey and must stay here, I have again made a survey of East Garrison of Fort Ord. Just in case we cannot get additional space in the Main Garrison beyond what has now been allocated to us and CAD (Civil Affairs Division) insists that we must care for more than 1200 bodies, which as I wrote you is the maximum that our present space can accommodate. Under these circumstances, East Garrison would be our only alternative. It will take care of us, but I hope we will not have to go there." Colonel Harry P. Jones, Chief of Personnel and Training Branch, CAD (Civil Affairs Division), replied to the above memorandum that the original authority to locate at Fort Ord provided for freezing space for 1625 men and officers. He added that a new request was being submitted, increasing the number to be provided for up to 3000, and including a paragraph to the effect that if Fort Ord, Main Garrison is not available, the Presidio of Monterey would be made available. The Commanding Officer stated, in response to Colonel Jones' letter, that, "There has never been any question of lack of accommodations at Fort Ord. The only question is, where in Fort Ord. Ground Forces are freezing, from Washington a steadily increasing amount of space in Main Garrison. Every indication pointed to a growing monopoly which, unchecked; would have split us between Main Garrison and East Garrison or even pushed us over to East Garrison." The Civil Affairs Division, War Department, then recommended that a survey be made of the facilities of Camp Beale in order to compare them with those of East Garrison. In the memorandum reporting this comparison the Commanding Officer expressed his judgment that, "East Garrison, while less desirable than Main Garrison or the Presidio of Monterey, is much more desirable in every respect than Camp Beale." He stated also that Colonel Jenkins, Executive Officer, and Major Dickey, Chief of POR Branch of S-3, concurred with him in this judgment. Colonel Dillard maintained that, "It would be impossible to secure a better location for CASA than the Presidio of Monterrey."The primary obstacle to be overcome in securing the Presidio of Monterey for CASA was the fact that this permanent installation had been inactivated. The War Department was experiencing considerable pressure to inactivate more installations, as the result of large scale shipments of personnel to overseas duty. To reactivate the Presidio of Monterrey was indeed a difficult task. The difficulties were eventually overcome, however, and Colonel Dillard was able to write on, 24 January 1945 that, "Upon my return from a trip to San Francisco and Shoemaker I learned the welcome news that the Presidio of Monterrey had been procured for us." War Department Circular No. 4-0, dated 1 February 1945, and General Order No 12 Headquarters, Ninth Service Command, 10 formally placed the Presidio of Monterey in active status, effective 18 January 1945 and established the Civil Affairs Holding and Staging area as an activity of the Presidio, effective 10 February 1945.

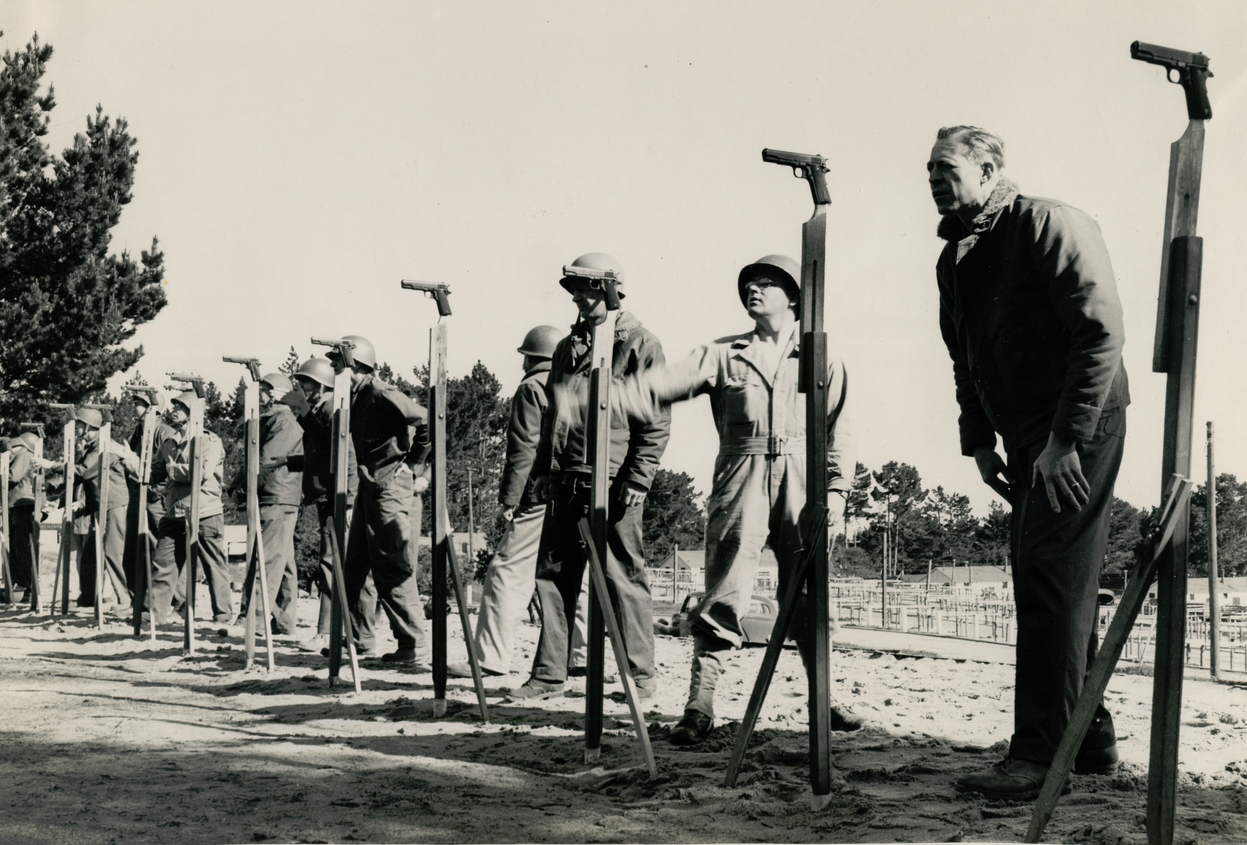
Civil Affairs Staging Area (CASA) Commander - Colonel Hardy C. Dillard, alongside other civil affairs soldiers, looks down range after engaging targets with the M1911 pistol.

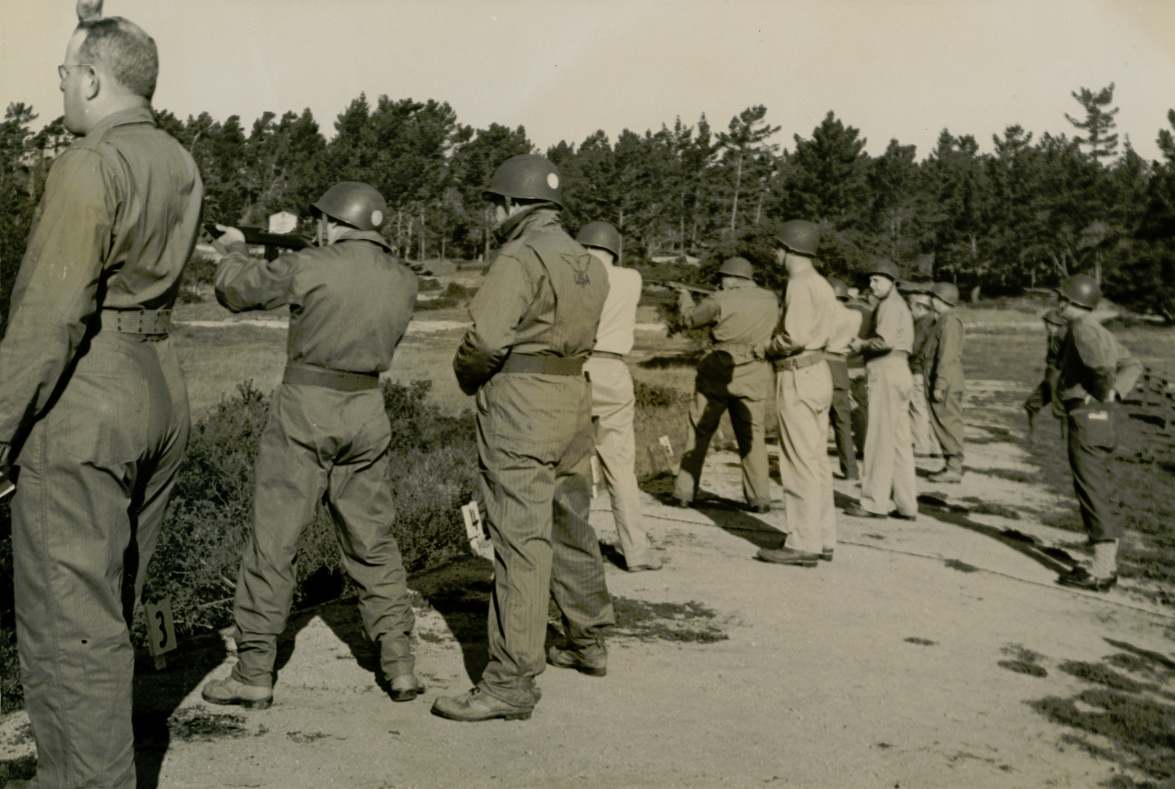
CASA soldiers train with the M1 carbine.

== Operations and Training Division ==
=== Physical Processing and Training Branch ===
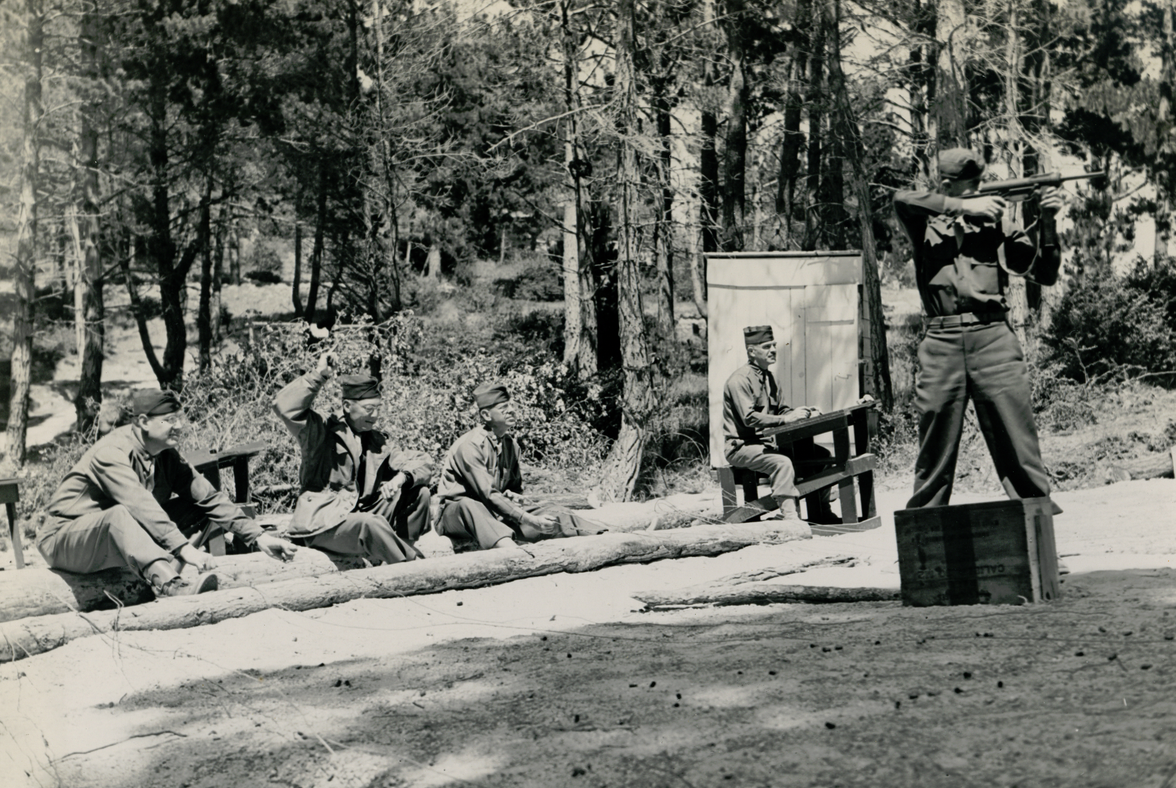
CASA soldiers train with the M3A1 submachine gun.

The organization and functions of the Physical Processing and Training Branch of the Operations Division (S3) included:

- Training Group A
  1. Instruction in small arms
  2. Conduct of ranges
- Training Group B
  1. Field Training in subjects such as booby traps, land mines, camouflage, hand grenades, infiltration, slit trench, fox hole preparation, landing net, amphibious operations, chemical warfare, use of field equipment, tent pitching, hikes and assistance in the conduct of bivouacs.
- Training Group C
  1. Physical conditioning, construction and maintenance of facilities, demonstrations and classes in Judo and general hand-to-hand combat.
- Training Group D
  1. First echelon maintenance and operation of motor vehicles (classes), and conduct of examinations for motor vehicle operators' permits.

The advance party devoted most of its time during the second week at CASA to planning the details of the training program which began immediately.

=== Unit Training Branch ===
The mission of the Unit Training Branch was to train military government units for the successful completion of any Military Government mission in the field, or for any specific Military Government mission assigned by a Theater Commander.

==== Planning Section ====
The planning section included plans on courses, field problems, panels, demonstrations; estimates of supply and transport needed to execute plans and the supervision of execution needed to complete the plans. The planning section also included the provision of administrative assistants to execute unit training programs as assigned, to revise programs in the light of operation experience, to complete staff work submitted by the Problem Planning Section, to submit original oral or written memoranda for the unit training problems and programs, to undertake the planning and execution of special programs required by higher authority on short notice and to check all Field and Military Government problems with provision headquarters and appropriate functional specialists.

==== Civilian camp layout ====
A full size civilian camp for displaced persons, occupying approximately ten acres was staked out and outlined in white tape on the Presidio of Monterrey. The camp layout was based on a recommended plan submitted to the Headquarters from the Theater.....Barbed wire fences, sanitary facilities and typical sections of barracks and other buildings were constructed in the area - with detachments participating in the construction. It was anticipated that the camp would make field problems relating to camps take on a more realistic aspect in addition to the training aid, which the actual layout would provide.

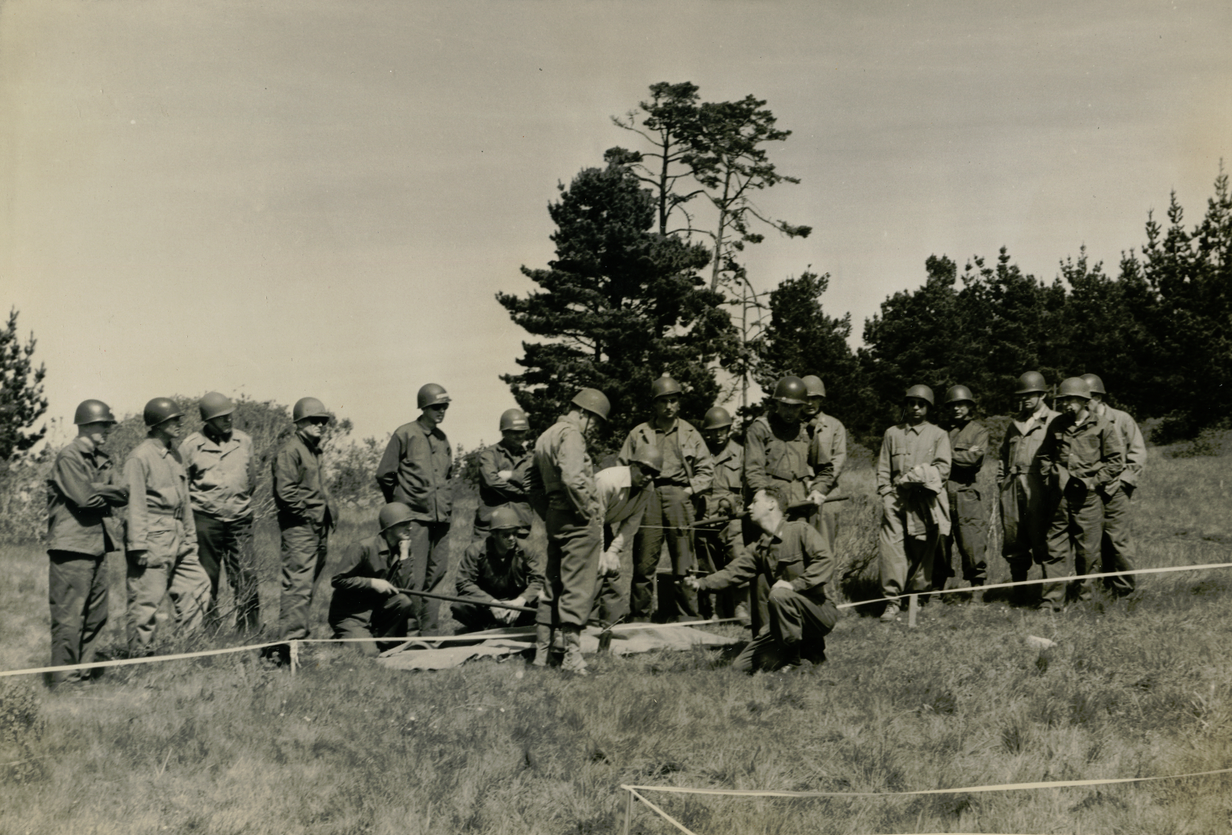
CASA soldiers, using white tape, outline a camp for displaced civilians. The camp was ten acres in size.

==== Civilian camp layout models ====
During the summer of 1945, several paper and plaster models of hilly terrain were provided, also small models of buildings, sanitary facilities, water tanks, etc. Training groups were then given the opportunity to set up a model civilian camp. Each of these camp layouts was photographed, as the basis for a team contest to see which group could set up the best camp. Considerable interest was aroused by this realistic approach to a practical problem.

=== Information and Indoctrination Branch ===
The mission of the Information and Indoctrination Branch was to disseminate general information which would be useful to Military Government officers in the field, provide speakers with Far Eastern experience instructional films, the organization of educational panels, to secure education pamphlets and similar materials, prepare and supervise a weekly "convocation" or assembly, to procure and project film for all divisions of CASA, and to install and operate a public address system for all divisions.

=== Language Branch ===
Language work was initially included in the Interior Training Section of the Planning, Processing and Training Branch, Functional Division, with Major Wilbur L. Williams, CMP, as Section Chief. There were two language supervisors, 1st Lt Harold K. Brown, INF, and 1st Lt Suyeki Okumura, INF. Instruction was carried on initially by five enlisted instructors of Japanese ancestry, S/Sgt Hironobu Hino, T/4 Randolph K. Inoue, T/4 Clarence M. Kimura, S/Sgt Masaru Nakagawa, and S/Sgt Paul J. Sakai, The Divisional reorganization at CASA of 22 November 1944 set up a separate Language Section, with Major Myron I. Barker, AUS, as Chief of Section, and 1st Lt. Suyeki Okumura, INF, as Assistant Chief. Two additional Japanese language informants arrived at the end of December, and fifteen more arrived 5 January 1945, bringing the total to twenty-two. In February, eleven Navy officers were assigned to the Language Section for duty. They constituted a research and production unit. Each officer was given a definite project, and attached to him was a group of informants who worked closely with him. Two more informants were added to the group in March. By 20 July, the end of the first year of CASA, the total number of informants stood at thirty-nine. The number of classes in Japanese language was slightly more than fifty, and the number of classes in the Chinese language was fourteen. At the end of the first month of Japanese language instruction, the officers in charge of the program, 1st Lt Harold K. Brown, INF, and 1st Lt. Suyeki Okumura, INF, made a report to the Commanding Officer. They mentioned certain problems which had become apparent during the course of the month. For one thing, the instructors had not received any teaching materials from Military Intelligence School, Camp Savage, Minnesota, from which all of them had come. For reasons of security, they had been asked to turn in all their language materials before they left, but were promised that materials would be shipped as soon as requested by proper authority. Request had been made, but no materials had arrived. Another problem was created by the different systems of spelling used, (Hepburn and Block-Kennedy) some of the officers having been trained in one system and some in the other. This difficulty was met by mimeographing all teaching materials in both systems. One paragraph of this report is of special interest.

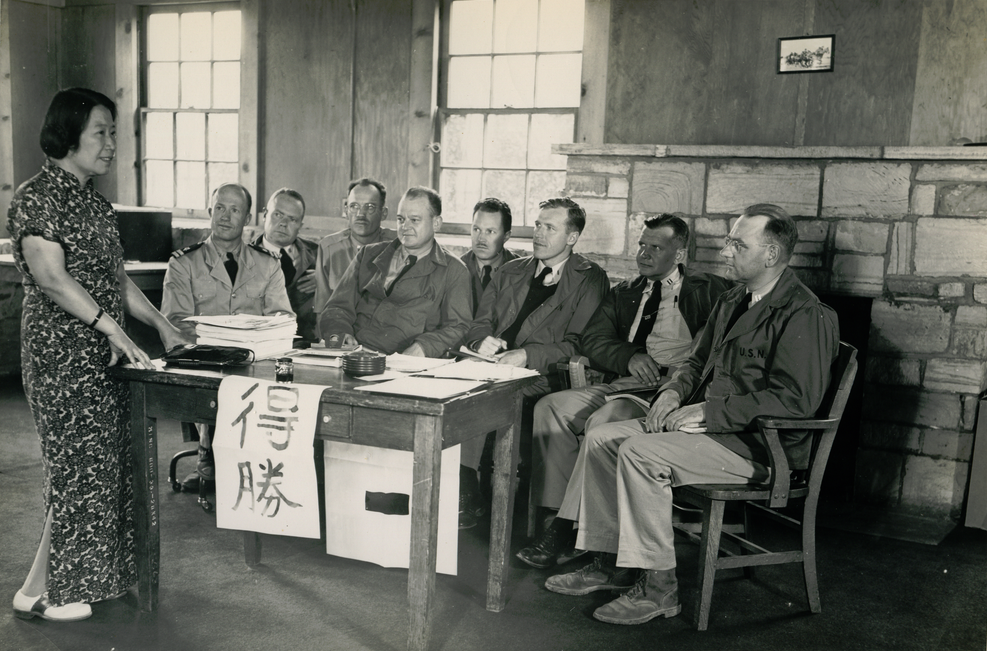
Madam Ling - fu Yang, formerly curator of the National Museum-Peking, gives CASA officers Chinese language instruction.

"In comparing the enlisted instructors at CASA. to the civilian instructors at the Civil Affairs Training Schools, it is felt that the enlisted men are more desirable, during this phase of the officers' training, in view of the fact that they are able to present, as a result of their training, a much more military aspect of the language. This, too, tends to make the language training more realistic."

A difficult situation was created by the wide variation in language experience and previous training of the officers at CASA, The report mentioned above, points out that there were four distinct groups, for each of which a distinct type of language work had to be provided. These groups were:

==== University of Chicago - Class 1 ====
Approximately three months of training which was presented differently from the training given to Class II at the same school. In addition to this difference in training, these officers had served in the field for three months, immediately prior to assignment at CASA, during which time, the majority had lost all contact with the language. Some instruction had been received in reading and writing.

==== University of Chicago - Class 2 ====
Seven and one-half months of training in the language, with no loss of contact prior to assignment at CASA. Elementary training in reading and writing and use of the dictionary.

==== University of Virginia Group ====
Approximately three months of training at the School of Military Government at the University of Virginia. During this training, Naganuma's Standard Reader was used as a text, and the officers were learning to read and write simultaneously while learning to speak the language.

==== Beginners Group ====
Officers with no previous training in the language, and Navy officers who had received very little training at the Navy School at Columbia University.

==== Observations by Commander Boekel ====
An interesting and significant observation of the language experience of the officers was made by the Acting Commanding Officer, Colonel Boekel, in his weekly report to the Commander, Civil Affairs Division (CAD), dated 25 August 1944. He wrote, "I have made it a practice, whenever possible, to audit the language refresher conferences being conducted here under the supervision of the five language sergeants. I derived the very clear impression that the practical vocabularies of the CASA Officers and their ability to weave the spoken words into a simple sentence structure were woefully inadequate. I gained the impression too that the vocabulary thus far achieved had to do principally with the ordinary amenities of gracious living and that no special effort had been made thus far to teach Civil Affairs officers a vocabulary and language structure which would enable them to make practical applications thereof in simple Civil Affairs tasks. Motivated by the foregoing impressions, we prepared a questionnaire. Today one hour was devoted to the procurement of ninety-one (91) CASA officers' self-evaluation of their Area E linguistic ability. In addition, the five sergeant language instructors were directed to regard themselves as the average CASA linguist and, without consultation with each other, to furnish a rating of the average CASA officer in the same questionnaire...the more significant facts brought out in the questionnaire. The officers in rating themselves claimed a vocabulary which averaged 704 words, and asserted their ability to use 208 words fluently, 275 words fairly well and 192 with difficulty. The Japanese sergeant instructors, in rating the average CASA. officers, gave them credit for the retention of a 204 word vocabulary of which they could use 97 fluently, 70 fairly well, and 82 with difficulty. The answers to interrogatory 4 in the questionnaire (i.e., the Civil Affairs problem) indicate that 71% of the officers consider that they are not sufficiently qualified in the use of the language to accomplish the Civil Affairs mission therein stated. If of this percentage figure there is added the qualified "yes" answers, then only seven (7) officers or approximately 8% themselves equal to the questionnaire language task and 92% are unqualified. Four of the sergeant instructors stated emphatically and one of them qualified that the average CASA officer would not be able to handle the language part of the Civil Affairs mission in question. The instructors had been working with these officers for only two weeks and therefore their basis for judgment was perhaps not sufficient. As to the method of instruction at CATS (Civil Affairs Training Schools), the preponderant opinion seems to be that more emphasis should be placed on conversation and drill in the actual vocabulary required for the accomplishment of the Civil Affairs mission." Perhaps in part as a result of this investigation, vocabularies and drill materials developed at CASA did emphasize the use of Civil Affairs situations, and were therefore realistic and practical. A large amount of such material was developed at CASA.

Language work was initially included in the Interior Training Section of the Planning, Processing and Training Branch, Functional Division, with Major Wilbur L. Williams, CMP, as Section Chief. There were two language supervisors, 1st Lt Harold K. Brown, INF, and 1st Lt Suyeki Okumura, INF. Instruction was carried on initially by five enlisted instructors of Japanese ancestry, S/Sgt Hironobu Hino, T/4 Randolph K. Ideue, T/4 Clarence M. Kimura, S/Sgt Masaru Nakagawa, and S/Sgt Paul J. Sakai, The Divisional reorganization of 22 November 1944 set up separate Language Section, with Major Myron I. Barker, AUS, as Chief of Section, and 1st Lt Suyeki Okumura, INF, as Assistant Chief. Two additional Japanese language informants arrived at the end of December, and fifteen more arrived 5 January 1945, bringing the total to twenty-two. In February, eleven Navy officers were assigned to the Language Section for duty. They constituted a research and production unit. Each officer was given a definite project, and attached to him was a group of informants who worked closely with him. Two more informants were added to the group in March. 3. By 20 July, the end of the first year of CASA, the total number of informants stood at thirty-nine, the number of classes in Japanese language; was slightly more than fifty, and the number of classes in the Chinese language was fourteen.

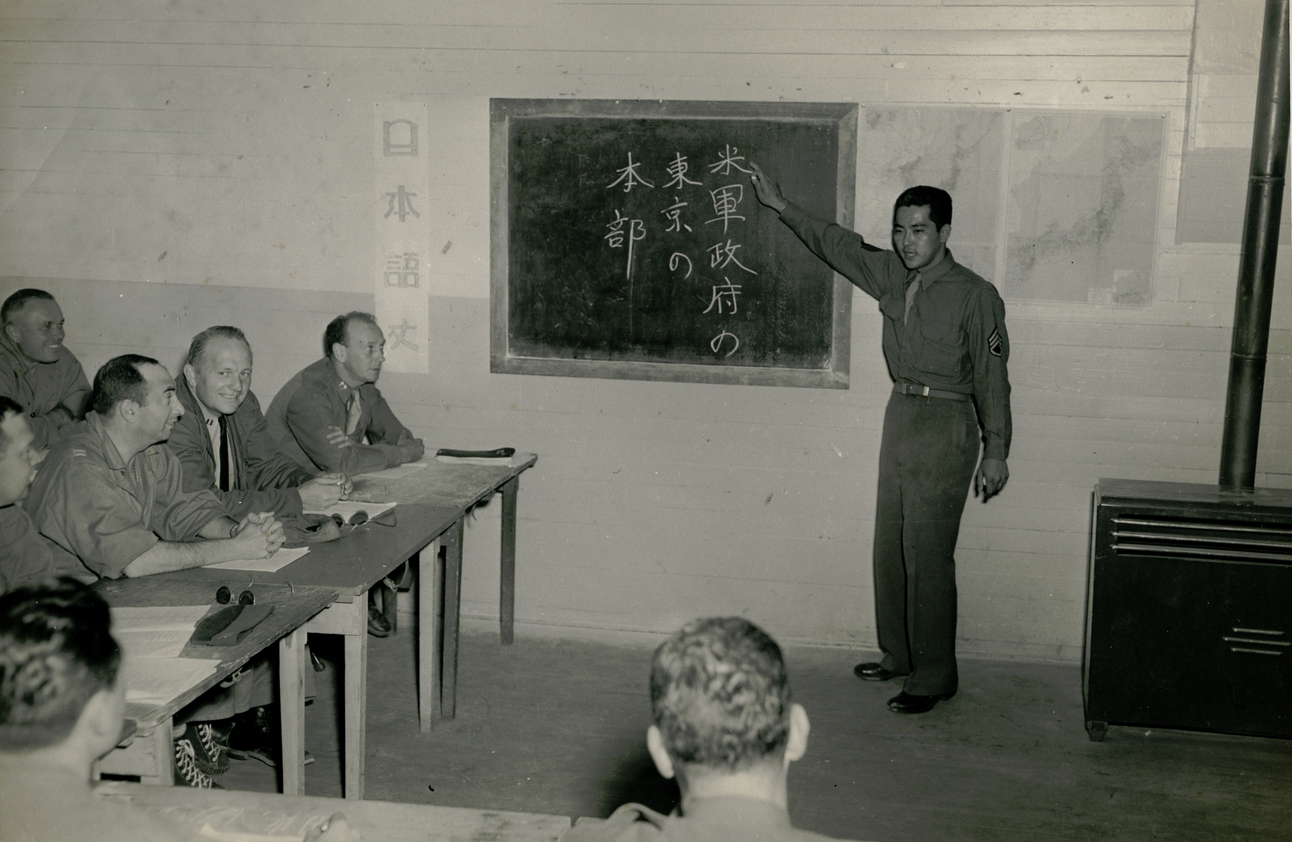
CASA officers receive Japanese instruction from a language sergeant.

The Language Branch rendered service to other CASA activities by providing translators, chosen from its staff of Nisei informants, insofar as this could be done without interfering with the instructional program. These translators were of special value to the CASA Outpost of the Office of Strategic Services, and to the research Group of S-5 in connection with the writing of Military Government handbooks and manuals.

==== Japanese language instruction ====
The officers studying Japanese were organized into small groups, and met with the Japanese-American enlisted instructors two hours each day, five days a week. Relatively little emphasis was placed on reading and writing the Japanese language. The primary concern was to develop facility in the use of the spoken language. Much attention was given to the development of mimeographed language materials (dialogues, conversations, etc.) dealing specifically with Military Government situations.

==== Chinese language instruction ====
The classes in Chinese language were developed primarily because of the possibility that CASA might be called upon to, send Civil Affairs officers to the Theater for use in Formosa or on the China coast. A few officers who had some experience in the use of spoken Chinese (Mandarin) were called upon to serve as instructors. Madame Ling-fu Yang, formerly curator of the National Museum, Peking became an instructor in this department, and conducted additional classes for the CASA officers who were acting as instructors.

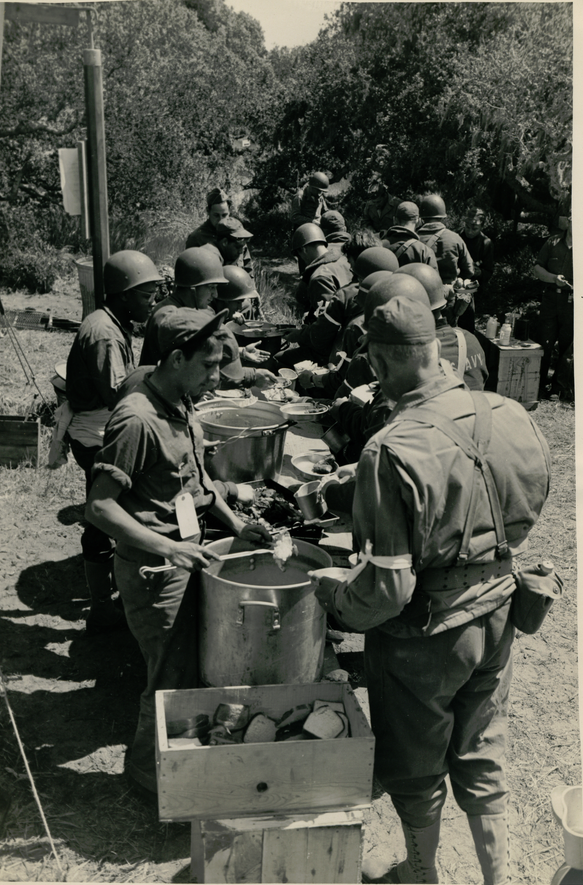
CASA soldiers enjoy a meal prepared by the mess section.

=== Instruction Branch (Functional Training) ===
Functional training was concerned with the preparation of officers for the many specialized functions performed by Civil Affairs/Military Government. Training of this nature was carried on from the beginning. At first, however, it was so closely integrated with Theater Survey and Planning that no separate branch or section was established for it. When an S-5 Division was created, in December 1944, functional training was declared to be the primary mission of the new division. It was not until 3 March 1945 that functional training was transferred to the S-3 or "Training" Division. Special Order No 38, 6 March, assigned personnel to the "Functional Training Branch" of the S-3 Division. The name of the Branch was changed, 10 April, to 'Instruction Branch" at the same time that its responsibilities were expanded.

==== General Administration Section ====
Officers in the General Administration Section studied the governments of the area at the national, prefecture, city, village and township levels.

==== Public Safety Section ====
Students in the Public Safety Section concentrated on the public safety operations of the area including: police, fire and civilian defense. Arrangements were made with the Chief of Police, San Francisco, and with the Warden of San Quentin Prison, to send groups of CASA Public Safety Officers to the San Francisco Bay area for training in their specialty.

==== Legal and Property Control Section ====
Officers in the Legal and Property Control Section studied the laws and machinery for the administration of justice in the area and in addition, property control.

==== Agricultural, Fishing Section ====
Curriculum consisted of a course in Oriental Agriculture, given at the University of California College of Agriculture at Davis. and courses of instruction in Japanese agriculture at CASA. Field trips were taken to Biggs, California, to study USDA Rice Experiment Station; to Sacramento, California, to inspect the Bercut-Richards Canning Factory, which packed fruit for the Armed Forces and the F.H. Woodruff & sons Seed Company plant, packaging vegetable seeds for foreign shipment; to the Delta Area of California, south of Sacramento, to study fruit and vegetable production and the handling of Japanese labor; and to the California Agricultural. Exp. Station Orchard in Winters, California, where subtropical fruits were observed and studied on the tree. Stops were made at Vacaville to inspect the Basic Products Company, onion dehydrating plant; and at Berkeley, to study hydroponics (water culture of plants) in the U.S. Army Air Forces Laboratory.

==== Economics and Labor Section ====
Officers in the Economics and Labor Section studied economics in its different ramifications including agriculture, fisheries, communications, public works and utilities, transportation, industry and resources, and labor relations.

==== Fiscal Section ====
Training curriculum included mechanisms of banking, public finance and currency control involved in the liberated area.

==== Engineering Section ====
Training Curriculum included coursework in public works, transportation, utilities and communications. Additional training was conducted at Camp Parks, California, Navy Construction Battalion station. Arrangements were made through the Military Government Liaison Officer, Twelfth Naval District, San Francisco. First contingent of officers reported to Camp Parks 4 March 1945. Subject matter included: Seabee administration, history and advanced base policy. Functional components included: cargo stowage; mosquito control; camp sanitation - including drainage; water purification; refrigeration equipment and native materials. These subjects were presented by class lectures, motion pictures and field demonstrations.

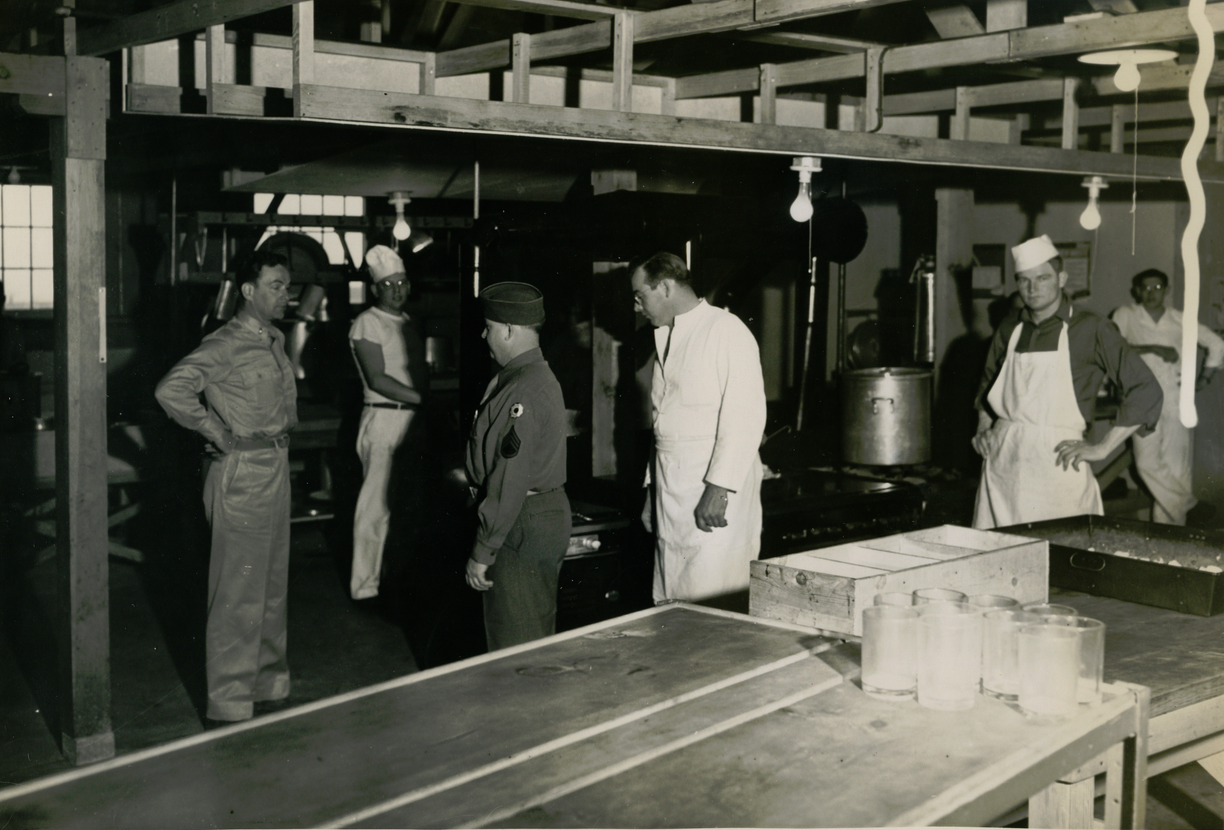
A CASA officer addresses a sergeant during training for mess supervisors.

==== Mess Supervisors Section ====
The coursework for Mess Supervisors covered several areas that had an immediate impact on civilian sustenance:

- Civilian Camp Feeding: Civilian camp feeding instruction included: improvisation of field cooking facilities, preparation of Oriental foods and dishes of minimum subsistence diet, sanitation, food handling, food distribution, control and storage of food. Preparation of dehydrated foods.
- Mass Feedings: Organization, administration and supervision of civilian mass feedings. Organization, administration and supervision of officers and enlisted men's mess. Inventory, control and requisition. Food preparation.
- Civilian Welfare: Organization and delivery of essential civilian commodities.
- Related Functions: Camp maintenance. General sanitary policies. Organization of civilian groups for feeding and other purposes. Improvising of shelter.
- Related Training:
  1. A six-day course at the School for Bakers and Cooks, covering preparation of dehydrated foods, improvising of field facilities, field sanitation, minimum subsistence diet and food storage.
  2. Instruction by officers -in-charge of CASA messing included study of mess hall operations, analysis of personnel functions, planning of menus and preparation of food.
  3. Field trips and exercises including: improvising of facilities and actual direction of enlisted personnel in preparation of a camp diet.
  4. Meetings with various staff members acquainted with camp operation and oriental feeding habits.

==== Sanitary Section ====
A training section in Sanitation, under the Surgeon, was originated in early January 1945, when Capt. W.D. Sheets, reported for duty. Water-treating equipment and other sanitary equipment and supplies were immediately ordered. During January the Sanitary Demonstration area, lectures and training films were utilized in the training program, since no other training aids were available. With the removal of CASA to the Presidio, early in February, use of the Fort Ord Sanitary Demonstration Area was eliminated. By the latter part of February, three other Sanitary Officers had reported for duty, Majors Milton O Lee and Howard E. Dorst, and Capt. W.R. Bradlee. The training program was then organized with four hours of instruction in water sanitation (Capt. Sheets), two hours in waste disposal (Capt. Bradlee), four hours in food sanitation (Maj. Lee), four hours in insect and rodent control (Maj. Dorst), and four hours in field sanitation by all of the above officers. Major Dorst, the senior officer, was designated Chief of Section, and Capt. Sheets continued as property officer. As more training equipment was received, floor space available in the Dispensary became inadequate and the Sanitary Training Section was moved to larger quarters in Building 5.

===== Sanitary Demonstration Area =====
A new Sanitary Demonstration Area was constructed at the Presidio of Monterey, at first by officer trainees, and later be enlisted men and prisoners of war. This area contained about forty appliances, and was completely constructed from salvage material, except for cement, with about 1500 man hours of labor. A practice construction area ordered the permanent installations. During training a number of these appliances were in operation. To inaugurate the Area, all of the Headquarters Staff was conducted on a tour in late May. Food was prepared on the field ranges and the noon meal was served in the field, mess gear was washed and waste disposal carried out in the field incinerators.

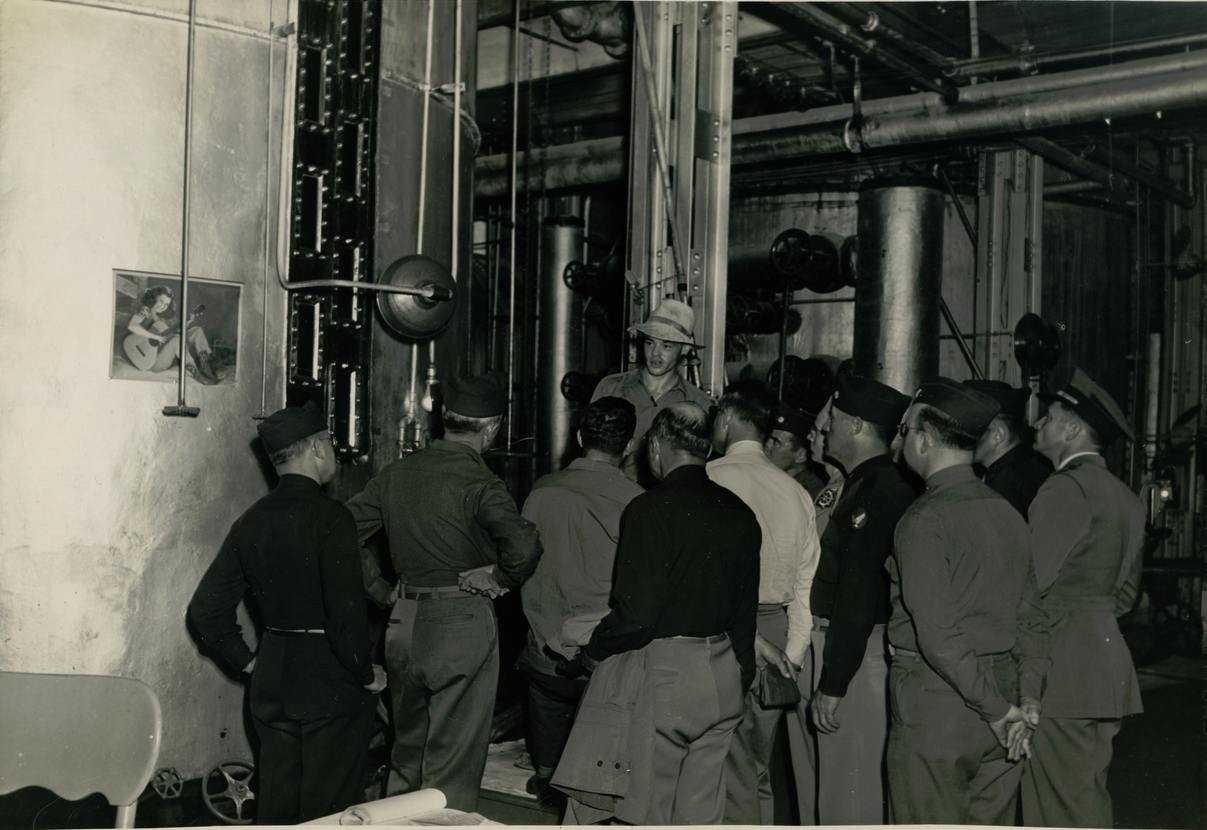
CASA officers receive training at a processing plant located off the Presidio of Monterey post. Training of CASA personnel took place at multiple locations throughout the San Francisco Bay Area and surrounding municipalities including: Vacaville, Berkeley, Sacramento, Davis, Winters, Shoemaker, Biggs, Camp Parks and San Francisco.

===== Water sanitation =====
Water sanitation instruction included: a general discussion of sources of supply, types of equipment, sterilization methods, water discipline, etc. Training aids consisted of: lister bag, knapsack filter, testing sets, automatic chlorinator, pumps, pumping and hypo-chlorinator, purification set No. 1 filter, mobile purification unit, distillation unit, charts, water cans and water trailer.

===== Excreta and waste disposal =====
Instruction on excreta and waste disposal problems, improvisation in the field, operation and maintenance of facilities, selection of disposal sites, etc. Use of training aids included: TF 8-1174 "Disposal of Human waste", Blackboard; sanitation models (table size), latrine box, pail latrine, barrel latrine, trough urinal, pipe urinal, sewage ditches; flush toilets, tip buckets, automatic siphon; Imhoff tank, Septic tank.

===== Mess sanitation =====
Discussion of food selection, preparation, serving and storage in the field; principles of mess sanitation. Training aids included: Films - FS 8-10 "Disposal of wastes"; FS 8-61 "Mess sanitation11; FS 10-106 "Refrigeration in the field'; FS 10-100 "Mobile Kitchen"; and TF 10-1215 " Combat Zone rations, unit messing". Army field range No 1; M 1937 range and equipment; Stove, cooking M 1942, two burner; dehydrated foods; K ration; C ration.

===== Insect and rodent control =====
Insect and rodent control instruction included: general discussion of diseases transmitted to man, insect vectors, methods of extermination, and demonstration of use of all types of equipment. Training aids included: Films: TF 1-3343 "Malaria Discipline"; and TF 8-1288 " Louse-borne diseases". Blackboard, Repellents (612, Indalone, Dimethyphthalate, Combination 6–2–2, Bednet in place, head nets, mosquito protective gloves, plastic screen, 16x18 mesh screen, aerosol bomb, methyl bromide, fumigation bag, fly spray, fly trap, sodium arsenite, DDT dust plus talc, DDT dust plus pyrophyllite, DDT 5% kerosene spray, paris green undiluted, paris green 5% with flour, fuel oil, borax, paradichlchlorobenzene rotary duster, knapsack sprayer, hand sprayer, delousing duster, motor driven duster, motor-driven sprayer, mosquito larva, pupa and adult specimens, fly egg, larva, pupa and adult specimens, flea larva, pupa and adult specimens, Phlebotomus adult specimens, louse egg, nymph and adult specimens, bedbug egg, nymph and adult specimens, cockroach egg, nymph and adult specimens, rat poisons (barium carbonate, zinc phosphide, calcium cyanide, cyanide discoids), rat traps, bait box.

===== Field sanitation =====
Explanation and demonstration of sanitary appliances used in the field included: training aids; (Actual appliances in operation constructed from salvage material), water storage basin, lister bag and soakage pit, water heating unit, vapor burner, flash burner, shower, washing platform, hand laundry, barrel washer, mess gear pre-sterilization, heating units, kitchen fly, kitchen tables, serving table, garbage stand, fly traps mess gear washer, garbage pit, underground cooling box, suspended food box, barrel incinerator, garbage strainer, log can inclined plane incinerator, barrel inclined plane incinerator, ash barrel grease trap, barrel baffle grease trap, box baffle grease trap, soakage pit, soakage trench, hand washer, straddle trenches, latrine box, pail latrine, trough urinal, squatter box, pipe urinal, square trough urinal, pedal hand washer, feces burner.

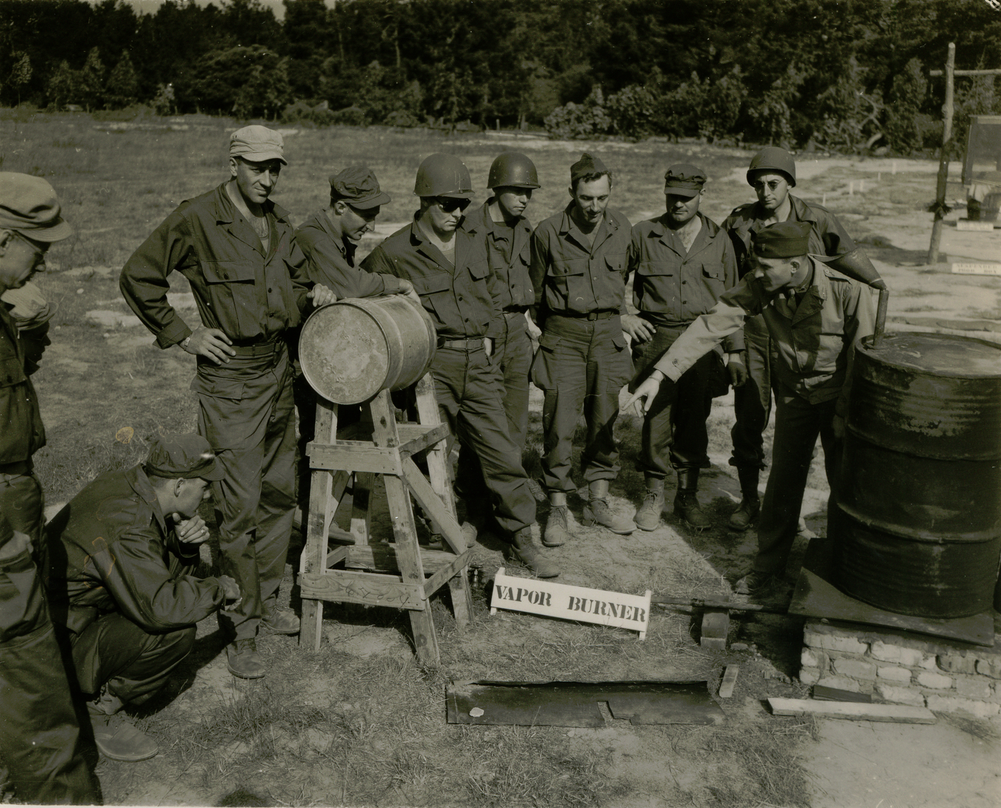
Civil Affairs Staging Area (CASA) soldiers receive training on a vapor burner. Vapor burners were used to heat water for mess kit cleaning and bathing.

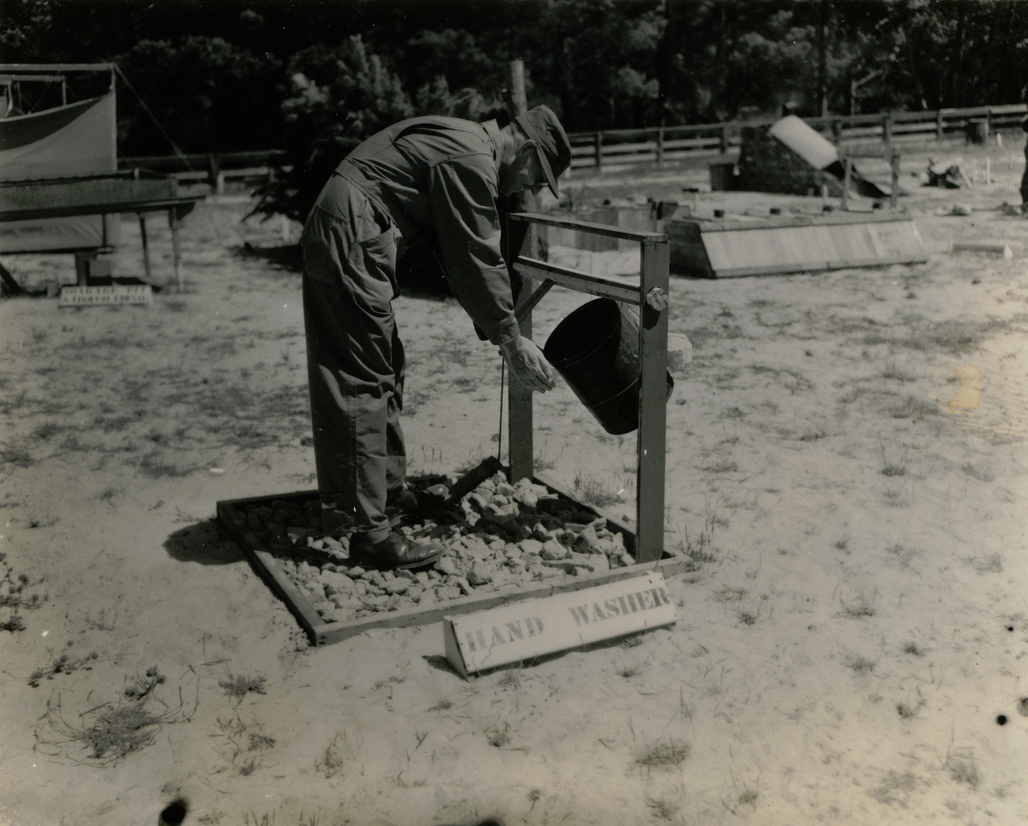
A CASA soldier demonstrates the use of a hand washer.

===== General orientation - heath and sanitation =====
This course involved an introduction to the CASA training plan, objectives and responsibilities of Civil Affairs/Military Government teams and discussion of general health problems and their solution as applied to MG staff and civilians, with special emphasis on, "Health as a Command function."

===== Supplementary lectures =====
- Officers from the Sanitation Section gave 20 one hour lectures on responsibilities and duties of Sanitary officers on Military Government teams. These lectures were given to personnel assigned to teams as administrative, legal, public safety, public welfare, engineering, supply, labor, and economics of officers.
- A two and one half day functional training course for engineering and medical officers was given on operation of water treatment equipment.
- A two and one half day course was organized on water borne sewage. This course included lectures on principles of waste disposal and a trip to two sewage disposal plants at Carmel and Salinas. The training aids included flow charts, syphon flush toilets, tip bucket, flush latrine, tip can flush latrine, Imhoff tank, septic tank, and several types of sewage conduits.

==== Medical Section ====
The instruction under the Medical Section included a course on first aid and a lecture tour of the Sanitary Demonstration Area at the East Garrison of Fort Ord. In addition, a 2 1/2-day functional training course was given to engineering and medical officers on operation of water-treating equipment. This instruction included operation of the following equipment: knapsack-type, hand-operated water filter; automatic hypochlorinator, pumping and hypochlorinating unit, purification unit No 1 (pressure filter), mobile purification unit, and distillation unit. Supplementing the above, instruction and a four-hour lecture tour was given at the Ninth Service Command laboratory on the chemical and bacteriological analyses of water. This course included lectures on principles of waste disposal and a trip to two sewage disposal plants at Carmel and Salinas.

===== Endemic and epidemic diseases =====
This course covered endemic and epidemic diseases of the Pacific Area. The course included general symptomatology, methods of spread and special control measures for cholera, plague, scrub typhus, schistosomiasis, filariasis, etc.

==== Medical Supply Section ====
In addition to medical training and sanitary training, there was also a section devoted to medical supply training. This course had as its objectives.

- To train Civil Affairs officers in medical supply problems and programs of Military Government
- Train and prepare Medical Department personnel in their responsibilities and functions with respect to medical supplies. Training aids included War Department film strips and training films.

== Theater Planning and Research Division ==
=== Internal Affairs Branch ===
==== Governmental Organization and Administration Section ====
The work of the Governmental Organization and Administration Section began in May 1945 with an analysis of the various Ministries of Japan's government. The group made suggestions with regard to Military Government organization for Japan at the national level. It drew up plans for the Ministries subsection and for the Legislative subsection, Military Government, Japan. It developed and printed a "Military Government Functional Chart" which shows the progressive stages of Military Government by functions, the availability of native governmental organizations for administration and recommendations for their use. It prepared draft copies of directives for Military Government, Japan. In June the group began preliminary studies of and an outline for a Manual on Military Government, Japan.

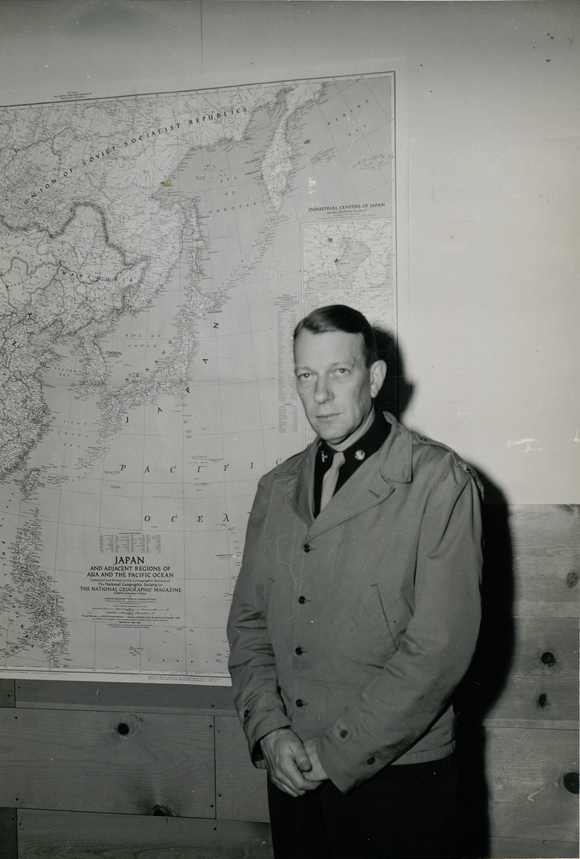
Civil Affairs Staging Area (CASA) Commander - Colonel Hardy C. Dillard stands in front of a large map of Japan at the Theater Planning and Research Division in the Spring of 1945.

==== Public Health Section ====
The Public Health Section prepared a list and a map showing location of hospitals and other medical facilities in Japan, and a list of medical personnel in Japan. It also brought out a functional chart for Public Health. It outlined and began work on a Technical Manual. It made a listing of basic drugs to supplement the CAD Medical Units, a flow chart of Medical supplies and the draft of a nutrition plan for Japan.

==== Public Welfare Section ====
The Public Welfare Section prepared a list of projects as a guide for its own activities. This list was superseded almost immediately by a new list of projects received from higher authority. The projects listed were charts of the Japanese Welfare Ministry, objectives and policies of Military Government public welfare work (also to be put into chart form), directives and proclamations, and a series of forms and records.

==== Education Section ====
The Education Section prepared a series of memoranda including immediate objectives of the Education Section, Japan, long range plans for education, administrative organization, and staff requirements in headquarters and in the field. The group undertook the collection of a large number of Japanese school textbooks and of other works on education in Japan. The Chief of Section spent five weeks visiting major educational institutions on the Pacific Coast, collecting Japanese textbooks and other materials, and interviewing persons who had some personal experience with education in Japan. The group secured the services of translators who began the translation of the more important of the textbooks. Two additional memoranda were written; a suggested editorial policy for the revision of Japanese textbooks and a proposal that Katakana be adopted as the official language.

==== Public Safety Section ====
The Public Safety section prepared a Standing Operating Procedure for Public Safety, Japan. It made a government vehicle survey, Japan. It also studied opium and other narcotic controls. The Fire subsection made a survey of fire protection methods in Japan, and studied the water system and firefighting equipment of Japan.

==== Counter Intelligence Section ====
In addition to the usual tasks performed by all branches and sections, the Counter Intelligence Section carried on research on Japanese associations and societies, and on subversive individuals.

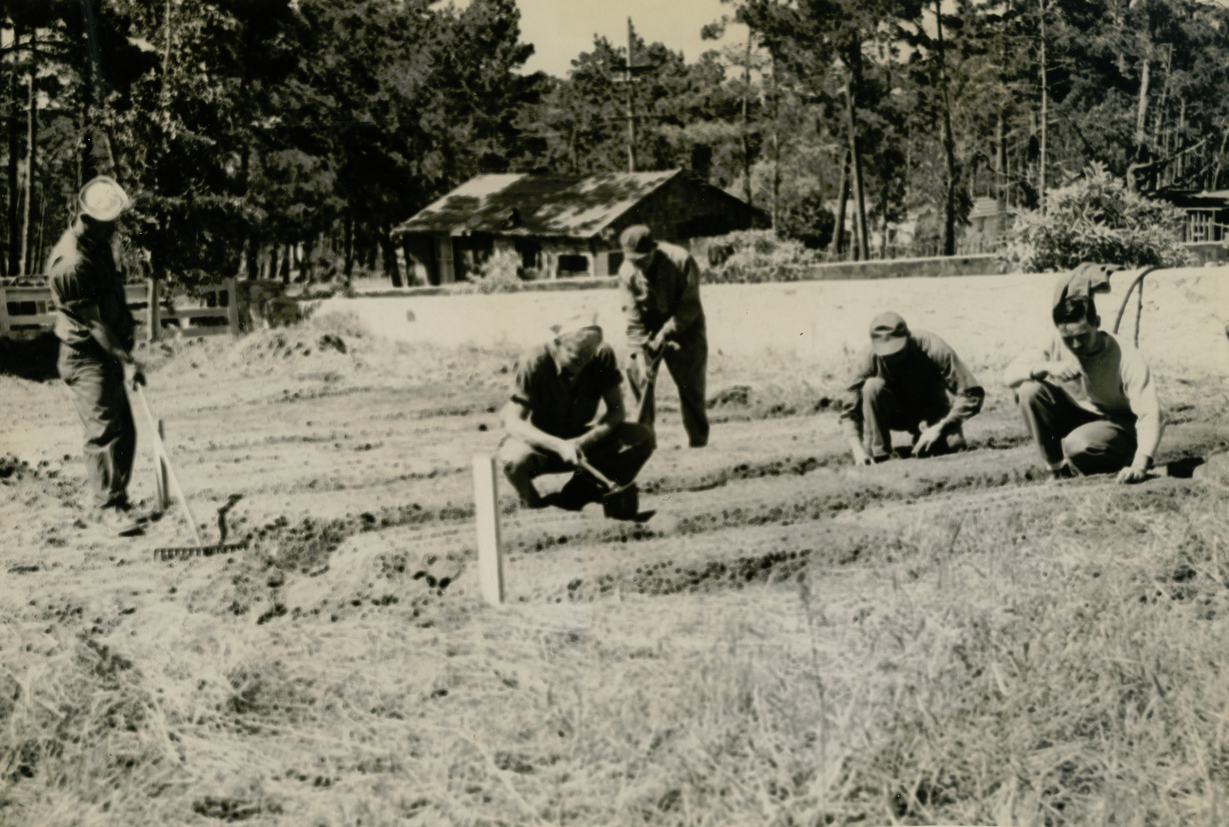
CASA soldiers and sailors plant Daikon and other oriental vegetables in the CASA garden

=== Finance Branch ===
The Finance Branch initiated and forwarded a request to the Treasury Department, Washington, for data on property in Japan, Korea, Formosa and Manchukuo.

=== Supply Branch ===
It was the function of the Supply Branch to consolidate and revise the T/0 and E's (table of organization and equipment) submitted to it by all the other branches and sections of the Planning Staff. It also prepared a plan for overall Theater supply procedures - Military Government, Japan.

=== Economics Branch ===
The Economics Branch included a large number of sections, subsections, units, and produced a considerable quantity of material of a research and survey nature and also a series of plans for the control of Japan's economic institutions.

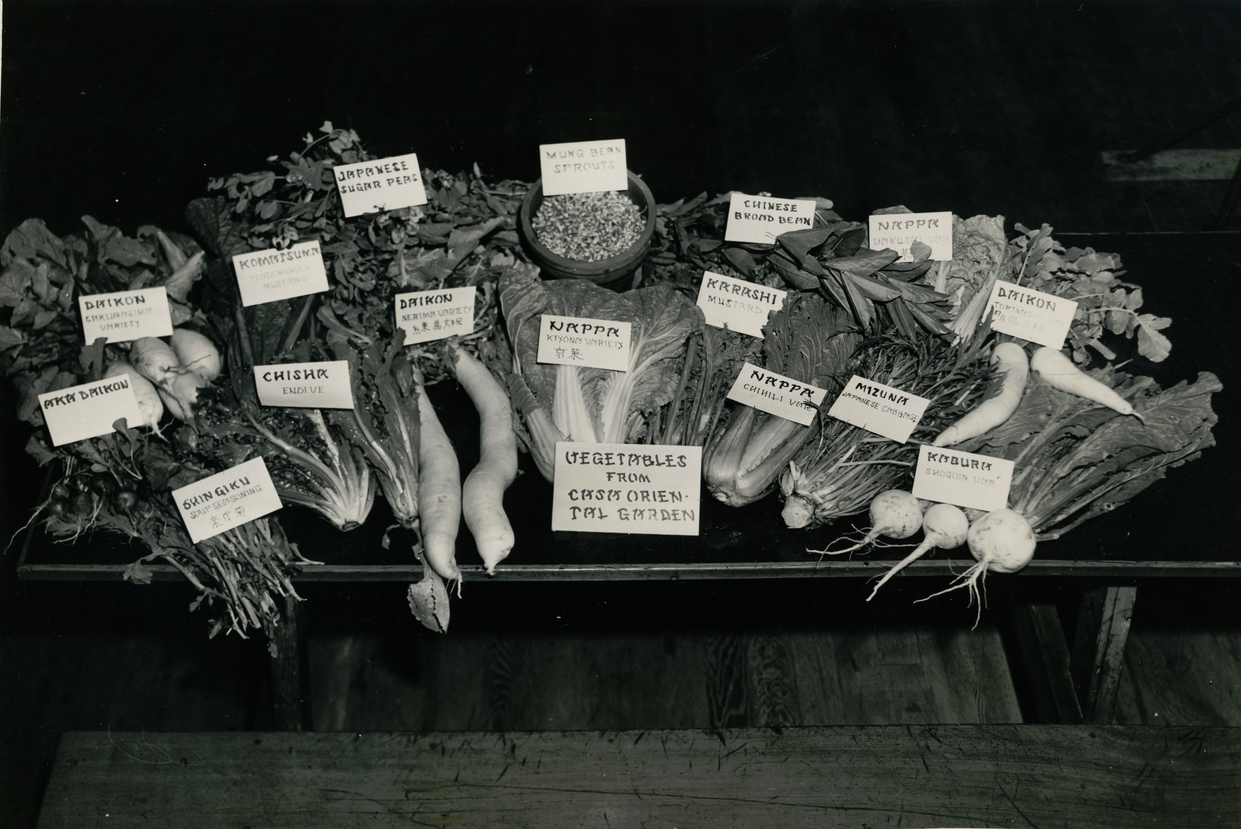
Oriental vegetables grown in the garden at CASA.

==== Agricultural Section ====
Among many other items, the Section produced a memorandum of basic policies and activities considered essential to maximizing the availability of supplies of food in Japan, a study of Japanese agriculture and related problems, a systematic digest of Japanese agricultural agencies, channels of authority and functions of various units, a study of land tenure in relation to farm labor, a study on problems of increasing agricultural production, an outline of policies plans, procedure, etc., with reference to land reclamation, and a study of the organization and operation of the Ministry of Agriculture. In addition to its work on Japanese agriculture, the Section did considerable work of highly classified nature on agricultural problems of the East China Coast. This was based on the assumption that S-5(planning) might be charged with the responsibility for planning Military Government operations for this area.

=== Transportation and Communications Branch ===
One of the projects proposed by the Water Transportation Subsection and approved by the Steering Committee was that of surveying port petroleum problems. This study had three parts.

- Port petroleum problems in general, and specific problems in the United States, as a background for the work on Japan
- Port petroleum problems of Japan
- The development of plans for Military Government Port petroleum administration - Japan.

=== Legal Branch ===
The Legal Branch prepared a series of overlay maps showing the location of various types of courts and penal institutions in Japan. Its primary efforts were devoted to the study of the Ministry of Justice. The group prepared a chart of the organization and bureaus of the Ministry. It undertook a detailed study of the functions of the Ministry, and prepared the outline of a plan for Military Government supervision of the Ministry.

=== Public Works and Utilities Branch ===
The Public Works and Utilities Branch prepared a draft memorandum on the scope and principal functions of the electric power and water utilities of Japan. It initiated a population study of each of the forty-six prefectures and of two hundred municipalities of Japan with the object of determining the utilities requirements of Japan, In July 1945 the group began to compile an index of the water works of Japan.

=== Research Branch ===
==== Prefecture Manuals (Research Unit #1) ====
Research Unit#1 operated over a longer period of time with a much larger staff than any other research group. Its objective was to produce an informational volume, covering a great many aspects of Japanese life, on each of the forty-six prefectures of Japan.

Outline of Volume for Prefecture Manuals - Japan
Physical Background	Population & Settlements	Economy	Public Service	Social Organizations & Cultural Institutions	Who's Who	Appendices	Maps
Terrain regions; Hydrology; Climate; Weather	Population; Cities; Towns	Labor; Agriculture; Fisheries; Forest Resources; Mining; Manufacturing; Construction; Construction materials; Trade & commerce; Finance	Transportation; Communications; Utilities	Government and administration; Public Safety; Legal Affairs; Health and sanitation; Public Welfare; Education; Associations; Cultural Institutions	List according to occupation; Alphabetical directory	List of manufacturers; List of products; Railroad lines; Electric generating plants; Transformer sub-stations; Place names and locations; Table of weights and measures	Maps; (in separate folder)

The number of pages in each completed volume varied from 125 to 335 with an approximate average of 175 pages. The amount of research necessary to secure adequate information for the writing of these volumes was enormous. The cooperation of OSS/Casa Outpost enabled the Research Group to secure access to materials drawn from all over the United States, and even from foreign countries. Translation facilities of OSS were provided, as were also the facilities of the translation pool of the Japanese Language School, University of Michigan, and the translation pool. Provost Marshal General's Office, Washington. Work on the manuals was delayed by the inability of the Research Staff to secure the services of an adequate number of typists. References to this difficulty are repeated many times in the weekly reports of the division. Finally, when a deadline was set, it became necessary to transfer typists from other activities, and of course, for everyone to work under considerable pressure. By 20 July, 7 of the manuals had been completed and sent to OSS/San Francisco for off-set printing. Even a cursory examination of the completed prefectural manuals shows that the Group did a highly commendable job. Most of the members of the research group were not trained in research. They had to work under pressure and do all kinds of work, even to editing and proofreading, and in some cases, typing. The completed volumes probably contain more information about Japan than is to be found in any other single source in the English language.

==== Finance Group (Research Unit #2) ====
The Finance Group requested, during the week prior to 1 June 1945, that they be authorized to initiate a project which developed into a technical manual named A Manual on the Administration of Japanese Public and Private Finance The request for authorization was approved by the Steering Committee. The outline of the volume was as follows:

Outline of Volume for Administration of Japanese Public and Private Finance
Book 1	Book 2
1. The Wartime Fiscal Policy of Japan; 2. Private Finance; Financial Institutions; Corporation Finance; 3. Public Finance; National Financial Organization; National Financial Functions; Public Finance in the Administrative Districts; Prefectural Finance; City Finance; Tokyo Public Finance; Public Finance in Towns and Villages	1. Financial Who's Who; Institutional Roster; Alphabetic Roster; Glossary of Financial Terms; General Financial Vocabulary; 1. English to Romaji; 2. Romaji to English; Special Vocabularies - English to Romaji; Bureaus of the Finance Ministry and related Government Agencies; 2. Prescribed Financial Statements for ordinary banks, English, Romaji and Kanji.

Like the prefectural manuals, the above work required a tremendous amount of research, which, in turn, necessitated the procurement of documentary material from many outside sources. The completed volume of 550 pages is probably the most complete source of financial information on Japan that is available in English.

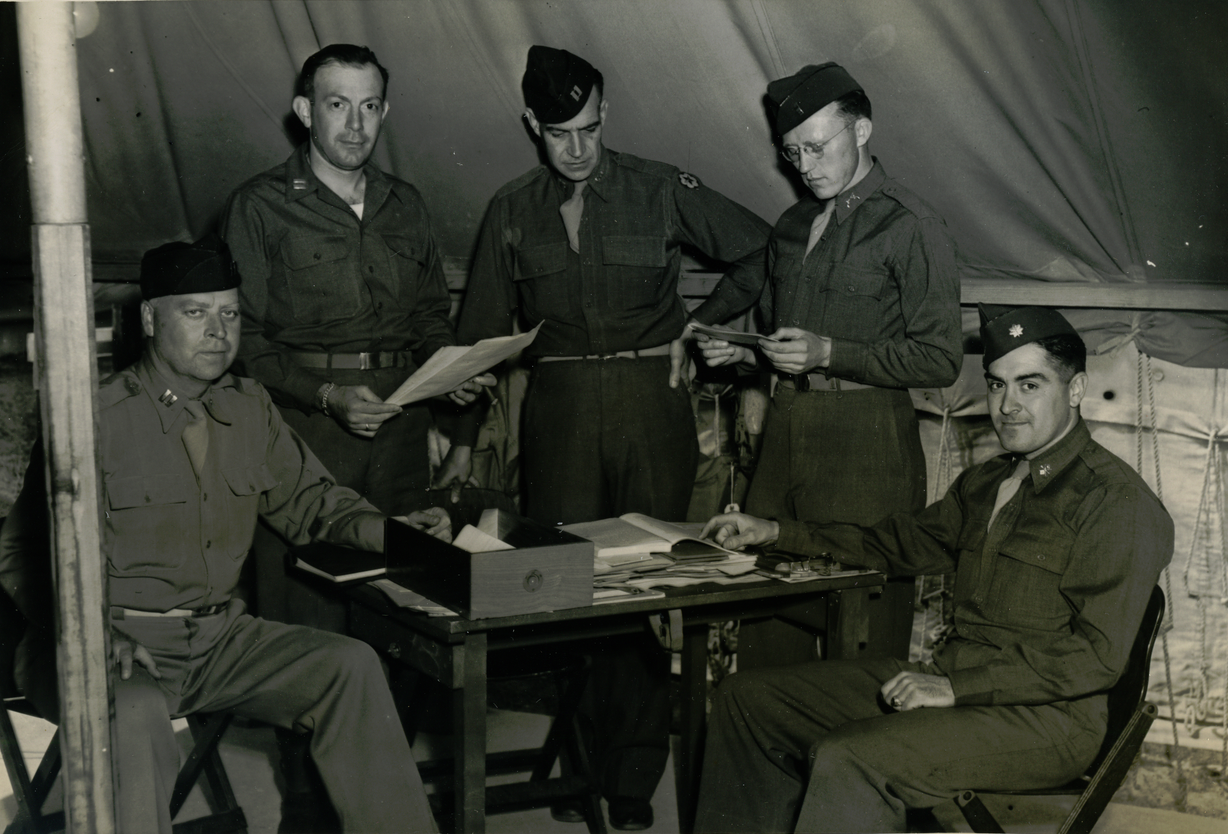
Civil Affairs Staging Area (CASA) officers in the Research Section of the Theater Planning & Research Division, review material.

==== Government Group (Research Unit #3) ====
The Government research group was absorbed into the planning section on Governmental Organization and Administration, and the two groups worked as one. For this reason, there are no separate reports on the work of Research Unit #3.

==== Public Relations Group (Research Unit #4) ====
This project began in March 1945 as an effort to explain something of the psychology of the Japanese people with the objective of using this psychology in connection with Military Government control of civilians. The title of the project, as originally stated, was:, Field Techniques of Japanese Civilian Control. The group was, however, reorganized, the title and outline changed, and the work became a Handbook on Japanese Behavior and Customs By the latter part of July 1945 the volume was completed in rough draft form, preparatory to editing and revision.

==== Public Health Group (Research Unit #5) ====
The main efforts of the Public Health Research Group were devoted to the compilation of a Japanese-English Medical Vocabulary and Phrase book The vocabulary items to be used were first selected by a group of medical officers assigned to this group. The English terms were then translated into Japanese by the Japanese language instructors at CASA.

==== Agricultural Research Group - Japan and China Coast (Research Unit #6) ====
The agricultural research group, like the Government research group, worked with its section of the planning staff so completely that little distinction is possible. It spent considerable time studying the fruit and vegetable production of Japan, the forests and forest products of Japan, and undertook a classified study of food supplies and agriculture on the East China Coast. The East China Coast study included such items as problems of an adequate supply of protein foods, problems of administration, food storage, currency, price control, rationing, etc.

==== Special investigations ====
At the request of the Theater, Major Irwin M. Isaacs carried on two investigations.

1. To determine the type of equipment required for processing the offal fish and to determine the availability of fish reduction plants with a capacity of one and two tons per hour.
2. To secure technical information on soap plants in the Pacific area, with a view to finding the type of plants suitable for making soap from the oils of copra and vegetable products.

== Office of Strategic Services (OSS) CASA Outpost ==
=== Establishment ===
The Office of Strategic Services established an Outpost at the Civil Affairs Holding and Staging Area, Fort Ord, California, effective 1 February 1945. This activity was established as the result of a request made by the Director, Civil Affairs Division, Washington, to(then) Brigadier General William Donovan Director, Office of Strategic Services. The request had its origin in the desire of Major General Hilldring, Director, CAD (Civil Affairs Division), to duplicate for the Pacific Theater the successful work of the OSS at Shrivenham, England, in helping plan for Military Government in the European Theater The understanding arrived at between the OSS and the Civil Affairs Division included the following salient points:

- The OSS Outpost detachment was to be composed of personnel and facilities exclusively from the agency's Research and Analysis Branch.
- The primary function of the Outpost was to provide expert consultation service in its work with the Planning and Research Division (S-5), CASA. A secondary function was to serve the CASA divisions and activities with intelligence materials and staff to the extent that time would permit.
- In addition to permanent staff members, OSS was to rotate highly specialized personnel when CASA and OSS programs would benefit and when demands upon OSS by the Joint Chiefs of Staff would permit such rotation.
- Physical facilities such as office space, equipment and supplies, etc. were to be provided by CASA, as well as quarters and post privileges comparable to those accorded officers.
- The Outpost was to have independent status and was to report its activities directly to OSS/Washington.

=== Personnel ===
The OSS personnel who served at the CASA Outpost were specialists in various professional fields. The permanent staff was selected to provide a wide range of such specialties, and consultants who were brought in from time to time were also selected for their specialized knowledge. The staff and consultants included Army, Navy, Marine Corps officers and civilian personnel.

==== Permanent positions at OSS Outpost ====
1. Chief's Office
  - Chief of Office, Administrative Assistant, Staff Secretary, Clerk-Typist.
2. Analysis Section
  - Senior Economist, Junior Economist
  - Senior Geographer, Junior Geographer
  - Senior Political Analyst, Junior Political Analyst
1. Map Section
  - Map Intelligence Specialist, Cartographer.
2. Research Section
  - Senior Research Analyst, Junior Biographical Records Analyst, Research Reference Specialists
3. Consultants
  - A total of thirty-five consultants came to the Outpost for periods varying from one day to a week each. The consultants came to help the permanent Outpost staff, and to advise and consult with the Planning and Research Division (S-5) CASA, or to render service to both.

=== Functions ===
The functions of the Outpost fell into three broad categories:

- The Prefectural Project
- Consultation on Planning
- Miscellaneous Functions

==== The Prefectural Project ====
CASA early conceived the idea of producing an intelligence manual for each of the Japanese prefectures. The purpose of the manual was to provide the military government officer with a single volume of information, not elsewhere available in organized form, of a local and regional nature. OSS was asked to provide research materials of a classified nature, expert direction and supervision of research methods and techniques, and final editing and approval of each manual. In addition, a map packet was to constitute an integral part of each manual. Each map-packet was to contain 20 to 30 maps selected by OSS, covering the prefecture and its parts, and was also to include a map made especially for Military Government. OSS was to procure maps already produced from its own collection, from the hydrographic Office, G-2, and Army Map Service. The map, which was to be especially made for Military Government, was to be produced by CASA officers, making base maps and overlays, and OSS/Washington was to care for drafting and reproduction.

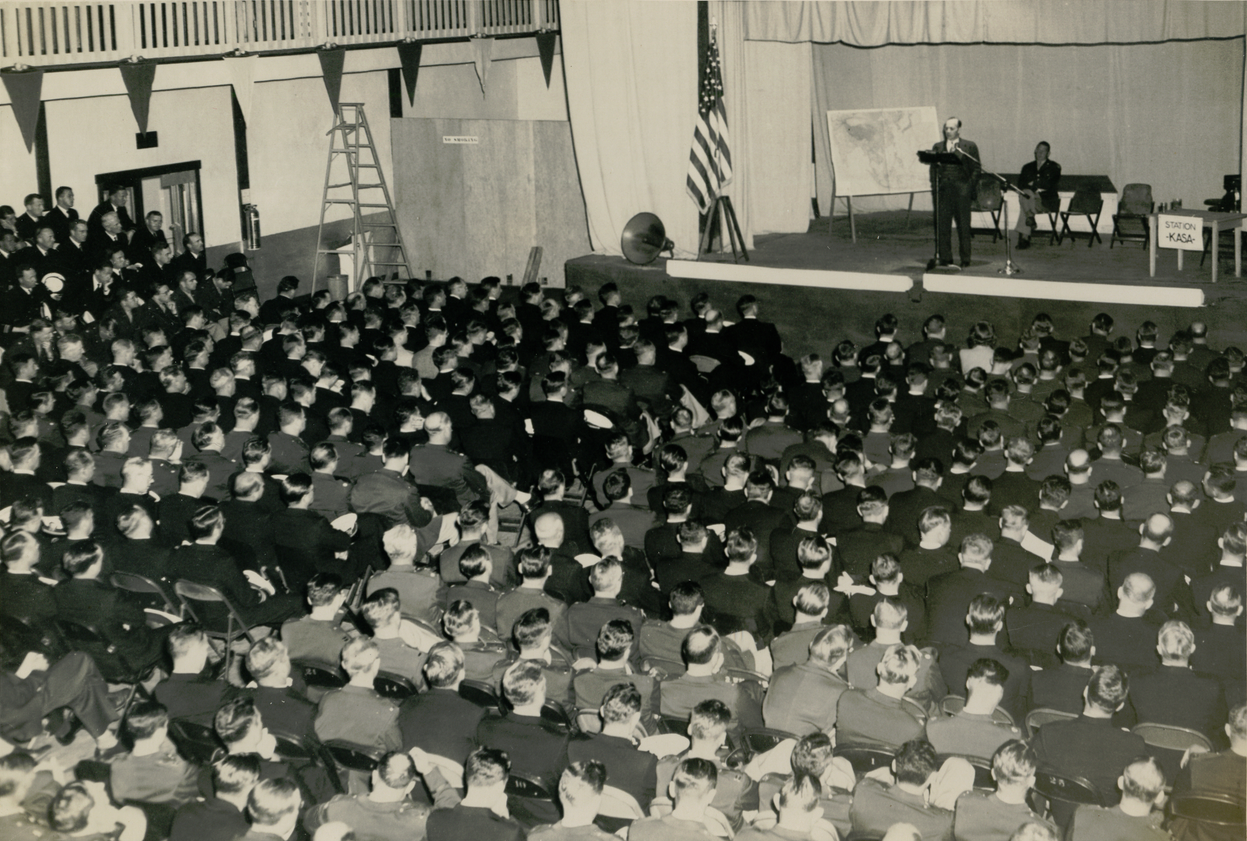
Assembled CASA Army / Navy officers, in front of a stage with a large map of Asia, listen to a civilian speaker.

===== Assignment of officers =====
For research and writing of the textual part of the manuals, CASA assigned an average of 75 Army and Navy officers, who worked about six months on the project. OSS provided classified documentary material and aided the CASA library in the procurement of non classified material. OSS also established the research techniques and methods, evaluated materials, and worked directly with the officers in the collection of data and writing of text.

===== Production volume =====
The production volume was large: The Provost Marshal General's Office arranged for the printing of 75,000 volumes of manuals, the number of copies for each prefecture varying with the importance of the prefecture involved. Each manual averaged 175 pages. About 1,000,000 maps were required for map packets.

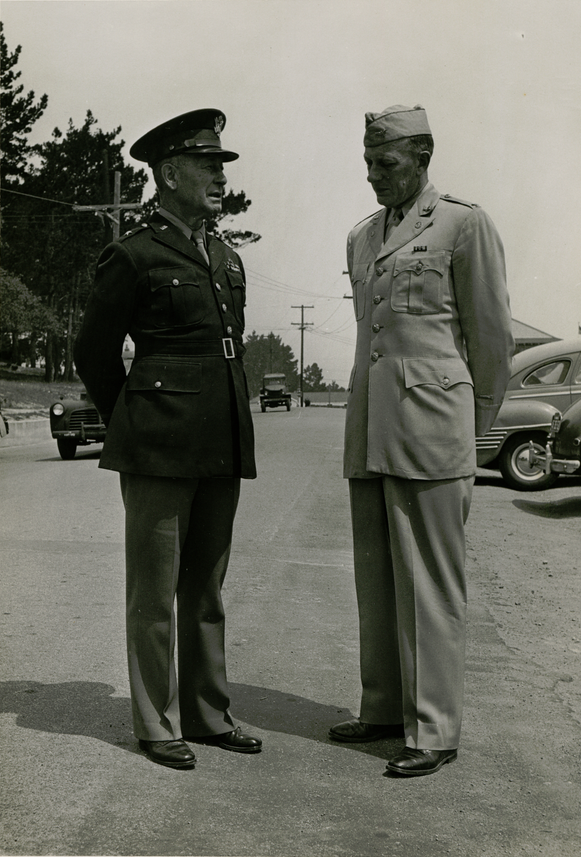
CASA Commanding Officer Brig. General Percy L. Sadler and former CASA Commander Colonel Hardy Cross Dillard, acting CASA Executive Officer, at the Presidio of Monterey in July 1945.

===== Expediting of process =====
As the pace of operations in the Pacific Theater increased, it became apparent that the program, as originally timed, would not be completed quickly enough. CASA and OSS therefore greatly expedited the production of a few copies each of manuals on thirteen leading prefectures. OSS/San Francisco cooperated to accomplish reproduction, and the first copies, together with map packets, were sent to the Theater in time to arrive there by the time American occupation began. The regular edition, was produced later over a number of weeks.

===== Reception of manuals =====
OSS/Washington made a major contribution to the Prefectural project by making available its research resources, its facilities, and its personnel in an advisory capacity. OSS/San Francisco also stood by at all times with assistance and took over entirely the reproduction of the provisional edition of manuals on thirteen prefectures. The manuals were received with commendation and appreciation by all those, interested in intelligence materials pertaining to the Far East, who had an opportunity to examine them.

==== Consultation on planning ====
The planning activities of the Outpost were consultative in nature. A few outstanding contributions by the OSS Outpost include:

===== Chart creation =====
Creation of two detailed charts. These charts were jointly produced by OSS and S-5 Division, CASA and were reproduced in quantity by OSS/San Francisco. Since the charts were incorporated in various economic directives, effects of this research and analysis are far-reaching. The two charts were:

- The Role of the Munitions Ministry in the Control of Japanese Wartime Industries
- The Dual Administration of War Production in Japan

===== Proclamations & ordinances =====
Final review and approval by OSS consultants of all proclamations and ordinances prepared at CASA for use by Military Government in occupying Japan. This was done under short deadlines and was accomplished by the Outpost furnishing two experts on Japanese law and Japanese language. One of the experts was formally commended by the CASA command for his participation in this project.

===== Review of bibliographies =====
Review of proposed bibliographies to be taken to the Theater by various planning groups. In this task, the accumulated knowledge of 0SS staff members was of great help to the CASA planning sections.

==== Miscellaneous functions ====
This category of functions contains some of the most outstanding services performed by the Outpost. These services were rendered to various divisions and in some instances were of incalculable benefit to CASA and the Military Government program for the Far East. Among the most noteworthy of these services, are the following:

===== Map intelligence =====
From its inception, the Outpost included in its staff a map intelligence analyst. The analyst selected and recommended all the maps for map packets in the prefectural project, procured and maintained on a catalogue basis all important maps covering the Far East and provided maps for cartographers making maps for the prefectural project. The collection was estimated at 30,000 sheets and this represented virtually the heart of all map activity at CASA. Not only did the analyst provide maps, but he also prepared written articles, met with discussion groups and served as an expert consultant to CASA groups on all map matters. For example, in arriving at a decision as to what maps were to be included in kits for Military Government officers, the primary selection was made by the map intelligence analyst. The CASA map instruction program was revised with his assistance. Requests made upon the Outpost for service averaged upward of 300 each month and there was at all times a large number of maps in circulation. Requests originated largely from the Training Division (S-3) and the Planning and Research Division (S-5), but OSS also provided, maps required for a variety of purposes, from supplying maps for the map-room operated by S-2 to meeting occasional requests from Fort Ord. Maps provided, covered a wide range in scales topics subject and purpose. Although OSS came as a consultant and therefore could not attempt to supply maps in quantity, help was given CASA in obtaining maps through the Army Map Service, and the development of a map function by the CASA library was accomplished with the help of OSS.

===== Advice on Orientalia and information materials =====
Although the Outpost maintained a large collection of classified documents covering the Far East, there was careful avoidance of assuming a library function. The Outpost did, however, maintain close liaison with the CASA library and endeavored to be helpful in obtaining various materials needed for planning and training. The OSS experts were familiar with all types of source material, both domestic and foreign, and provided much information on what was needed and where it was obtainable.

===== Maintenance of research files =====
In a very few weeks the Outpost built up an impressive collection of the best available documentary intelligence on the Far East. This collection was constantly increased through the close cooperation of OSS/Washington, various OSS offices in continental United States, and offices and Outposts throughout the world. Some of the documents maintained by the OSS Outpost included.

- Various joint Army -Navy Intelligence Studies covering the Far East.
- Prisoner of War Reports
- OSS/R&A Reports
- Joint Target Group Folders
- Foreign Economic Administration reports
- Strategic Engineering Studies (US Engineers)
- Civil Affairs Guides
- MIS Bulletin

===== Maintenance of biographical records =====
This file consisted of approximately 15,000 items covering key Japanese personalities. Not only was the file of great value to the prefectural project, but also to training groups and to various planning sections.

===== Translation =====
Although the Outpost had clearly specified to CASA that OSS could not provide translation, the dire need at CASA led the agency on several occasions to provide translations by its Outpost staff, by its Washington staff or from other OSS sources. In addition, the Outpost endeavored to help CASA obtain an adequate number of translators so that CASA could more effectively do its job.

===== Creation of special intelligence reports =====
For about three months after its inception the Outpost published a weekly bulletin entitled, Far East Intelligence Notes This weekly contained various analytical articles prepared by Outpost personnel and was based upon information from classified sources and of interest to Military Government officers. The Notes frequently included maps. The pressure of work led to the suspension of the weekly and the Outpost began irregular publication of Special Intelligence Reports Each report covered one topic, was concerned with Military Government problems in the Far East and was issued at intervals of ten days to two weeks. As in the case of the Far East Intelligence Notes, information was drawn from classified sources. The circulation list of the Notes was small but impressive. Copies were sent to all Civil Affairs Training Schools, to the School of Military Government, Charlottesville, Virginia, to the OSS Washington, to the Civil Affairs Division, Washington, to the Provost Marshal General's Office, Washington to CinCPAC (Commander in Chief Pacific), CinCPOA (Commander in Chief Pacific Ocean Areas) and to various OSS outposts. The Reports were distributed only at CASA.

== Special events ==
=== President Roosevelt memorial ceremony ===
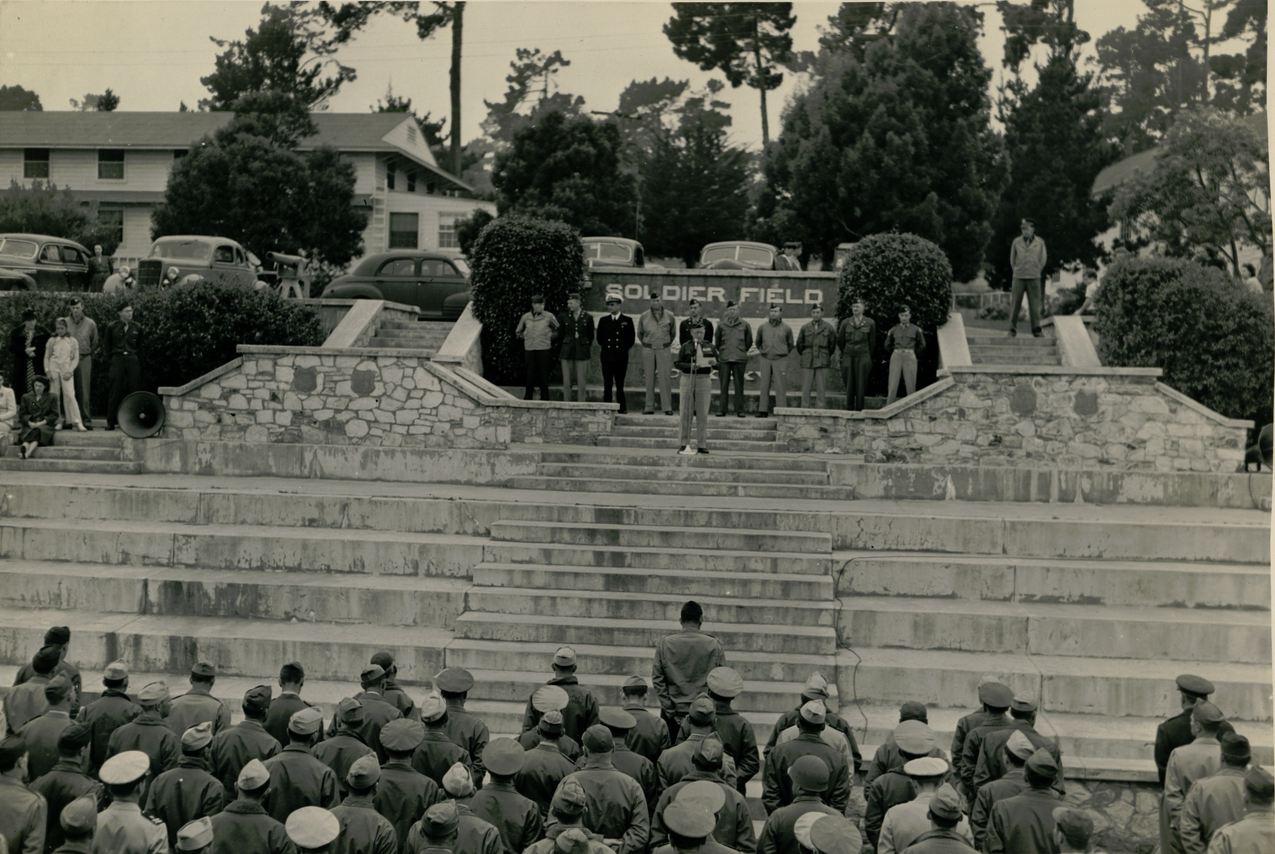
Civil Affairs Staging Area (CASA) officers and enlisted men, along with civilian personnel, gather on Soldier Field at the Presidio of Monterey in April 1945 for the memorial ceremony of President Franklin D. Roosevelt.

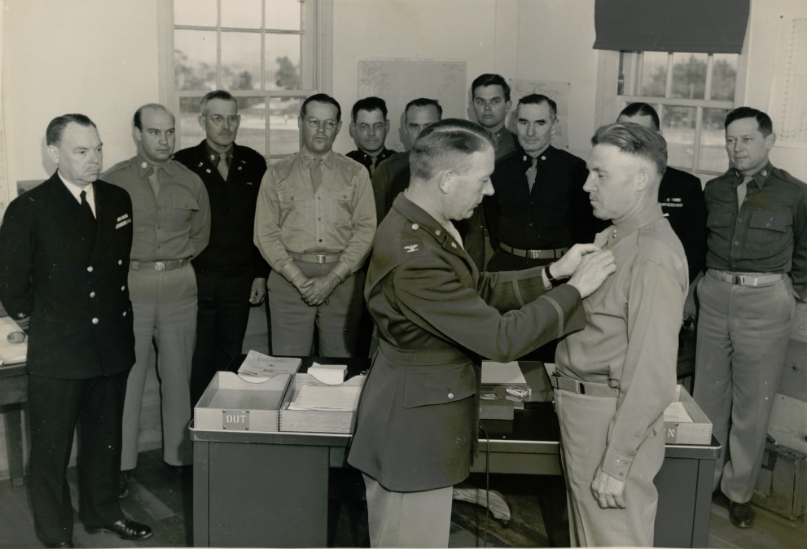
CASA Commander - Colonel Hardy C. Dillard pins the Bronze Star on Lt. Colonel Presley W. Melton.

From: Casalog Vol I, No 2, 18 April 1945,
ROOSEVELT MEMORIAL CEREMONY 14 April 1945.

CASA paid tribute to Franklin Delano Roosevelt, the man who gave his life for humanity, at one o'clock last Saturday afternoon on Soldier's Field. At the same time, (4 PM Eastern War Time) simple funeral services were being held in the East Room of the White House, where his body lay draped in state. The ceremony here was part of the memorial service conducted by all Army installations in this country and many overseas. It was attended by all CASA training companies. Headquarters Company, Ship's Company, members of the CASA staff, and civilian employees. Concerning President Roosevelt, Colonel Hardy C. Dillard, Commanding Officer, said,

"The leader of his people in a great war, he lived to see the assurance of the victory but not to share it. He lived to see the first foundations of the free and peaceful world to which his life was dedicated, but not to enter on that world himself. We at CASA join with our countrymen here and abroad in a sense of deep reverence for the passing of our great leader, whose faith and courage gave hope (and will always continue to give hope) and spirit and fighting faith to freedom-loving people everywhere."

=== Bronze Star Award ===
From: Casalog Vol I, No 2, 18 April 1945,
AWARD OF BRONZE STAR TO LT COL PRESLEY W. MELTON. 25 April 1945.
Civil Affairs activities received additional recognition ... when Lieutenant Colonel Presley W. Melton, Ordnance Corps, received the Bronze Star for meritorious service in connection with military operations as a member of the G-5 Section of General Eisenhower's Headquarters, European Theater of Operations. The award was presented at a simple ceremony before the CASA staff by Colonel Hardy C. Dillard, Commanding Officer.

"In the European Theater Lieutenant Colonel Melton (then Major) was personally responsible for the formation and coordination of the G-5 plan for the use of Civil affairs personnel in the base section of the Communications Zone from May to October of last year. The citation reads that his performance of this outstanding service has been a major contribution to the war effort, and reflects great credit upon himself and the armed forces of the United States."
