= Hardy Cross Dillard =

American judge

Hardy Dillard
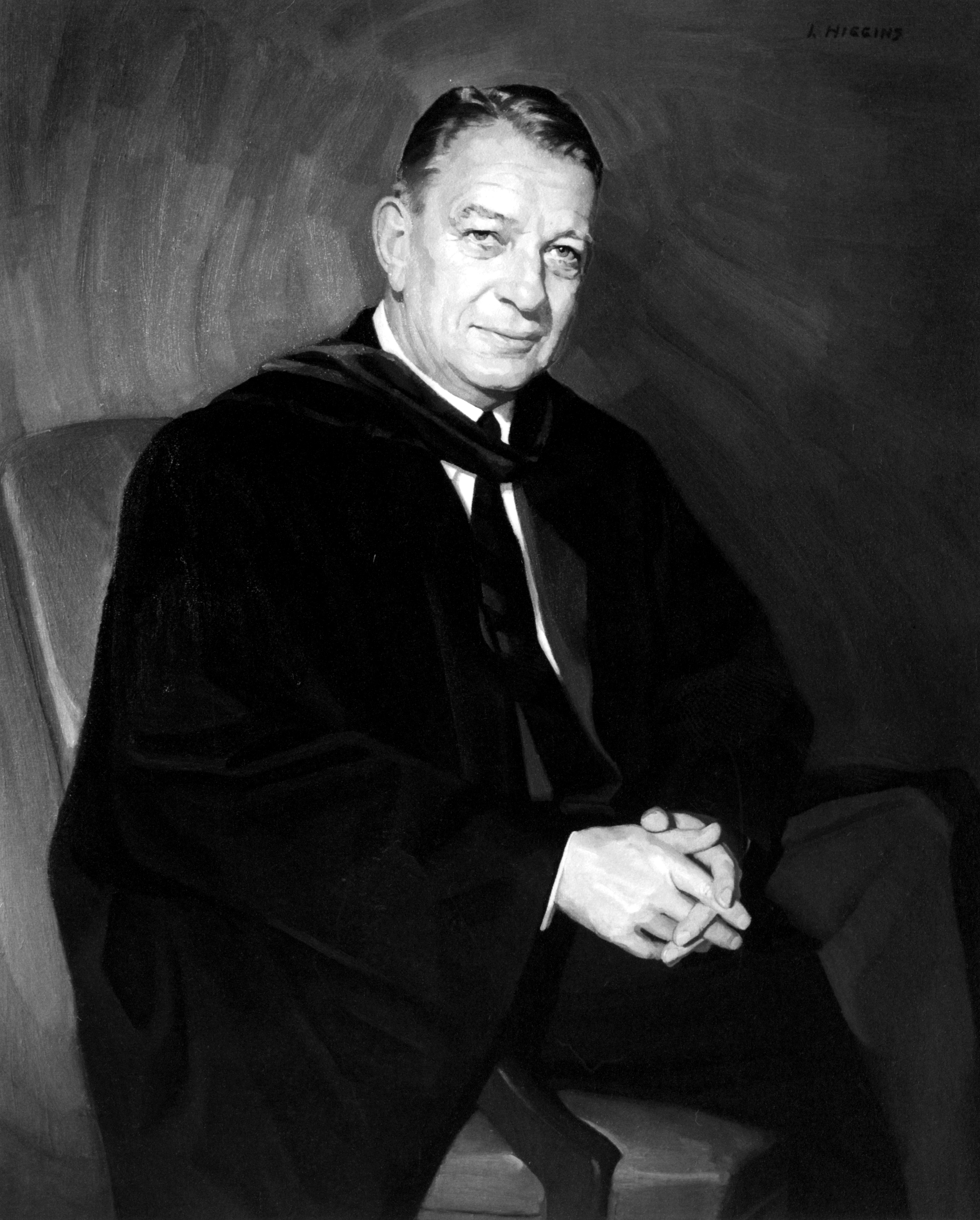

Judge of the International Court of Justice
- In office 1970–1979
- Preceded by: Philip Jessup
- Succeeded by: Richard Baxter

Personal details
- Born: Hardy Cross Dillard; October 23, 1902; New Orleans, Louisiana, U.S.
- Died: May 12, 1982 (aged 79); Charlottesville, Virginia, U.S.
- Spouse(s): Janet Gray Schaufler; Valgerdur Nielsen Dent
- Education: United States Military Academy (BS); University of Virginia (LLB)

Hardy Cross Dillard (23 October 1902 – 12 May 1982) was an American jurist who served as a judge on the International Court of Justice from 1970 to 1979, as a judge appointed by Queen Elizabeth II to a court of arbitration concerning the Beagle Channel islands dispute, Dean of the University of Virginia School of Law (1963–1968), legal adviser to the High Commissioner for Germany (1950), first director of the National War College (1946), and as a colonel in the U.S. Army during World War II (1941–1946). During World War II, Dillard served as deputy chief of staff for civil affairs (G5) in the China Command, Commander of the Civil Affairs Staging Area at the Presidio of Monterey where he oversaw preparation and planning for the Occupation of Japan and as commander of the European Civil Affairs Training Division of SHAEF in preparation for Operation Overlord. Previously, he initiated and served as director of the School of Military Government.

== Early life and academic career ==
Hardy Cross Dillard was the son of Avarene Lippincot Budd and James Hardy Dillard, an educator who devoted his life to the education of African Americans and former Dean of Tulane University. Hardy Cross Dillard was also cousin of civil engineer Hardy Cross – originator of the Hardy Cross method.

Dillard attended the Virginia Episcopal School and later the U.S. Military Academy where he graduated in 1924. Upon graduation, Dillard was commissioned a second lieutenant in the Infantry. However, with the First World War fading in to the background, fresh West Point graduates were encouraged to leave the service. Thus, like many of his classmates, Dillard resigned his commission two months after graduation. He subsequently entered the University of Virginia Law School and served on the editorial board of the Virginia Law Review and was also president of the law school student body. Due to his legal ability, the law faculty took the unusual step of asking him to stay after graduation to serve as an instructor. He taught primarily international law for two years before leaving to become an associate in the New York City law firm of Gregg & Church. After only a year with the law firm, he was awarded a fellowship by the Carnegie Endowment for International Peace to study international law at the University of Paris.

Upon completion of the program, Dillard accepted an appointment as assistant professor of law at the University of Virginia. He returned to New York City in the summers of 1932 and 1933 and worked as an associate at Davis, Polk, Wardwell, Gardiner and Reed. In 1934 he became the university's director of Institute of Public Affairs – an assignment in addition to his law duties. The institute brought prominent speakers to the university from government, business and academia to discuss topics of national and international interest. As the director, Dillard became acquainted with some of the leading figures of the day such as Senator Robert A. Taft, Supreme Court Justice Robert Jackson, Ambassador Paul V McNutt, Owen Lattimore, Thurman Arnold, Max Lerner, David Sarnoff, Rexford Guy Tugwell, Major George Fielding Eliot, Max Eastman, Quincy Howe, and William L. Shirer. Dillard, however, drew controversy by inviting communists such as Earl Browder to speak. A former president of the university's Alumni Association protested in a letter to the Alumni News that Dillard went "beyond freedom of speech" when he offered a rostrum from which the general secretary of the American Communist Party and the Soviet Ambassador could, "spread subversive doctrines." Dillard responded that where controversial topics are selected, "both sides should be fairly heard." A spokesman for Germany was also invited to speak.

== Jurisprudence ==
On 27 October 1970, The U.N. General Assembly and U.N. Security Council elected Dillard to a nine-year term on The International Court of Justice. During his tenure on the Court, Dillard adjudicated seven contentious and three advisory cases. According to his peers, Judge Dillard's ICJ decision's were resolute and consistent with jurisprudence depicted in writings during his years as a legal scholar. Dillard's international jurisprudence espoused an interlocking of law and diplomacy whereby law serves as an "ordering device" which helps in dispute settlement and at the same time leaves room for the parties to play a major role in the final determination. He believed that international law should be realistic, creative, axiologically oriented and also serve as an indicator of emerging norms. Judge Dillard also stressed that the leaders of national governments – described by him as the "wielders of power" – must understand that effective international law is,"essential to the long range national interests of all the components of the international community." Judge Dillard's multi method jurisprudence is reflected in an adage he often used and first noticed on a sign outside of a Unitarian Church in London during the Second World War – between dogmatism on one hand and skepticism on the other, there is a middle way, which is our way - open minded certainty.

== International Court of Justice rulings ==
| Case | Application date | ICJ category | Parties | Challenger | Defendant | Outcome favored | Opinion | Disposition | Appendment |
|---|---|---|---|---|---|---|---|---|---|
| Nuclear Tests | 9 May 1973 | Contentious | NZ vs. France | New Zealand | France | France | Dissenting | App. nullified by Court | Dissenting opinion (joint); Declaration (joint) |
| Nuclear Tests | 20 December 1974 | Contentious | Australia vs. France | Australia | France | France | Dissenting | App. nullified by Court | Dissenting opinion (joint); Declaration (joint); Declaration (joint) |
| Fisheries Jurisdiction | 14 April 1972 | Contentious | UK vs. Iceland | United Kingdom | Iceland | United Kingdom | Majority | Judgment on merits | Separate opinion |
| Fisheries Jurisdiction | 22 November 1971 | Contentious | Germany vs. Iceland | Germany | Iceland | Germany | Majority | Judgment on merits | Declaration |
| Aegean Sea Continental Shelf | 10 August 1976 | Contentious | Greece vs. Turkey | Greece | Turkey | Turkey | Majority | Judgment on jurisdiction | None |
| ICAO Jurisdiction (appeal) | 3 August 1971 | Contentious | India vs. Pakistan | India | Pakistan | Pakistan | Majority | Judgment on jurisdiction | Separate opinion |
| Western Sahara | 3 January 1975 | Advisory | Spain; Mauritania; Morocco; Saharan nomadic tribes | N/A | N/A | Saharan nomadic tribes (self determination) | Majority | Opinion on merits | Separate opinion |
| South Africa in Namibia (South West Africa) | 5 August 1970 | Advisory | South Africa; Namibia; UN | N/A | N/A | Namibia | Majority | Opinion on merits | Separate opinion |
| U.N. Administrative Tribunal (appeal of judgment no. 158) | 28 June 1972 | Advisory | UN, Mohamed Fasla | N/A | N/A | Mohamed Fasla | Majority | Opinion on merits | Separate opinion |

== Beagle Channel Islands dispute ==
Dillard was appointed by Queen Elizabeth II along with four other ICJ judges to a court of arbitration separate from the ICJ in order to mediate the long running territorial dispute between Chile and Argentina. The dispute involved the three tiny and resource rich islands of Lennox, Nueva & Picton. The arbitrators lived in Geneva for six months holding hearings and studying voluminous documents. A unanimous judgment was handed over to Queen Elizabeth II on 2 May 1977 awarding the three channel islands to Chile. The Argentine government, however, repudiated the court's verdict and the two countries moved to the brink of war.

| Court of Arbitration | Class | Parties | Challenger | Defendant | Court favored | Opinion |
|---|---|---|---|---|---|---|
| Beagle Channel Dispute | Binding arbitration | Chile; Argentina | N/A | N/A | Chile | Majority |

== Chairman of Court Rules Committee ==
At the start of Dillard's tenure the court's decision processes were extraordinarily protracted and cumbersome, involving numerous exchanges of individual memoranda, conferences, oral hearings, and repeated circulation of opinions, jointly and individually authored. In order to encourage states to look more often to the ICJ for the resolution of disputes, the court appointed a committee of its judges to simplify its rules of procedure. Dillard served on the committee and became its chairman. The committee's major innovation was to give parties an option to submit a case to a "chamber" of five judges instead of to the full court of fifteen, thereby making possible a more expeditious procedure.

== Legal Adviser to High Commissioner for Germany ==
In April 1950 Dillard, under the auspices of the state department, was placed on active duty in the international section of the Pentagon as Legal Adviser to the High Commissioner for Occupied Germany. In this role, Dillard educated the German Judiciary throughout the American zone on the constitutional framework of U.S. foreign policy. Specifically, his talks analyzed constitutional issues involved in the NATO, Yalta & Potsdam Agreements. He also addressed the issue of public opinion in shaping (U.S.) policy.

== See also ==
- Civil Affairs Staging Area
