= Yang Ling-fu =

Chinese artist (1889–1978)

- 楊令茀
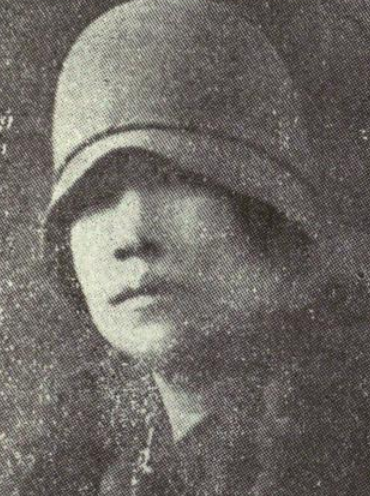
- Yang Ling-fu from a 1936 directory
- Born: December 16, 1889; Wuxi, Jiangsu, China
- Died: September 4, 1978 (aged 88); Carmel, California, US
- Other names: Edith Ling-fu Yang, Edith Young
- Occupations: Artist, poet, curator, educator

Yang Ling-fu (Chinese: 楊令茀, December 16, 1889 – September 4, 1978) was a Chinese artist.

== Early life and education ==
Yang was born in Wuxi, Jiangsu, the daughter of Yang Zhongji, a government official and diplomat. Her older brother, Yang Shounan, was a poet, editor, government official, and industrialist.

Yang won a scholarship to study art in Philadelphia in 1924; she returned to Philadelphia in 1926, in connection with the Philadelphia Exposition of 1926. She also studied and taught in Peking. As a young artist she won medals from presidents Yuan Shikai and Xu Shichang.

== Career ==
Yang was commissioned to make life-sized portraits of Manchu emperors and empresses for the Palace Museum of Mukden in the 1920s. She worked as a curator and was president of the Chinese Academy of Fine Arts. She also wrote novels, poetry, and a book on Chinese cookery.

Yang moved to the United States before World War II. In 1936, she presented an exhibit of Chinese art at the Canadian Jubilee Exposition in Vancouver. She lectured and exhibited her watercolor paintings in California. She taught language, art, and cooking classes in various settings, including at the University of California, Stanford University and the Defense Language Institute at the Presidio in Monterey. She created a set of handmade dolls to illustrate her lectures on Chinese art, and sometimes demonstrated finger painting played a flute, or wore Chinese gowns at her lecture appearances. She also made fundraising appeals for Chinese war relief and refugees. As a poet, she was associated with Poets of the Pacific, a multi-ethnic, multi-national group with an anti-modernist literary emphasis.

== Personal life ==
Yang wrote a memoir, Sketch of Players, in the 1970s, including her oft-told anecdote about sending a pacifist poem to Adolf Hitler. She died in Carmel, California, in 1978.
