= Jacqueline C. Romero =

American lawyer

Jacqueline Romero
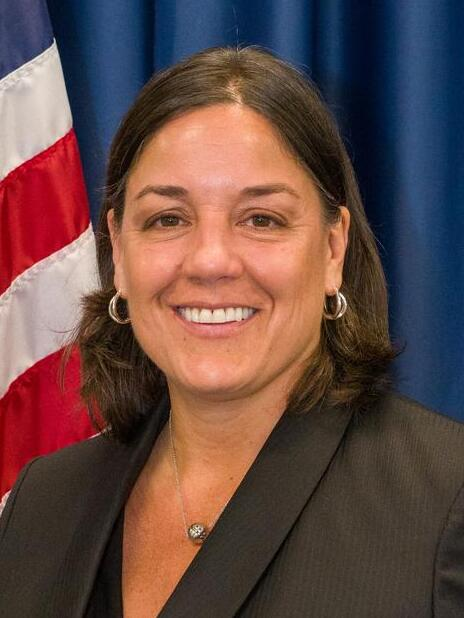

United States Attorney for the Eastern District of Pennsylvania
- In office June 21, 2022 – February 17, 2025
- President: Joe Biden; Donald Trump
- Preceded by: Bill McSwain
- Succeeded by: David Metcalf

Personal details
- Born: 1970 or 1971 (age 55–56)
- Education: College of New Jersey (BA); Rutgers University (JD)

Jacqueline C. Romero (born 1970/1971) is an American lawyer who served as the United States attorney for the Eastern District of Pennsylvania from 2022 to 2025.

== Early life and education ==
Romero grew up in Tenafly, New Jersey, and is the granddaughter of Spanish immigrants. Her grandfather, Diego Romero, was born in La Coruna, Spain, and initially worked as a stonemason. Her grandmother cleaned houses.

The youngest of five children, Romero worked in the family's diner, Romero's Restaurant, where her father was the short-order cook. She was an active reader from an early age and at five years old declared to her parents that someday she would be a judge.

Romero attended Tenafly High School, graduating in 1989.

She earned a Bachelor of Arts degree from Trenton State College (now the College of New Jersey) in 1993 with highest honors.

During college Romero participated in the College Honors Program. As an undergraduate, she was honored by the New Jersey Project in 1991 for outstanding achievement in feminist scholarship for a research paper. Her work has been published in Smart Money magazine.

While in college, Romero was an intern for the Congressional Hispanic Caucus Institute in Washington D.C. and later worked for Rep. Jim McDermott (D-Washington) organizing the 1992 International Congressional Forum on HIV/AIDS.

Romero attended Rutgers Law School Newark as part of the Rutgers’ Minority Student Program. She graduated in 1996 and has credited her at experience at Rutgers with helping her secure her first position as an attorney in 1996 While in law school, Romero was co-founder of the Rutgers Race and the Law Review and Research Editor for the Computer & Technology Law Journal.

== Career ==
=== Lowenstein Sandler ===
Following law school, Romero was hired as an associate at Lowenstein Sandler where she worked from 1996 to 1998.

=== United States Department of Justice ===
In 1998, Romero joined the U.S. Department of Justice as a trial attorney. From 2000 to 2006, she was senior counsel for the United States Mint before being promoted to assistant United States attorney for the Eastern District of Pennsylvania where she remained until 2021.

During her tenure as an attorney for the Department of Justice, Romero was involved in numerous high-profile matters including:

==== United States et al. ex rel. Jean Brasher v. Pentec Health, Inc. ====
In 2013 as an Assistant U.S. Attorney for the Eastern District of Pennsylvania, Romero led a team which brought a qui tam whistleblower lawsuit against Pentec Health. The complaint alleged that the company illegally waived Medicare patients' copay obligations and billed government healthcare programs for substantial amounts of wasted drug ingredients. The charges were settled in 2019 for $17 million.

==== Roy Langbord, et al., Plaintiffs, V. United States Department Of The Treasury, et al., Defendants ====
In 2006, while working as senior counsel to the U.S. Mint, Romero defended a case brought by a family that was in possession of a set of 10 rare “Double Eagle” coins minted in 1933 but never circulated. The family had claimed that after submitting the coins to the U.S. Mint for authentication, the Mint refused to return them stating that the coins had been obtained illegally and were property of the U.S. government. After more than five years of litigation, Romero and her team successfully demonstrated that the coins were property of the U.S. Government and had been stolen from the U.S. Mint in Philadelphia in the 1930s as part of an inside job. The case was decided by a jury in 2011 and the coins, valued at more than $40 million, were returned to the U.S. Mint's bullion depository in Fort Knox, Kentucky. The family were unsuccessful in their appeal.

==== United States et al., ex rel. Jeremy Garrity v. Novartis Pharmaceuticals Corporation ====
Beginning in 2005, Romero was part of a team of government prosecutors pursuing an extensive qui tam action against Novartis Pharmaceuticals under Federal and State False Claims Acts. The U.S. Department of Justice claimed that Novartis paid kickbacks to more than 4,000 health care providers to encourage them to prescribe the drugs Trileptal, Diovan, Exforge, Tekturna, Zelnorm, and Sandostatin. The matter settled in 2010 with Novartis paying $170 million in criminal fine and $15 million in criminal forfeiture for Trileptal. The claims concerning the additional drugs totaled an additional $237.5 million in fines.

=== United States attorney for the Eastern District of Pennsylvania ===
On April 22, 2022, President Joe Biden announced his intent to nominate Romero to serve as the United States attorney for the Eastern District of Pennsylvania. Her nomination was sent to the Senate two days later. On June 9, 2022, her nomination was approved by the Senate Judiciary Committee; Senators Ted Cruz, Josh Hawley and Marsha Blackburn were recorded as voting "Nay". Her nomination was unanimously confirmed in the United States Senate on June 13 and she was sworn into office on June 21, 2022.

On February 17, 2025, Romero announced that she would depart the office. Her announcement came after President Donald Trump ordered the dismissal of all U.S. attorneys appointed by Biden. During her tenure as U.S. Attorney for the Eastern District of Pennsylvania, the region experienced a 40% drop in violent crime.

As a U.S. Attorney, Romero was involved in numerous high-profile matters including:

==== United States of America v. Certain Domains ====
In September 2024, Romero oversaw the seizure of 32 internet domains alleged to have been used by the Russian government as part of a covert online influence scheme to reduce international support for Ukraine and sway the results of the 2024 U.S. presidential election. An FBI affidavit claimed that the seized domains use a mix of AI-generated news stories, advertisements and online influencers posing as U.S. citizens were used in an effort known as "Doppelganger," and orchestrated by a close ally of Russian President Vladimir Putin. The propaganda purposefully obfuscated the Russian government's role in the scheme.

==== United States of America v. John Dougherty, Robert Henon, Brian Burrows, Michael Neill, Marita Crawford, Niko Rodriguez, Brian Fiocca, Anthony Massa ====
In January 2019, a federal grand jury indicted John Dougherty, the long-time business manager of Local 98, as well as seven others affiliated with Local 98, on charges of corruption and embezzlement. Romero brought the case to trial in 2024. The trial which included hundreds of letters of support for Dougherty from political and civic figures including former Pennsylvania Gov. Ed Rendell. Following the trial, Dougherty was convicted and sentenced to six years in prison.

==== United States v Citadel Federal Credit Union (E.D. Penn.) ====
In 2024, Romero resolved claims made against Citadel Federal Credit Union as part of the DOJ's 2021 Combating Redlining Initiative. The charges alleged that Citadel wrote mortgages to homeowners in majority-Black and Hispanic neighborhoods at rates far below that of comparable lenders between 2017 through 2021. The settlement included the payment of more than $6 million in fines and mandated that Citadel open at least three offices to handle mortgages in predominantly Black and Hispanic neighborhoods of Philadelphia.

==== United States v. Essa Bank & Trust (E.D. Pa.) ====
In May 2023, Romero filed a complaint against Essa Bank & Trust under the federal Fair Housing Act alleging that the bank had participated in redlining. According to the complaint, Essa avoided providing home loans and other mortgage services in majority-Black and Hispanic neighborhoods in the Philadelphia-Camden-Wilmington area from 2017 through 2021. After negotiating a settlement with the bank, Romero filed a consent decree with the court the following month. As part of the settlement, the bank was required to invest $2.92 million in a loan subsidy fund designed to increase access to their credit services in majority-Black and Hispanic neighborhoods, including home mortgages and home improvement loans. The bank was also required to spend $125,000 on community partnerships and $250,000 on advertising, outreach, consumer financial education, and credit counseling.

==== United States of America v. Minh Quốc Nguyễn ====
In March 2023, Romero was part of a coordinated, multi-jurisdictional effort to bring down ChipMixer, a cryptocurrency “mixing” service, on charges of money laundering. According to allegations by the Department of Justice, ChipMixer was responsible for laundering more than $3 billion worth of cryptocurrency from 2017 through 2023. The complaint alleged that the service participated in ransomware and other computer hacking schemes. As part of the effort, Minh Quốc Nguyễn of Hanoi, Vietnam, was charged with money laundering, operating an unlicensed money transmitting business and identity theft, connected to the operation of ChipMixer.

==== United States of America ex rel. Wyatt et al. v. BioTek reMEDys, Inc. ====
In 2023, Romero settled a case claiming that BioTek reMEDys paid illegal kickbacks to patients and physicians in violation of the False Claims Act.^{i} Under an agreement with the government, BioTek agreed to pay $20 million for giving doctors free meals, tickets and gifts in order to convince patients to return to BioTek for future medical needs. Prosecutors claimed that BioTek regularly waived co-payments without financial assessments for patients with Medicare and TRICARE, the Defense Department's health plan.

==== Consumer Financial Protection Bureau, and United States v. Trident Mortgage Company (E.D. Pa.) ====
In 2022, Romero, along with prosecutors from NJ and Delaware and attorneys for the CFPB, filed a $20 million consent order in federal court against Trident Mortgage Company. The order accused the company of illegal redlining and lending discrimination in Black and Latino neighborhoods. The settlement terms included the creation of a $18.4 million fund to help minority home-buyers.

=== BakerHostetler ===
In July 2025, Romero joined BakerHostetler as a partner in the firm's litigation practice and a member of the White Collar, Investigations, and Securities Enforcement and Litigation team based in Philadelphia.

== Honors, awards, and recognition ==
- 2024 Fannie Bear Besser Award for Public Service.
- 2024 Hispanic Bar Association of Pennsylvania's La Justicia Award.
- 2024 150 Most Influential Philadelphians (#79)
- 2024 Philadelphia Bar Association “Women Who Inspire”
- 2023 Philadelphia Bar Association, Justice Sonya Sotomayor Award.
- 2023 Peace Islands Institute Annual Public Hero Award.
- 2022 Al Dia Public Service Archetype Award.
- 2022 6ABC Philadelphia Hispanic and Latin American Heritage Month Honoree.
- 2020 Al Dia Top Lawyer Award, Government Category.
- 1993 Trenton State College Office of Hispanic Affairs Award for Academic Excellence.

== Personal life ==
Romero was the first in her family to attend college and the first member of the LGBTQ+ community to hold the position of U.S. Attorney for the Eastern District of Pennsylvania.

Romero served as a president of the Hispanic Bar Association of Pennsylvania and has been a member of the Philadelphia LGBTQ Bar Association.

She was an adjunct law professor at Temple University's Beasley School of Law and served as the president of the Hispanic Bar Association of Pennsylvania.

In 2025 Romero was appointed to the board of trustees of the Philadelphia Bar Foundation.

The Hispanic National Bar Association appointed Romero to a Special Committee on Law Enforcement Reform and Racial Justice.

Romero was elected to the American Law Institute in 2025.
