= Zane David Memeger =

American attorney

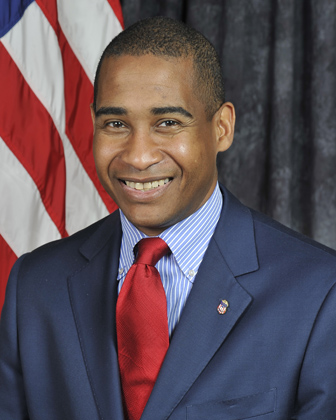

United States Attorney for the Eastern District of Pennsylvania
- In office May 6, 2010 – December 23, 2016
- President: Barack Obama
- Preceded by: Michael L. Levy (acting)
- Succeeded by: Bill McSwain

Personal details
- Born: Zane David Memeger; November 6, 1964 (age 61) Yonkers, New York, U.S.
- Party: Democratic
- Education: James Madison University (B.S.); University of Virginia School of Law (J.D.)

Zane David Memeger (born November 6, 1964) is an American attorney who served as the United States Attorney for the Eastern District of Pennsylvania from 2010 to 2016.

== Education ==
Memeger earned a Bachelor of Science from James Madison University in 1986, and a Juris Doctor from the University of Virginia School of Law in 1991.

== Career ==
Before his appointment as United States Attorney, Memeger was a litigator at Morgan, Lewis & Bockius, first from 1991 to 1995. Memeger resigned from the firm to serve as Assistant United States attorney in the Eastern District of Pennsylvania from 1995 to 2006. Memger then returned to Morgan, Lewis & Bockius as a partner from 2006 to 2010, focusing on white collar criminal defense, corporate investigations, and healthcare fraud investigations. Since June 2025, he has been appointed Executive Director of the Pennsylvania Innocence Project.

== Personal life ==
Memeger was born in Yonkers, New York and grew up in Wilmington, Delaware. He now lives in Philadelphia.
