= David Metcalf =

United States attorney for the Eastern District of Pennsylvania

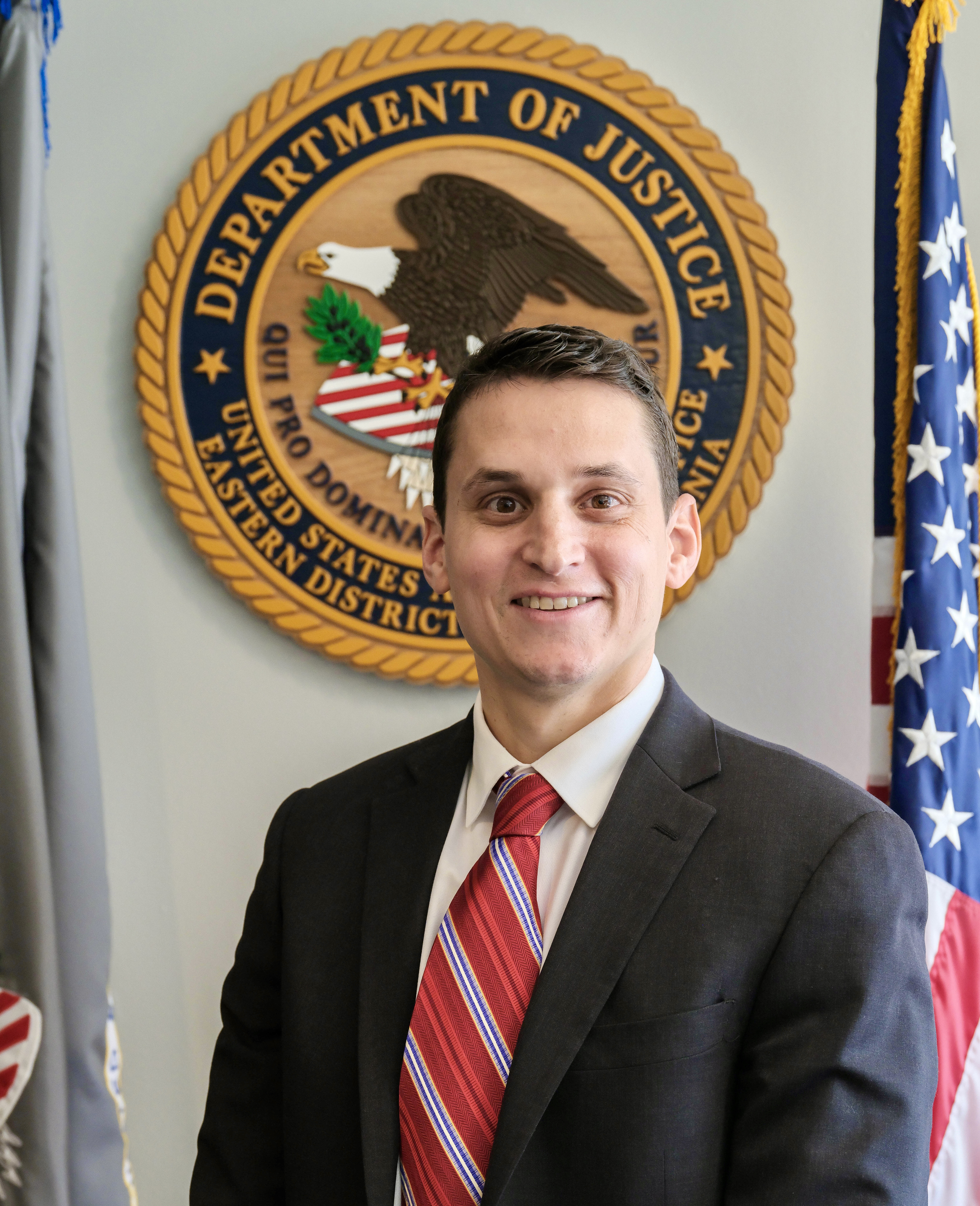
- Born: 1986 (age 39–40)
- Education: Wakefield School
- Alma mater: Princeton University; University of Virginia (Law)
- Occupation: Lawyer
- Years active: c. 2012–

U.S. Attorney for the Eastern District of Pennsylvania
- Incumbent
- Assumed office March 12, 2025; Interim: March 12, 2025 – June 30, 2025
- Nominated by: Donald Trump
- Preceded by: Jacqueline C. Romero

David Metcalf (born 1986) is an American lawyer who has served as the U.S. Attorney for the Eastern District of Pennsylvania since 2025.

== Early life and education ==
Metcalf grew up in Northern Virginia and matriculated from Wakefield School. He went to Princeton University to play collegiate soccer for the varsity men's soccer team, earning 1st Team All-Ivy Academic Honors, and graduated with a Bachelor of Arts (Honors). Metcalf received his Juris Doctor from the University of Virginia School of Law, where he served as an editor of the Virginia Law Review and graduated Order of the Coif.

== Career ==
Metcalf was a law clerk to Judge Albert Diaz of the United States Court of Appeals for the Fourth Circuit from 2012 to 2013; and was then an associate lawyer for the Washington D.C. firm Covington & Burling, LLP.

Metcalf joined the Department of Justice in 2015 as an Assistant U.S. Attorney for the District of Maryland, where he received an award for the Excellence in the Prosecution of Organized Crime and served as Deputy Chief of Appeals.

=== United States Attorney ===
Metcalf was nominated as U.S. Attorney by President Donald J. Trump on March 11, 2025; and before the Senate approved his nomination, the United States District Court for the Eastern District of Pennsylvania appointed Metcalf to the position effective June 24, 2025.

As U.S. Attorney, Metcalf was assigned significant national security investigations and has overseen the prosecution of white-collar offenses, including a $770-million Ponzi scheme. In 2025, Metcalf filed charges in what he described as "the largest federal indictment this century" in the Eastern District of Pennsylvania, charging 33 defendants in a drug-trafficking conspiracy based in Philadelphia. In September 2025, Metcalf announced that the Department of Justice had filed a civil complaint against ProMedica Health System, alleging that several of its nursing facilities provided "grossly substandard" care in violation of the Nursing Home Reform Act.
