= Bill McSwain =

American attorney (born 1969)

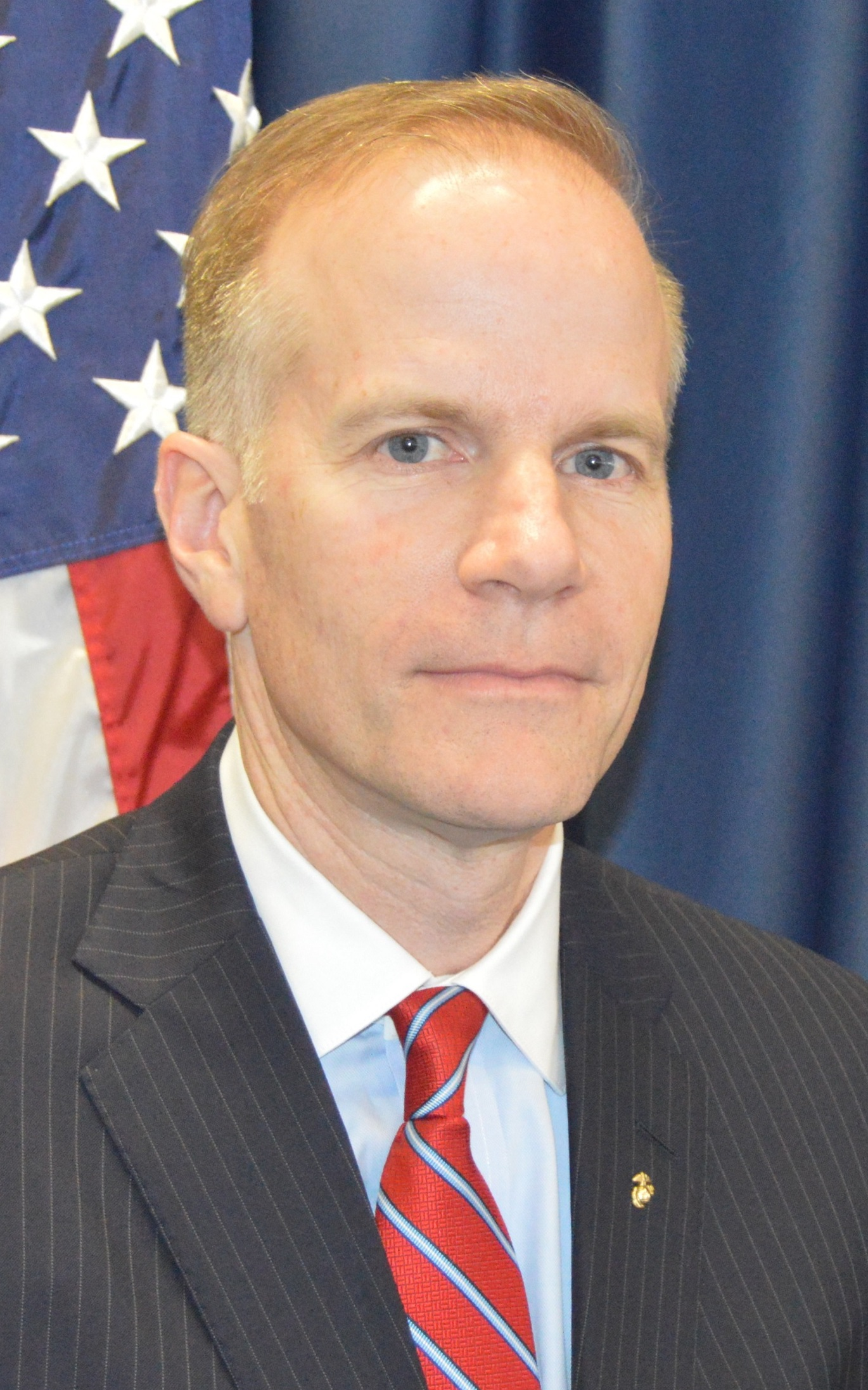

United States Attorney for the Eastern District of Pennsylvania
- In office April 6, 2018 – January 22, 2021
- President: Donald Trump; Joe Biden
- Preceded by: Zane David Memeger
- Succeeded by: Jennifer Williams (acting); Jacqueline C. Romero

Personal details
- Born: William Miller McSwain; April 3, 1969 (age 57) Philadelphia, Pennsylvania, U.S.
- Party: Republican (2004–present)
- Other political affiliations: Democratic (before 2004)
- Education: Yale University (BA); Harvard University (JD)

Military service
- Allegiance: United States
- Branch/service: United States Marine Corps
- Years of service: 1993–1997
- Rank: First Lieutenant
- Unit: 1st Battalion, 4th Marines
- Awards: Navy and Marine Corps Achievement Medal; National Defense Service Medal; Armed Forces Expeditionary Medal; Sea Service Deployment Ribbon

William Miller McSwain (born 1969) is an American attorney and a former United States Attorney for the Eastern District of Pennsylvania, a position he held from April 6, 2018 to January 22, 2021. He was nominated to the post by President Donald Trump. After leaving his position as U.S. Attorney, McSwain entered private practice at Duane Morris LLP. He then ran, unsuccessfully, for the Republican nomination for Governor of Pennsylvania in 2022 after which he again returned to private practice.

== Early life, education, and legal career ==
McSwain graduated from Yale University in 1991. After graduating from Yale, he spent four years in the U.S. Marine Corps as an infantry officer. He commanded a platoon in that role. In 2000, he graduated from Harvard Law School, where he was an editor of the Harvard Law Review.

From 2003 to 2006, McSwain was an Assistant U.S. Attorney in the U.S. Attorney's Office for the Eastern District of Pennsylvania; the district, based in Philadelphia, covers nine counties (Philadelphia, Montgomery, Delaware, Chester, Berks, Bucks, Lancaster, Lehigh, and Northampton). In 2006, McSwain left the U.S. Attorney's Office to join the law firm Drinker, Biddle & Reath in Center City, Philadelphia. His work principally focused on business litigation and white-collar defense matters, but he attracted attention among Pennsylvania Republicans for representing conservative litigants in cases over issues such as the Boy Scouts of America's exclusion of gay scout leaders and the preservation of the Ten Commandments plaque at the Chester County Courthouse. He was successful in both cases. In published letters, McSwain defended George W. Bush-era "enhanced interrogation techniques" and, in 2016, criticized football player Colin Kaepernick as "uninformed and hypocritical" for his national anthem protests.

== Tenure as U.S. Attorney ==
=== Nomination ===
President Donald Trump nominated McSwain to be the United States Attorney for the Eastern District of Pennsylvania, and the nomination was received in the Senate on December 21, 2017. On March 15, 2018, his nomination was reported out of the Senate Judiciary Committee by voice vote. On March 20, 2018, the Senate confirmed McSwain's nomination by voice vote. He was sworn in on April 6, 2018.

=== Tenure ===
During his time as U.S. Attorney, McSwain's public office spent $75,138 to put his face on four billboards in Philadelphia, as well as Allentown and Lancaster. The billboards had the slogan "Gun crime = fed time, no parole, every time," with McSwain's face taking up a third of the space on each billboard. The move was controversial because of the likelihood that the advertising would increase his name recognition and face recognition, and aid McSwain's political ambitions.

McSwain sued to prevent the opening of a supervised injection site to be called "Safehouse" whose supporters believed it would prevent opioid overdose deaths in Philadelphia. The concept of a safe injection site was received with both opposition and support, with 90% of surveyed residents and 63% of business owners and employees in Kensington, the neighborhood of Philadelphia hardest hit by the opioid epidemic, approving the measure. However, a swath of Kensington residents felt “blindsided” by the proposal to introduce safe injection sites and questioned the legitimacy of the survey and whether its methods were scientific. McSwain contended that the 1986 federal "crack house statute" prohibited the establishment of supervised injection sites. He originally lost his case in U.S. District Court, but won on appeal in a 2–1 decision of the U.S. Court of Appeals for the Third Circuit issued on January 12, 2021. Judge Stephanos Bibas, writing for the majority, held that the 1986 law barred the proposal and that "Safehouse's benevolent motive makes no difference." Citing Gonzales v. Raich, the majority also held that "even though this drug use will happen locally and Safehouse will welcome visitors for free, its safe-injection site falls within Congress's power to ban interstate commerce in drugs." Judge Jane Richards Roth dissented, "calling the logic behind the ruling 'absurd' and the 30-year-old statute on which it was based — one meant to go after owners and tenants of drug dens — 'nearly incomprehensible.'" In September 2023, the Philadelphia City Council voted to ban supervised injection sites in the City. In April 2024, the United States District Court for the Eastern District of Pennsylvania dismissed the case, on the grounds that the Free Exercise Clause does not apply for the creation of supervised injection sites.

As U.S. Attorney, McSwain often publicly feuded with Philadelphia District Attorney Larry Krasner and Philadelphia Mayor Jim Kenney, both Democrats. McSwain called Krasner "soft on crime" and blamed Krasner and his office for a lack of "robust enforcement". The assessments stemmed from Krasner's decision, with Kenny's support, to alter prosecutorial procedure amidst claims of "systemic racism" in the criminal justice system. McSwain further accused him of "lawlessness" and ignoring "entire sections of the criminal code" after controversial decisions to not prosecute certain crimes, such as non-violent drug offenses. He further criticized the D.A.'s office for downgrading charges during prosecutions. McSwain later said that his office had been "picking up the slack" for Krasner and that the U.S. Attorney's Office had prosecuted 70% more violent crime cases than it did the year before Krasner took office due to the latter's "lawlessness." In an interview, in response to rising violent crime rates in Philadelphia, McSwain described the DA's policies as a failed "radical criminal justice experiment on the local level." Upon the announcement of his resignation on January 14, 2021, the District Attorney's office issued a statement saying they hope McSwain's successor has a sense of "humanity."

McSwain criticized Krasner for approving a plea deal with a man who shot and gravely wounded a West Philadelphia shop owner with an AK-47 in the course of an attempted robbery. The plea deal entailed a state sentence of 3½ to 10 years in prison. McSwain's office prosecuted the man separately, under the doctrine of dual sovereignty, and obtained a federal conviction and sentence of 14 years for the shooter.

McSwain pursued federal charges against Black Lives Matter activists who clashed with police by committing arson of police vehicles, in one case described as the “torching” of police cars during unrest in the summer of 2020.

=== Resignation ===
On January 14, 2021, McSwain announced his resignation, just six days short of the presidential inauguration of Joe Biden. He left office on January 22.

== 2022 gubernatorial campaign ==
In March 2021, McSwain formed a political action committee, Freedom PA, to commence his bid for Pennsylvania Governor in 2022.

In June 2021, while McSwain was preparing for a bid for Governor of Pennsylvania and vying for Trump's endorsement, McSwain sent a letter to Trump that said his office "received various allegations of voter fraud and election irregularities" and that then-Attorney General William Barr instructed McSwain “not to make any public statements or put out any press releases regarding possible election irregularities,” and also directed McSwain “to pass along serious allegations to the State Attorney General for investigation.” There is no evidence of significant fraud in the 2020 election. Barr disputed McSwain's characterization of his actions and said that McSwain was making these claims to get Trump's support. Trump later called McSwain a "coward" for not acting on his false claims of "massive election fraud" in Philadelphia. Trump also said he would not endorse McSwain in the governor's race and later endorsed Pennsylvania State Senator Doug Mastriano instead.

McSwain officially launched his gubernatorial campaign on September 13, 2021. He ran on a platform labeling himself a "conservative outsider" and pledging to lower regulations and taxes and address public safety issues. He supported eliminating no-excuse mail voting and supported voter ID laws. On abortion McSwain said that, if elected, he would be a pro-life governor, but would support exceptions for rape, incest, and protecting the life of the mother. During his campaign, he criticized some stances of an LGBT group sponsored by the Gender Sexuality Alliance (“GSA”) at a Pennsylvania middle school as “left-wing indoctrination.”

McSwain came in third in the Republican primary race with 15.77% of the vote behind Mastriano (43.83%) and former Congressman Lou Barletta (20.25%), carrying Chester County in the election and finished second to Mastriano in a majority of Pennsylvania’s 67 counties.

He subsequently rejoined the law firm Duane Morris LLP, where he serves as the Co-Chair of the White Collar and Government Investigations Divisions.

Legal offices
Preceded by Zane David Memeger	United States Attorney for the Eastern District of Pennsylvania; 2018–2021	Succeeded by Jennifer Williams; Acting
