= ChipMixer =

Cryptocurrency laundering service

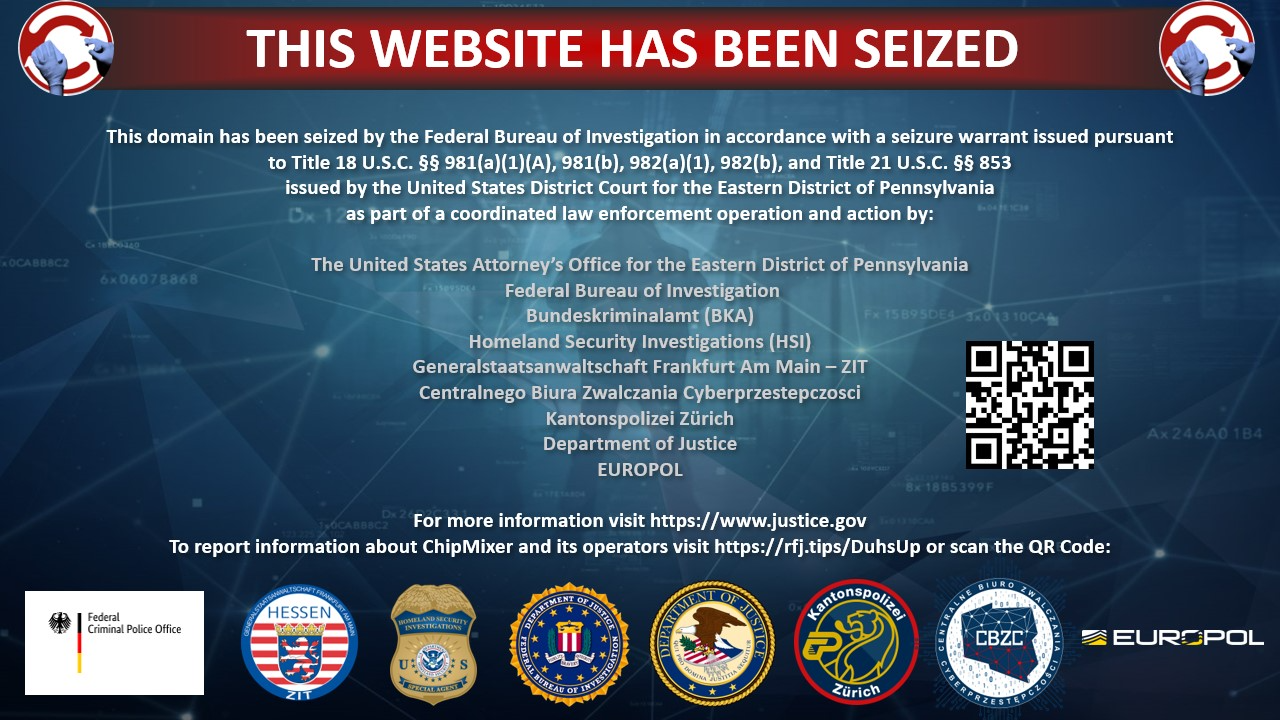
- Website type: Cryptocurrency tumbler
- Available in: English
- Country of origin: Vietnam
- Commercial: Yes
- Launched: 2017
- Current status: Defunct

ChipMixer was a cryptocurrency laundering service operated out of Vietnam from servers run in Germany. The service was allegedly used to launder more than three billion dollars US over a period of six years, before being shut down in 2023.

== Service ==
The service allowed customers to obfuscate the origin of cryptocurrency transactions. This anonymization was useful for criminals who used the service when purchasing illicit goods from darknet markets. Additionally, criminals needing to hide the origins of ransomware payouts used the site.

== Seizure ==
The website and backend servers were seized by the Bundespolizei, Federal Bureau of Investigation, Homeland Security Investigations, and Europol on March 15, 2023. The German police seized 46 million dollars in cryptocurrency.

The United States Department of Justice claimed that ChipMixer was responsible for laundering more than $3 billion worth of cryptocurrency from 2017 through 2023. In a complaint filed in the Eastern District Of Pennsylvania, the FBI alleged that the service participated in ransomware and other computer hacking schemes. As part of the effort, Minh Quốc Nguyễn of Hanoi, Vietnam, was charged with money laundering, operating an unlicensed money transmitting business and identity theft, connected to the operation of ChipMixer.

== See also ==
- Blender.io
