= Blender.io =

Cryptocurrency mixer

- Website type: Cryptocurrency mixer
- Founded: 2017
- Dissolved: 2022
- Successor: Sinbad.io
- Services: Cryptocurrency mixing
- Launched: 2017
- Current status: Defunct

Blender.io was a cryptocurrency mixer that was established in 2017. In 2022, it was sanctioned by the Office of Foreign Assets Control of the U.S. Department of the Treasury for allegedly aiding the Lazarus Group, a hacking group associated with the government of North Korea. The Treasury Department stated that this was the first sanction that they had imposed on a cryptocurrency mixer.

The US Treasury Department's Office of Foreign Assets Control said Blender.io helped transmit over $500 million in bitcoin since 2017, when it had been created. The Treasury also said it had been involved in laundering $20.5 million in proceeds from the Lazarus Group's Axie Infinity cryptocurrency heist. According to a 2025 press release by the US Justice Department, Blender.io operated until approximately 2022.

According to the Office of Foreign Assets Control, Sinbad.io was a successor to Blender.io. Sinbad.io was sanctioned on November 29, 2023, also for being a "key money-laundering tool" of the Lazarus Group, and Sinbad.io servers were seized in the Netherlands and Finland.

== See also ==
- Tornado Cash
- ChipMixer
