= Citadel Credit Union =

Credit union in Pennsylvania, U.S.

- Type: Credit union
- Industry: Financial services
- Founded: 1937; 89 years ago
- Headquarters: Exton, Chester County, Pennsylvania, Pennsylvania, United States
- Area served: Bucks, Chester, Delaware, Montgomery, Lancaster, and Philadelphia Counties in Pennsylvania
- Products: Savings; checking; consumer loans; mortgages; credit cards; online banking; Savings;Money market account;Wealth management
- Total assets: $5B USD (2023)
- Website: www.citadelbanking.com

Citadel Credit Union is an American credit union headquartered in Exton, Chester County, Pennsylvania.

Citadel serves Bucks, Chester, Delaware, Lancaster, Montgomery, and Philadelphia counties with 24 branch locations in Southeastern Pennsylvania. It is chartered and regulated under the authority of the National Credit Union Administration (NCUA). Citadel offers banking and retirement and wealth management. Citadel provides services to more than 200,000 customers.

As of 2020, it was the fourth largest credit union in Pennsylvania. It is the second largest credit union in the Greater Philadelphia area.

== History ==
Citadel was founded in 1937 in Coatesville, Pennsylvania by Lukens Steel employees as the Lukens Employee Federal Credit Union.

In 2005, Citadel acquired Atlantic Credit Union of Newtown Square, Pennsylvania. The merger grew Citadel to an almost $1 billion credit union.

In 2006, the NCUA granted Citadel the right to expand its charter into Bucks, Delaware, Lancaster, Philadelphia, and Montgomery counties.

In 2011, Citadel moved its corporate headquarters to Exton, Pennsylvania from Thorndale, Pennsylvania. The company continued to be ranked 2nd in assets among credit unions in the Philadelphia area.

== Redlining Allegations and Settlement ==
The U.S. Department of Justice (DOJ) filed a complaint in the District Court in Pennsylvania that alleged Citadel failed to provided mortgage lending services to majority Black and Hispanic neighborhoods in Philadelphia between 2017 and 2021, a practice known as Redlining. It was found that only 3% of HMDA-reportable residential mortgage loans were to residents of majority Black and Hispanic areas; during the same time similar institutions' rate was 10%. In October 2024 Citadel and the DOJ reached a settlement agreement, which included Citadel agreeing to invest $6 million into a Loan Subsidy Fund to increase access to resident based loans for majority Black and Hispanic neighborhoods. The requirement to open three new branches in predominantly Black and Hispanic neighborhoods in Philadelphia and Citadel would be required to retain independent consultants to enhance its fair lending program.
