= U.S. Coast Guard Great Lakes District =

United States Coast Guard district

Department of Homeland Security United States Coast Guard
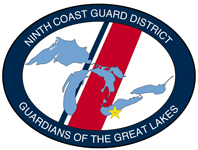
- United States Coast Guard Great Lakes Icon
- Country: United States of America
- Branch: United States Coast Guard
- Size: 6,000+
- Part of: Atlantic Area
- Garrison/HQ: Cleveland, Ohio (Anthony J. Celebrezze Federal Building)
- Nickname: Guardians of the Great Lakes
- Mottos: Semper Paratus (Always Ready)
- Website: atlanticarea.uscg.mil

Commanders
- District Commander: RADM Jonathan P. Hickey
- Chief of Staff: CAPT Brad W. Kelly
- Command Master Chief: MCPO Christopher E. Mullins

United States Coast Guard Great Lakes District (formerly District 9) is a United States Coast Guard district, based at the Anthony J. Celebrezze Federal Building, in Cleveland, Ohio. U.S. Coast Guard Great Lakes is responsible for all Coast Guard operations on the five Great Lakes, the Saint Lawrence Seaway, and surrounding states accumulating 6,700 miles of shoreline and 1,500 miles of international shoreline with Canada.

== Command and Duties ==
Led by RADM Jonathan P. Hickey, United States Coast Guard Great Lakes District includes 6,000 active duty, reserve, and civilian personnel. Great Lakes District predominantly serves duties such as search and rescue, maritime safety and security, environmental protection, maritime law enforcement, aids to navigation, and icebreaking.

== Operations ==
One major role for the Coast Guard in the Great Lakes region is to perform ice-breaking duties to enable shipping to have free mobility throughout the region. One of the major ports to be kept operational is Duluth, Minnesota.

Another major role is maintenance of navigational buoys. As of October 2021, the Coast Guard began implementing plans to replace all existing metal buoys with new high-tech foam buoys, which would not need to be serviced or removed annually.

In October 2021, the National Center of Expertise for the Great Lakes was formally inaugurated as a new operational unit within the United States Coast Guard. Amongst its duties are to perform scientific research on oil spills that occur in freshwater. U.S. Senator Gary Peters of Michigan said that Senate hearings had revealed that the Coast Guard was largely unprepared for handling oil spills in that region, and also that there was little scientific knowledge about how to clean up oil spills in freshwater; this was one major reason for creating this new research center. The Center was set up as a joint project between the Coast Guard and the Lake Superior State University in Sault Ste. Marie, which would also host the Great Lakes Environmental Research Laboratory in Ann Arbor. The center would also be managed by the NOAA's Great Lakes Environmental Research Laboratory. The legislation to establish this center was enacted in 2018.

== History ==
The history of Coast Guard operations in the Great Lakes region began with the operational activity by one of the predecessor agencies to the Coast Guard, the U.S. Revenue Cutter Service. This organization's service in the region began around the 1820s. when its role included stopping smugglers, and assisting boaters in distress. Another predecessor agency, the U.S. Lighthouse Service is believed to have begun operations in the region around 1816; by the 1860s, the number of lightships active in the region was 72 ships. The U.S. Life-Saving Service, another predecessor agency, began operations in the region in 1854, after a major storm sparked official efforts to increase the personnel and active units available for lifesaving services.

The fourth of the predecessor agencies was the U.S. Steamboat Inspection Service. Relatively little historical documentation exists for this agency; however by 1911, it was filling an important role in the region, inspecting steamships for faulty equipment and machinery that might pose any threat to safety of steam vessels.

In 1915, the U.S. Lifesaving Service and the Revenue Cutter Service were merged to form the U.S. Coast Guard. In 1920, the enactment of Prohibition gave the Coast Guard a new role in halting smugglers of alcohol who tried to travel from Canada to the United States with illegal alcoholic beverages.

== Sectors ==
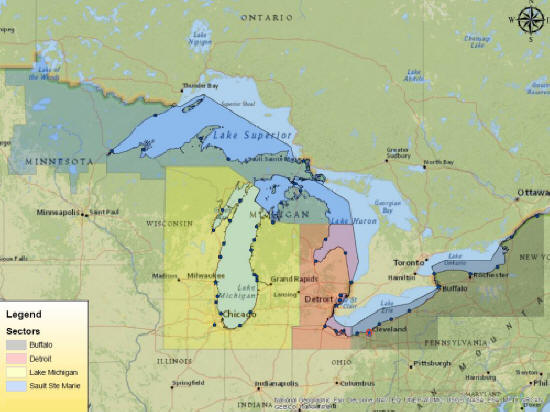
U.S. Coast Guard Great Lakes Sector Map

U.S. Coast Guard Great Lakes is further subdivided into several sectors. These include:

- Sector Eastern Great Lakes (Buffalo, New York)
- Sector Detroit (Detroit, Michigan)
- Sector Northern Great Lakes (Sault Sainte Marie, Michigan)
- Sector Lake Michigan (Milwaukee, Wisconsin)
- Sector Field Office (SFO) Grand Haven (Grand Haven, Michigan)

=== Stations ===
U.S. Coast Guard Great Lakes is constructed of 48 active stations located in New York, Pennsylvania, Ohio, Michigan, Illinois, and Wisconsin, Indiana and Minnesota.

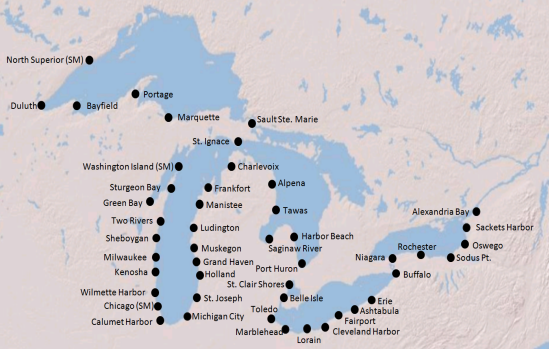
U.S. Coast Guard Great Lakes Stations Map

Sector Eastern Great Lakes Stations

- Station Alexandria Bay: Wellesley Island, New York
- Station Ashtabula: Ashtabula, Ohio
- Station Buffalo: Buffalo, New York
- Station Cleveland Harbor/Station Small Lorain: Cleveland, Ohio
- Station Erie: Erie, Pennsylvania
- Station Fairport: Grand River, Ohio
- Station Niagara: Youngstown, New York
- Station Oswego: Oswego, New York
- Station Rochester: Rochester, New York
- Station Sackets Harbor (AUXOP): Sackets Harbor, New York
- Station Sodus Point: Sodus Point, New York

Sector Detroit Stations

- Station Belle Isle: Detroit, Michigan
- Station Harbor Beach: Harbor Beach, Michigan
- Station Marblehead: Marblehead, Ohio
- Station Port Huron: Port Huron, Michigan
- Station Saginaw River: Essexville, Michigan
- Station St. Clair Shores: St. Clair Shores, Michigan
- Station Tawas: East Tawas, Michigan
- Station Toledo: Toledo, Ohio

Sector Lake Michigan Stations

- Station Calumet Harbor: Chicago, Illinois
- Station Chicago (Small): Chicago, Illinois
- Station Frankfort: Frankfort, Michigan
- Station Grand Haven: Grand Haven, Michigan
- Station Green Bay (AUXOP): Green Bay, Wisconsin
- Station Holland (AUXOP): Holland, Michigan
- Station (ANT) Kenosha: Kenosha, Wisconsin
- Station Ludington: Ludington, Michigan
- Station Manistee: Manistee, Michigan
- Station Michigan City: Michigan City, Indiana
- Station Milwaukee: Milwaukee, Wisconsin
- Station (ANT) Muskegon: Muskegon, Michigan
- Station Sheboygan: Sheboygan, Wisconsin
- Station St. Joseph: St. Joseph, Michigan
- Station Sturgeon Bay: Sturgeon Bay, Wisconsin
- Station (ANT) Two Rivers: Two Rivers, Wisconsin
- Station Washington Island (Small): Sturgeon Bay, Wisconsin
- Station Wilmette: Wilmette, Illinois

Sector Northern Great Lakes Stations

- Station Alpena (AUXOP): Alpena, Michigan
- Station Bayfield: Bayfield, Wisconsin
- Station Charlevoix: Charlevoix, Michigan
- Station Duluth: Duluth, Minnesota
- Station Marquette: Marquette, Michigan
- Station North Superior (Small): Grand Marais, Minnesota
- Station Portage: Dollar Bay, Michigan
- Station Sault Ste Marie: Sault Sainte Marie, Michigan
- Station St. Ignace: St. Ignace, Michigan

== Air Stations ==
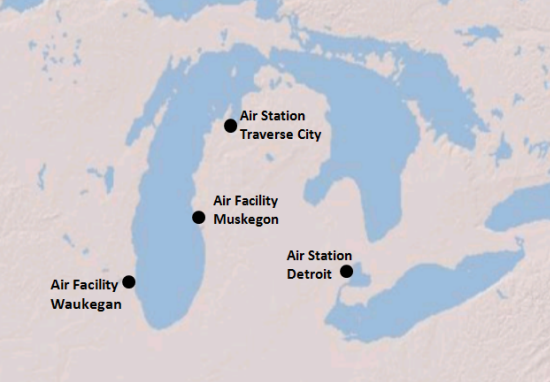
U.S. Coast Guard Great Lakes Air Stations Map

- Air Station Detroit is located on Selfridge Air National Guard Base near Detroit, Michigan. Primary missions include Search and Rescue, Law Enforcement, domestic icebreaking operations, Marine Environmental Protection (MEP), Rotary Wing Air Intercept (RWAI) and mission support for local, state, and federal agencies. Air Station Detroit is responsible for the southern portion of Lake Huron, Lake St. Clair, Lake Erie, and Lake Ontario.

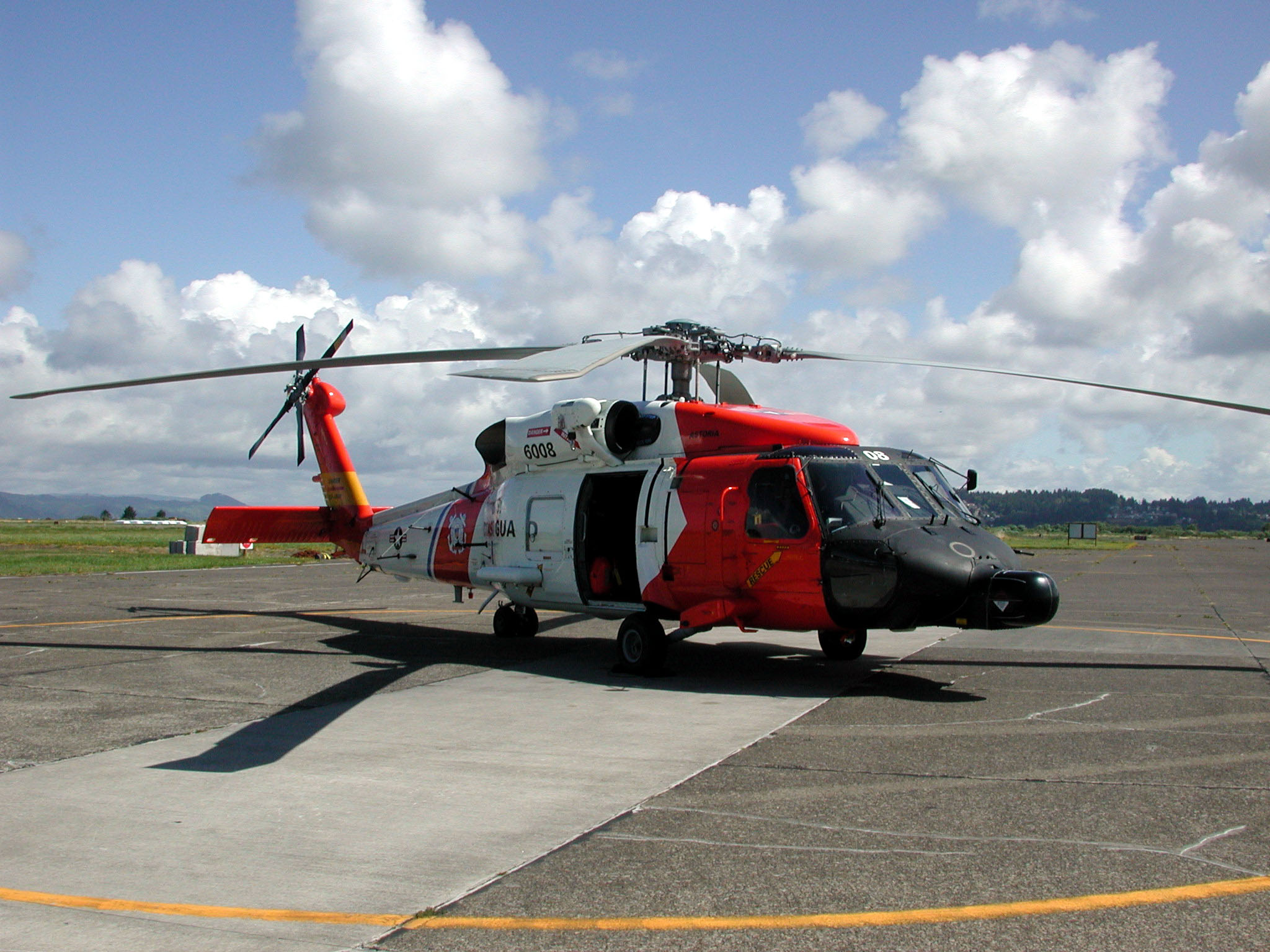
Sikorsky MH-60

- Air Facility Muskegon is a detachment of Air Station Detroit. The air facility operates during the summer months to support the southwest portion of Lake Michigan. The air facility is staffed by two four-person aircrews operating a MH-65D Dolphin Helicopter.
- Air Station Traverse City is located at the Cherry Capital Airport in Traverse City, Michigan. Air Station Traverse City operates all of Lake Michigan and a large portion of Lake Superior and Lake Huron. Primary missions include Homeland Security, Law Enforcement, and Search and Rescue. Air Station Traverse City has transitioned from four MH-65 Dolphin helicopters to their current three Sikorsky MH-60 Jayhawk helicopters. Air Station Traverse City is commanded by Commanding Officer Andrew Schanno and Command Master Chief Bradford Young.
- Air Facility Waukegan, previously known as Air Station Chicago, now operates in Waukegan, Illinois at the Waukegan Regional Airport. The air facility operates from Memorial Day through Labor Day to increase search and rescue capabilities and improve response times in Southern Lake Michigan. The air facility is staffed by two four-person aircrews operating a MH-65D Dolphin Helicopter.

== Cutters ==
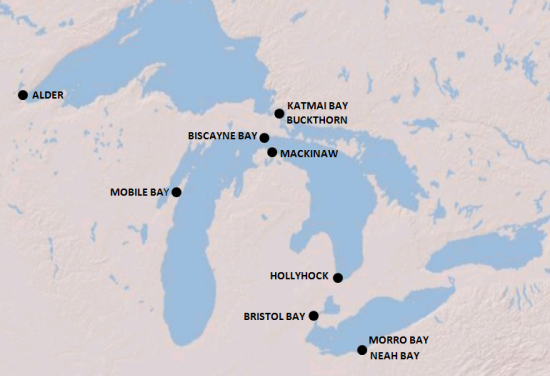
U.S. Coast Guard Great Lakes Cutter Map

U.S. Coast Guard Great Lakes has ten active cutters operating in all five Great Lakes. Cutter is a term used by the U.S. Coast Guard for its commissioned vessels. They are 65 feet (19.8 m) or greater in length and have a permanently assigned crew with accommodations aboard. They carry the ship prefix USCGC.

Due to the requirement of Rush–Bagot Treaty, the cutters assigned to the Great Lakes are minimally armed, save for a few machine guns.

- USCGC Spar (WLB-206) is a 225-foot multi-mission cutter located in Duluth, Minnesota after switching home ports with her sister ship, USCGC Alder (WLB-216). Its primary missions are to aid in navigation, ice breaking, law enforcement, and search and rescue. In addition, Spar performs missions such as marine environmental protection and port security. Spar operates on all five Great Lakes, however, most of its operations are in Lake Superior and Lake Michigan.
- USCGC Biscayne Bay (WTGB-104) is a 140-foot icebreaking tug stationed in Saint Ignace, Michigan. Its primary mission is to maintain tracks in the connecting waterways in the Great Lakes and assist vessels through icebound shipping lanes. Biscayne Bay operates widely throughout the great lakes. Primary areas of operation are the Straits of Mackinac and the St. Mary's River. In addition, the cutter operates in the St. Clair/Detroit River system, Green Bay, Wisconsin, Duluth, Minnesota, and Thunder Bay, Ontario.
- USCGC Bristol Bay (WTGB-103} is a 140-foot icebreaking tug stationed in Detroit, Michigan. Its primary responsibility is opening and maintaining icebound shipping lanes in the Great Lakes. In addition, Bristol Bay performs missions such as search and rescue, marine environmental protection, law enforcement, and port security and safety. U.S. Coast Guard engineers designed Bristol Bay.

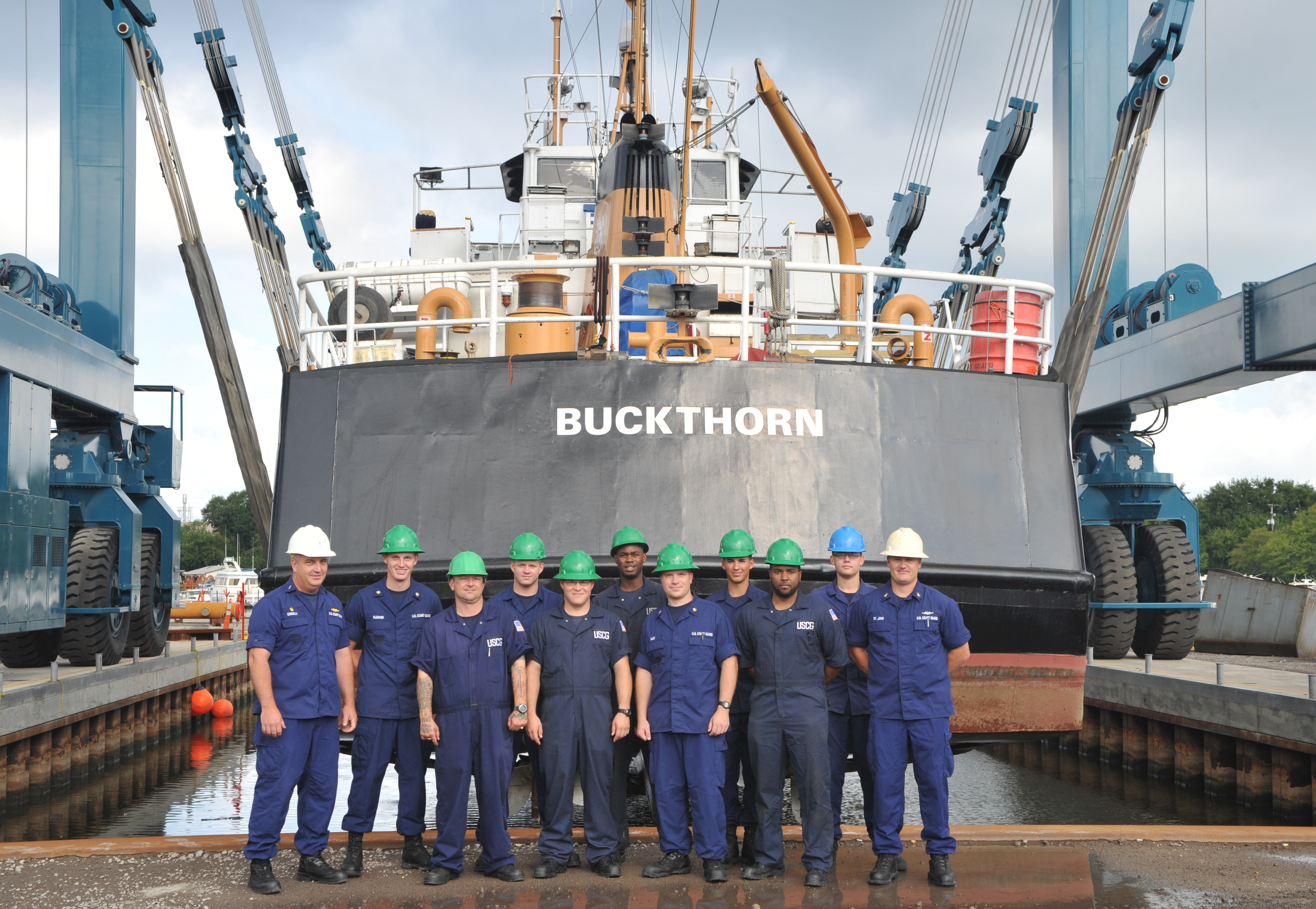
USCGC Buckthorn

- USCGC Buckthorn (WLI-642) is a 100-foot inland buoy tender stationed in Sault Ste. Marie, Michigan. Its primary missions are aids-to-navigation within the Sault Ste Marie's River System, homeland security, and public affairs. Buckthorn's area of responsibility expands from Whitefish Point, Michigan thru Sault Ste Marie's River. Buckthorn is the oldest cutter in the Great Lakes.
- USCGC Hollyhock (WLB-214) is a 225-foot seagoing buoy tender stationed in Port Huron, Michigan. It is responsible for approximately 150 aids-to-navigation on mainly Lake Huron, Lake Michigan, and Lake Erie. Hollyhock other primary missions include search and rescue, environmental protection, and domestic ice-breaking. Hollyhock was built in 2003 to replace WWII-era USCGC Bramble (WLB-392).
- USCGC Katmai Bay (WTGB-101) is a 140-foot Bay-class icebreaking tug stationed in Sault Sainte Marie, Michigan. Its primary missions include icebreaking, homeland security patrols, lighthouse projects, law enforcement, and public affairs. Katmai Bay operates within all Great Lakes.

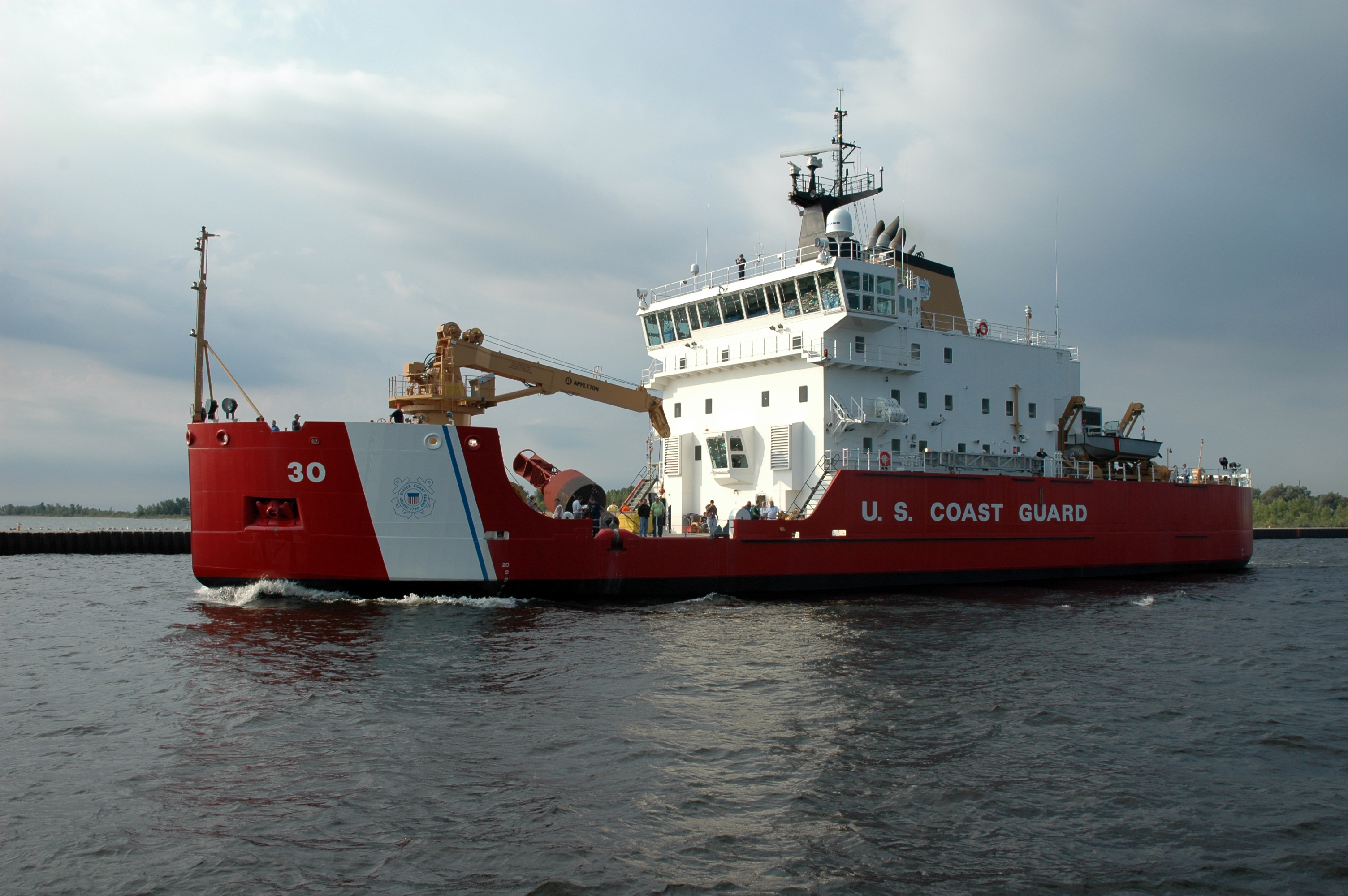
USCGC Mackinaw

- USCGC Mackinaw (WLBB-30) is a 240-foot vessel stationed in Cheboygan, Michigan. It is the only U.S. Coast Guard cutter in the Great Lakes designed for heavy icebreaking and specifically used for multi-mission capabilities, such as environmental response, homeland security, and search and rescue. Mackinaw contains state of the art technology such as its ability to deploy an oil skimming system to respond to oil spill incidents.
- USCGC Mobile Bay (WTGB-103) is a 140-foot vessel designed for icebreaking and is stationed in Sturgeon Bay, Wisconsin. Mobile Bay conducts icebreaking missions near Green Bay, Wisconsin, Straits of Mackinac, and the St. Mary's River from mid-December through mid-April. Its other missions include maritime law enforcement, search and rescue, environmental pollution response, and homeland security.
- USCGC Morro Bay (WTGB-106) is a 140-foot Bay-class icebreaking tug stationed in Cleveland, Ohio. Its primary missions include icebreaking, homeland security patrols, lighthouse projects, law enforcement, and public affairs. Morro Bay operates within all Great Lakes and has coined the nickname, "Jack of all trades".
- USCGC Neah Bay (WTBG-105) is a 140-foot Bay-class icebreaking tug stationed in Cleveland, Ohio. Its primary missions include icebreaking, homeland security patrols, light house projects, law enforcement, and public affairs. Neah Bay operates broadly within all Great Lakes.

== Marine Safety Units ==
U.S. Coast Guard Great Lakes comprises four Marine Safety Units (MSU) and two Marine Safety Detachments (MSD).

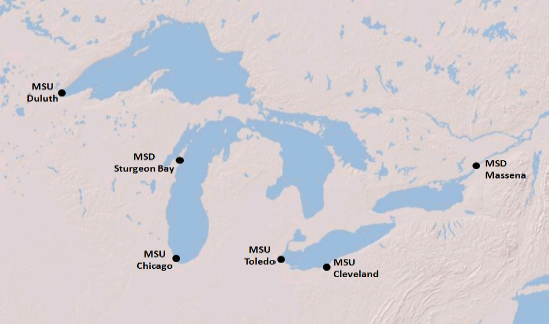
U.S. Coast Guard Great Lakes Marine Safety Units and Detachments Map

- MSU Chicago is in Willowbrook, Illinois; 40 minutes from downtown Chicago, Illinois, its primary responsibilities are Port Safety and Security, Marine Environmental Protection, and Commercial Vessel Safety. These missions serve to ensure safe, secure, and environment safety within Southern Lake Michigan, Chicago Area Waterway System and the Illinois River Watershed. Specifically, MSU Chicago's area of operation is Lake Michigan shorelines of Illinois and Indiana, as well as 186 miles of the Illinois River System comprised 7 locks and approximately 250 bridges. In addition, MSU Chicago's responsibilities include a fleet of 166 vessels and 118 regulated waterfront facilities.

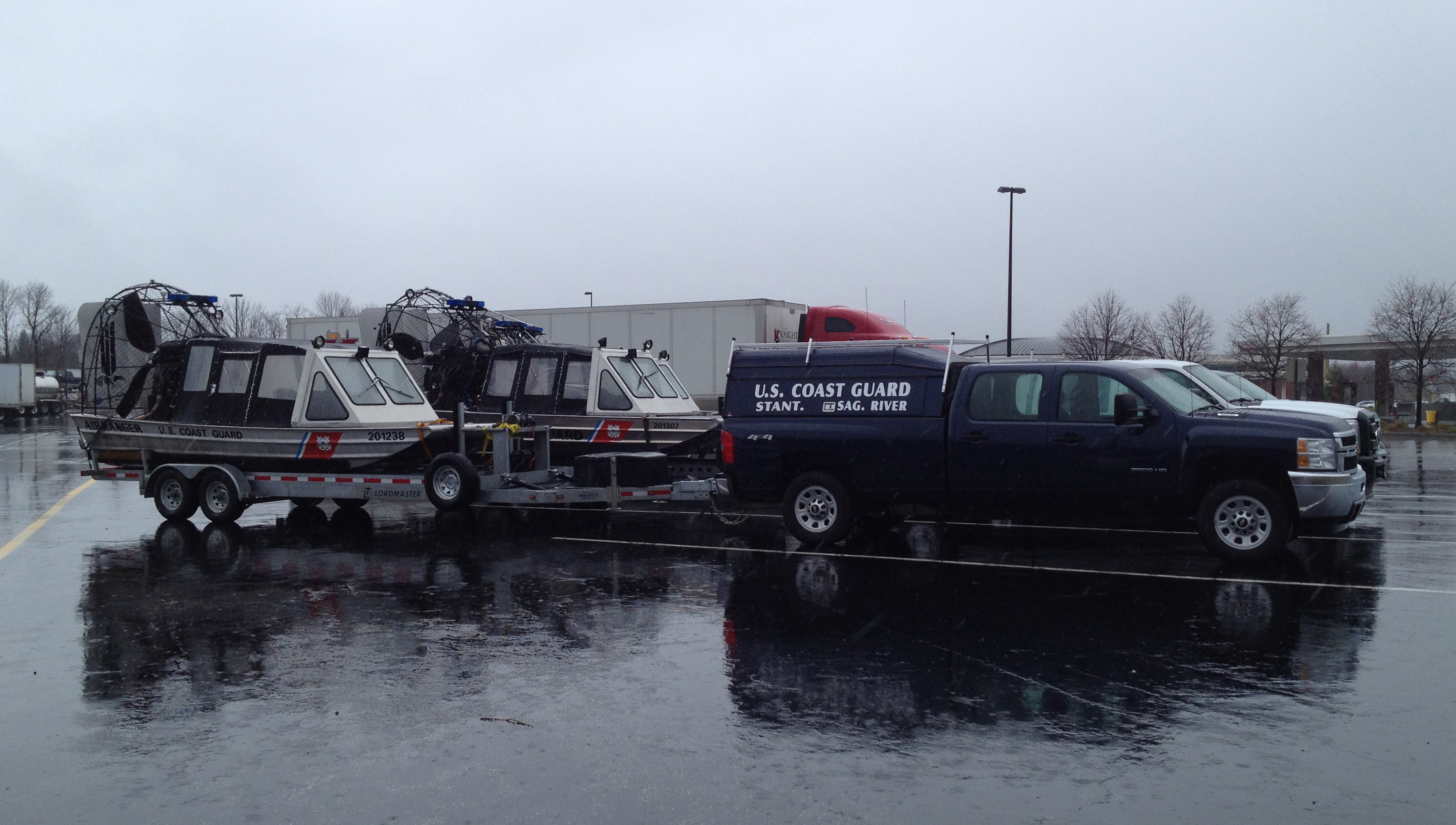
U.S. Coast Guard Great Lakes airboat crews deploy for Hurricane Sandy

- MSU Cleveland is located along Lake Erie in downtown Cleveland, Ohio. MSU Cleveland's primary missions include Maritime Safety and Security, Environmental Response, Commercial Vessel and Facility Inspections and Marine Casualty Investigations. Its area of responsibility extends from the Ohio-Pennsylvania border to Vermilion, Ohio.
- MSU Duluth is located along Lake Superior in downtown Duluth, Minnesota. MSU Duluth's primary missions include Pollution Response and Port and Waterways Management. Its area of responsibility extends from the North Dakota-Minnesota border to Grand Forks, North Dakota and includes all waters west of Marquette, Michigan.
- MSU Toledo is located along Lake Erie in downtown Toledo, Ohio. MSU Toledo's primary responsibilities are Port Safety and Security, Marine Environmental Protection, and Commercial Vessel Safety. These missions serve to ensure safe, secure, and environmental safety in its area of responsibility that is contained in the Lake Erie waters from Monroe, Michigan to Huron, Ohio.

=== Marine Safety Detachments ===
- MSD Massena's strategic location in Massena, New York allows for the detachment to effectively enforce U.S. laws, regulations, and treaties intended to limit non-indigenous species to the Great Lakes from vessels entering the Great Lakes. In addition, MSD Massena's operations include ensuring that vessels entering the Great Lakes do not pose any security, safety, or environmental hazards. The detachment is strategically located in the Great Lakes St. Lawrence Seaway Development Corporation, both the Snell and Eisenhower Locks are in close proximity. MSD Massena is a detachment of Sector Buffalo and works directly with the Prevention Department.
- MSD Sturgeon Bay is located in Sturgeon Bay, Wisconsin on Lake Michigan. The detachment is a multi-mission unit responsible for Port Safety and Security, Marine Environmental Protection, and Commercial Vessel Safety. MSD Sturgeon Bay is a detachment of Sector Lake Michigan working directly with the Prevention Department.

== Aids to Navigation Teams ==
U.S. Coast Guard Great Lakes comprises seven Aids to Navigation Teams (ANT).

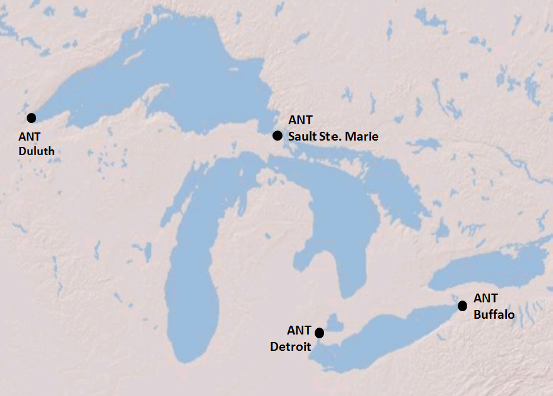
U.S. Coast Guard Great Lakes Aids to Navigation Teams Map

- ANT Buffalo is located in Buffalo, New York and services the buoys, lighthouses, and markers in Sector Buffalo area of responsibility.
- ANT Detroit is located in Detroit, Michigan and operates on the South Western end of Lake Erie through the Detroit River, to include Lake St. Clair. It is responsible for approximately 30 Aids to Navigation and secondary for 310 Aids to Navigation.
- ANT Saginaw River is located in Essexville, Michigan and services the buoys, lighthouses, and markers in the northern part of Sector Detroit's area.
- ANT Two Rivers is located in Two Rivers, Wisconsin.
- ANT Duluth is located in Duluth, Minnesota and services 168 minor Aids to Navigation and 8 lighthouses. Its area of responsibility includes Duluth Harbor, Apostle Islands, St. Louis River, Bayfield, Wisconsin and Two Harbors, Minnesota.
- ANT Muskegon is located in Muskegon, Michigan.
- ANT Sault Sainte Marie is located in Sault Sainte Marie, Michigan and services buoys, lighthouses, and markers from Munising, Michigan east to Drummond Island, Michigan with the primary operating area on the St. Mary's River system.

== List of U.S. Coast Guard Great Lakes District Auxiliary Units ==
| AUX-District | District Seal | Divisions | Location |
|---|---|---|---|
| U.S. Coast Guard Auxiliary Great Lakes District Eastern Region | | Thousand Islands #01 | St. Lawrence River, New York |
| U.S. Coast Guard Auxiliary Great Lakes District Eastern Region | | Central New York #02 | Central New York, Syracuse, New York |
| U.S. Coast Guard Auxiliary Great Lakes District Eastern Region | | Western New York #03 | Western New York, Buffalo, New York |
| U.S. Coast Guard Auxiliary Great Lakes District Eastern Region | | Finger Lakes #04 | Finger Lakes, Rochester, New York |
| U.S. Coast Guard Auxiliary Great Lakes District Eastern Region | | North Central Ohio #06 | Akron, Ohio through Vermillion, Ohio |
| U.S. Coast Guard Auxiliary Great Lakes District Eastern Region | | Cleveland and Western Pennsylvania #07 | Cleveland, Ohio and Western Pennsylvania |
| U.S. Coast Guard Auxiliary Great Lakes District Center Region | | Western Lake Erie #16 | Northwestern Ohio |
| U.S. Coast Guard Auxiliary Great Lakes District Center Region | | Detroit River #18 | Detroit, Michigan |
| U.S. Coast Guard Auxiliary Great Lakes District Center Region | | Twenty North Metro #20 | Eastern Michigan |
| U.S. Coast Guard Auxiliary Great Lakes District Center Region | | South Central #22 | Southeastern Michigan |
| U.S. Coast Guard Auxiliary Great Lakes District Center Region | | Saginaw Bay Area #24 | Bay City, Michigan |
| U.S. Coast Guard Auxiliary Great Lakes District Center Region | | Northern Great Lakes #26 | Northern Michigan and Upper Peninsula of Michigan |
| U.S. Coast Guard Auxiliary Great Lakes District Center Region | | North West #30 | Northern Minnesota |
| U.S. Coast Guard Auxiliary Great Lakes District Western Region | | Grand Haven #31 | Western Michigan |
| U.S. Coast Guard Auxiliary Great Lakes District Western Region | | St. Joseph #33 | Southwestern Michigan and Northeastern Indiana |
| U.S. Coast Guard Auxiliary Great Lakes District Western Region | | Calumet Harbor #35 | Chicago, Illinois and Gary, Indiana |
| U.S. Coast Guard Auxiliary Great Lakes District Western Region | | Chicago Rivers #37 | Illinois River Area |
| U.S. Coast Guard Auxiliary Great Lakes District Western Region | | Wilmette - Chicago #39 | North Chicago, Illinois |
| U.S. Coast Guard Auxiliary Great Lakes District Western Region | | Kenosha - Fox Waterway #41 | Northern Illinois and Southern Wisconsin |
| U.S. Coast Guard Auxiliary Great Lakes District Western Region | | Milwaukee #43 | Milwaukee, Wisconsin |
| U.S. Coast Guard Auxiliary Great Lakes District Western Region | | Green Bay #45 | Green Bay, Wisconsin |
