= Bay-class tugboat =

US Coast Guard icebreaking tugboat class

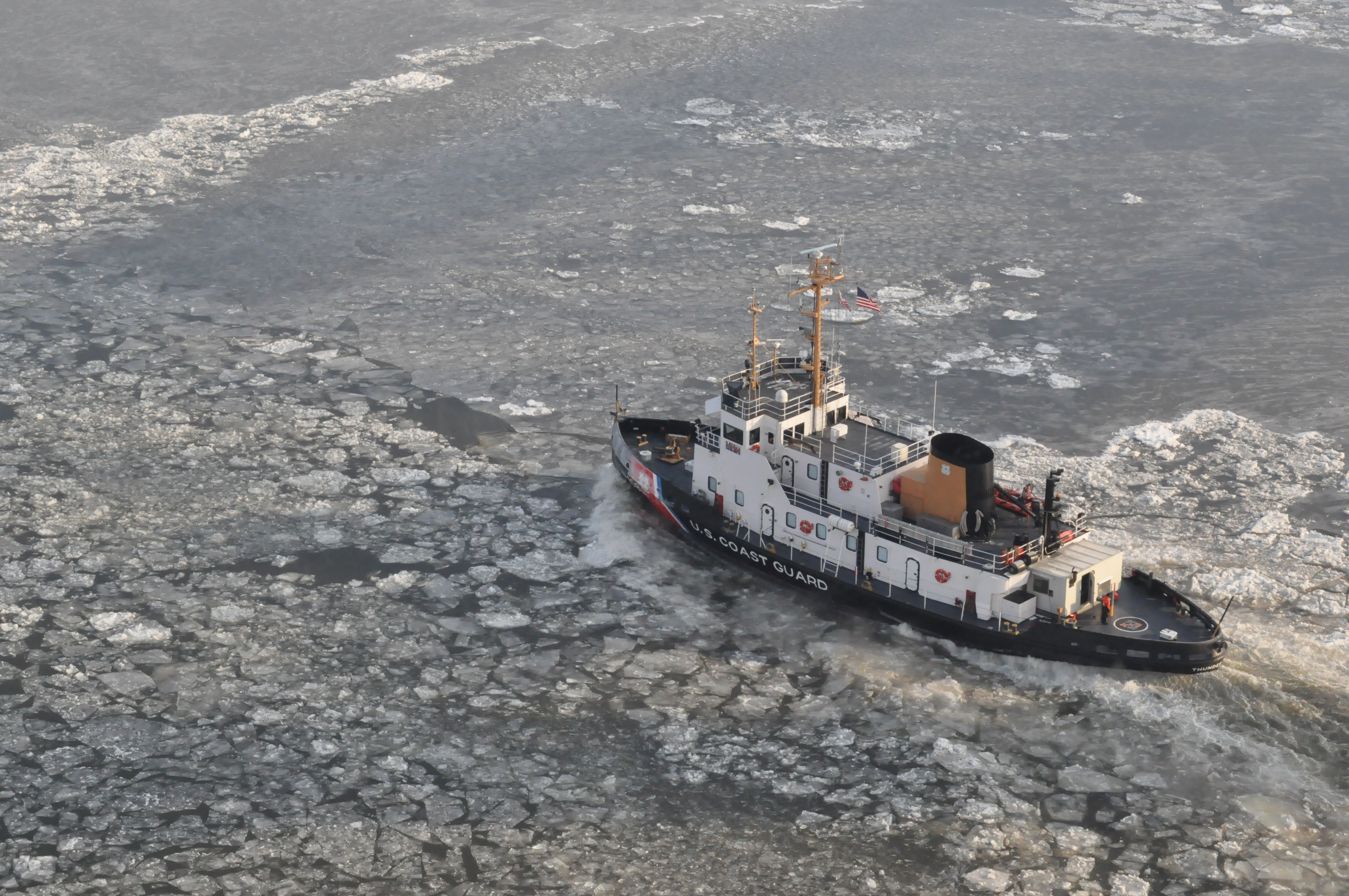
- The U.S. Coast Guard Cutter Thunder Bay clears a channel for vessels to navigate the frozen Hudson River

Class overview
- Name: Bay class
- Builders: Tacoma Boatbuilding Company, Tacoma, Washington and Bay City Marine Incorporated, National City, California
- Operators: United States Coast Guard
- Preceded by: WYTM-110
- Built: 1977-1987
- In commission: 1979-present
- Planned: 10
- Completed: 9
- Active: 9

General characteristics
- Type: Icebreaking tugboat
- Displacement: 662 tons
- Length: 42.7 m (140 ft)
- Beam: 11.4 m (37 ft 5 in)
- Draught: 3.8 m (12 ft 6 in)
- Propulsion: diesel electric: 2 Fairbanks Morse diesel engines with Westinghouse DC generators, 1 Westinghouse DC motor
- Speed: 14.7 knots (27.2 km/h)
- Range: 1,500 nautical miles (2,800 km) at 14.7 knots (27.2 km/h); 3,500 nautical miles (6,500 km) at 12 knots (22 km/h); 6,000 nautical miles (11,000 km) at 10 knots (19 km/h)
- Complement: 17 (3 officers)
- Armament: 2 × M240 machine guns

The Bay-class tugboat is a class of 140-foot (43 m) icebreaking tugboats of the United States Coast Guard, with hull numbers WTGB-101 through to WTGB-109.

They can proceed through freshwater ice up to 20 inches (51 cm) thick, and break ice up to 3 feet (0.91 m) thick, through ramming. They can also ram pressure ridges of up to 8 feet in thickness. These vessels are equipped with a system to lubricate their progress through the ice, by bubbling air through the hull.

== Service Life Extension Program (SLEP) ==
A SLEP is a major overhaul intended to extend a vessel's service life; it is typically scheduled as the vessel approaches the end of its originally planned service life. The Bay-class tugboat SLEP project includes significant system upgrades and improvements to the propulsion plant; to the heating, ventilation, and air conditioning systems; installation of an engine-room fire-suppression system; boat-launching davit replacement; oily water separator replacement; stack exhaust configuration modifications; hull air-ice lubrication system; and crew habitability improvements to meet current standards (including removal of lead paint). When the Coast Guard described the Bay-class tugboat SLEP to the U.S. Congress in 2015, the first SLEP was scheduled to take 12 months; however, the Coast Guard anticipated that after the third SLEP, the Coast Guard Yard would have enough familiarity with the process to complete two SLEPs per year, with an anticipated duration of 9 months each. The first of nine cutters (Morro Bay) entered SLEP at the Coast Guard Yard on July 1, 2014. Morro Bay returned to her homeport of Cleveland in September 2015

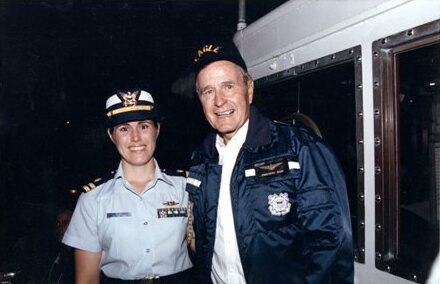
President George Herbert Walker Bush tours USCGC Katmai Bay with her commanding officer, Coast Guard Lieutenant (now Vice Admiral) Sandra L. Stosz in 1990.

== Ships ==
- (WTGB-101) Katmai Bay (Homeport - Sault Ste. Marie, MI / Builder: Tacoma Boatbuilding Company)
- (WTGB-102) Bristol Bay (Homeport - Detroit, MI / Builder: Tacoma Boatbuilding Company)
- (WTGB-103) Mobile Bay (Homeport - Sturgeon Bay, WI / Builder: Tacoma Boatbuilding Company)
- (WTGB-104) Biscayne Bay (Homeport - St. Ignace, MI / Builder: Tacoma Boatbuilding Company)
- (WTGB-105) Neah Bay (Homeport - Cleveland, OH / Builder: Tacoma Boatbuilding Company)
- (WTGB-106) Morro Bay (Homeport - Cleveland, OH / Builder: Tacoma Boatbuilding Company]
- (WTGB-107) Penobscot Bay (Homeport - Bayonne, NJ / Builder: Bay City Marine Incorporated)
- (WTGB-108) Thunder Bay (Homeport - Rockland, ME / Builder: Bay City Marine Incorporated)
- (WTGB-109) Sturgeon Bay (Homeport - Bayonne, NJ / Builder: Bay City Marine Incorporated)
- (WTGB-110) Curtis Bay (Construction cancelled)

== See also ==
- Bay-class lifeboat - twenty vessels with the Canadian Coast Guard
- Samuel Risley-class icebreaker and buoy tender with the Canadian Coast Guard
