= Stosz =

Stosz is a surname. Notable people with the surname include:

- Patryk Stosz (born 1994), Polish racing cyclist
- Sandra L. Stosz (born 1960), United States Coast Guard Vice Admiral
