= USCGC Neah Bay =

Bay-class tugboat of the United States Coast Guard

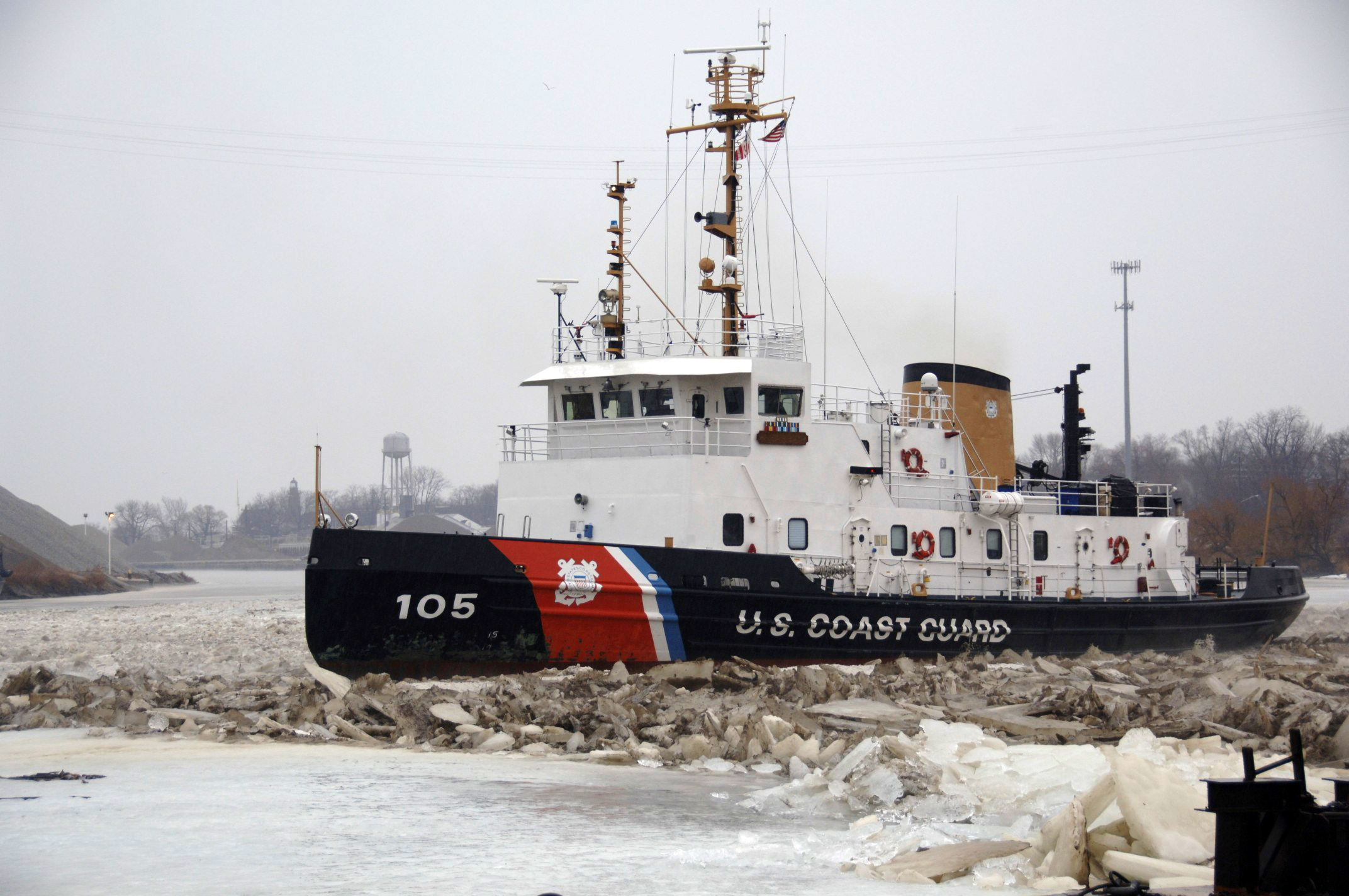
- USCGC Neah Bay

History

United States
- Name: Neah Bay
- Namesake: Neah Bay
- Builder: Tacoma Boatbuilding Co.
- Laid down: 6 August 1979
- Launched: 16 February 1980
- Commissioned: 25 October 1980
- Home port: Cleveland, Ohio
- Identification: IMO number: 8635198; MMSI number: 366999981; Callsign: NRUU; Hull number: WTGB-105
- Honors and awards: See Awards
- Status: Active

General characteristics
- Class & type: Bay-class tugboat
- Displacement: 662 t (652 long tons)
- Length: 42.7 m (140 ft)
- Beam: 11.4 m (37 ft 5 in)
- Draught: 3.8 m (12 ft 6 in)
- Propulsion: 2 × Fairbanks Morse diesel engines; 1 × Westinghouse DC motor; Westinghouse DC generators
- Speed: 14.7 knots (27.2 km/h; 16.9 mph)
- Range: 1,500 nmi (2,800 km; 1,700 mi) at 14.7 knots (27.2 km/h; 16.9 mph); 3,500 nmi (6,500 km; 4,000 mi) at 12 knots (22 km/h; 14 mph); 6,000 nmi (11,000 km; 6,900 mi) at 10 knots (19 km/h; 12 mph)
- Complement: 3 officers and 14 enlisted
- Armament: 2 × M240 machine guns

USCGC Neah Bay (WTGB-105) is the fifth vessel of the Bay-class tugboat built in 1980 and operated by the United States Coast Guard. The ship was named after a bay located within the state of Washington and bordered by Puget Sound.

== Design ==
The 140-foot Bay-class tugboats are operated primarily for domestic ice breaking duties. They are named after American bays and are stationed mainly in the northeast United States and the Great Lakes.

WTGBs use a low pressure air hull lubrication or bubbler system that forces air and water between the hull and ice. This system improves icebreaking capabilities by reducing resistance against the hull, reducing horsepower requirements.

== Construction and career ==
Neah Bay was laid down by the Tacoma Boatbuilding Co., in Tacoma, Washington on 6 August 1979. She was launched on 16 February 1980 and later commissioned in Cleveland, Ohio, on 25 October 1980.

A Himalayan cat named Casca in which was rescued by Lt. Commander Molly Waters during a stint in Alaska, now sits on board the ship.

On 3 February 2021, Neah Bay was deployed alongside CCGS Samuel Risley to help relieve flooding along the St. Clair River, joining the USCGC Bristol Bay and CCGS Griffon who had previously been working to break up ice jams there.

In January 2025, Neah Bay was one of several Coast Guard ships deployed to free the bulk carrier Manitoulin which was stuck in ice near Buffalo, New York.

== Awards ==
- Coast Guard Presidential Unit Citation
- Secretary of Transportation Outstanding Unit Award
- Coast Guard Unit Commendation
- Coast Guard Meritorious Unit Commendation
- Coast Guard Bicentennial Unit Commendation
- National Defense Service Medal
- Global War on Terrorism Service Medal
- Humanitarian Service Medal
- Transportation 9-11 Ribbon
- Coast Guard Special Operations Service Ribbon
- Coast Guard Sea Service Ribbon
