= USCGC Mobile Bay =

United States Coast Guard icebreaker

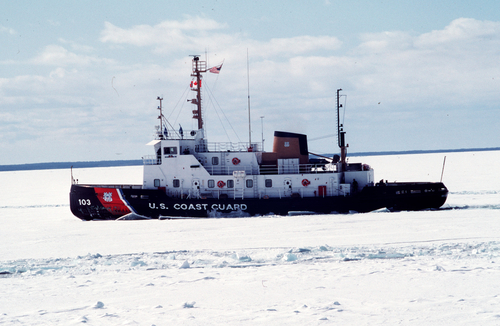
- USCGC Mobile Bay (WTGB-103)

History

United States
- Namesake: Mobile Bay, Alabama
- Builder: Tacoma Boatbuilding Company
- Launched: December 11, 1978
- Commissioned: September 2, 1979
- Home port: Sturgeon Bay, Wisconsin
- Identification: IMO number: 8635162; MMSI number: 366999979; Callsign: NRUR
- Motto: "Breaking the trail, Marking the way"
- Status: Active

General characteristics
- Class & type: USCG Bay-class icebreaking tug (WTGB)
- Type: Icebreaker tug
- Displacement: 690 tons
- Length: 140 ft
- Beam: 37.5 ft
- Draft: 12.5
- Ice class: 60 inch continuous, 10 feet back/ramming
- Installed power: Diesel Electric
- Propulsion: Two Fairbanks-Morse diesel engines
- Speed: 19.7 knots (36.5 km/h; 22.7 mph) max
- Boats & landing craft carried: 1 utility boat; 120 ft (37 m) aids-to-navigation barge
- Crew: 30

USCGC Mobile Bay (WTGB-103) is an active icebreaking tug under the direction of the United States Coast Guard. Her homeport is located in Sturgeon Bay, Wisconsin. She is one of two ships in her class that has been equipped with a 120-foot (37 m) aids-to-navigation (ATON) barge operating on the Great Lakes. The vessel was specifically designed to carry out icebreaking missions, but also carries out missions in search and rescue, environmental pollution response, maritime law enforcement, and homeland security.

During the fall season, Mobile Bay is responsible for aids to navigation work in Green Bay and Lake Michigan. Mobile Bay is able to do ATON, unlike other vessels of her class, because it is one of two ships in the class with a 120-foot (37 m) ATON barge. During this time, the cutter is tasked with replacing traditional channel markers with winter markers, which are more capable of handling the extreme conditions seen in the Great Lakes during the winter months. During the winter months, Mobile Bay detaches from the ATON barge and is largely responsible for ice breaking in the Northern Great Lakes in order to maintain an operable level of maritime commerce in the region. This time period often lasts from December to Mid-April. During the spring months, Mobile Bay once again is responsible for aids to navigation work. At this time, the cutter will replace the buoys set in the fall with the traditional channel markers, since the winter months will have ended. The cutter will also inspect year round buoys to ensure they are positioned correctly and watching properly.

== See also ==
- USCGC Mackinaw (WLBB-30)
