= USCGC Morro Bay =

Bay-class tugboat of the United States Coast Guard

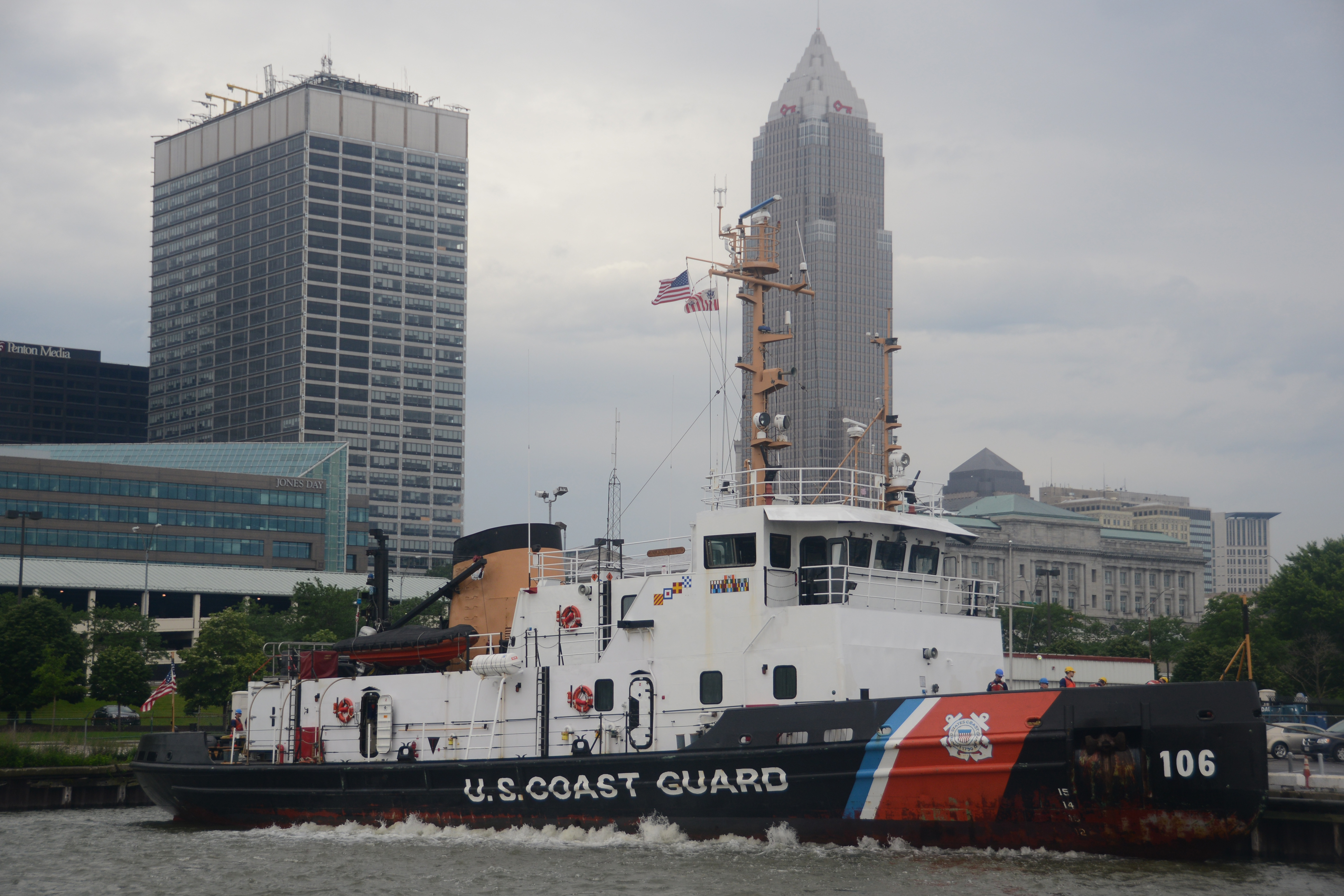
- USCGC Morro Bay

History

United States
- Name: Morro Bay
- Namesake: Morro Bay
- Builder: Tacoma Boatbuilding Co.
- Laid down: 6 August 1979
- Launched: 11 July 1980
- Commissioned: 28 March 1981
- Home port: Cleveland, Ohio
- Identification: IMO number: 8635215; MMSI number: 366999985; Callsign: NMHK; Hull number: WTGB-106
- Nickname(s): Jack of All Trades
- Honors and awards: See Awards
- Status: Active

General characteristics
- Class & type: Bay-class tugboat
- Displacement: 662 t (652 long tons)
- Length: 42.7 m (140 ft)
- Beam: 11.4 m (37 ft 5 in)
- Draught: 3.8 m (12 ft 6 in)
- Propulsion: 2 × Fairbanks Morse diesel engines; 1 × Westinghouse DC motor; Westinghouse DC generators
- Speed: 14.7 knots (27.2 km/h; 16.9 mph)
- Range: 1,500 nmi (2,800 km; 1,700 mi) at 14.7 knots (27.2 km/h; 16.9 mph); 3,500 nmi (6,500 km; 4,000 mi) at 12 knots (22 km/h; 14 mph); 6,000 nmi (11,000 km; 6,900 mi) at 10 knots (19 km/h; 12 mph)
- Complement: 3 officers and 14 enlisted
- Armament: 2 × M240 machine guns

USCGC Morro Bay (WTGB-106) is the sixth vessel of the Bay-class tugboats built in 1980 and operated by the United States Coast Guard. The ship was named after a seaside city in San Luis Obispo County, California.

== Design ==
The 140-foot (43 m) Bay-class tugboats are operated primarily for domestic ice breaking duties. They are named after American bays and are stationed mainly in the northeast United States and the Great Lakes.

WTGBs use a low pressure air hull lubrication or bubbler system that forces air and water between the hull and ice. This system improves icebreaking capabilities by reducing resistance against the hull, reducing horsepower requirements.

== Construction and career ==
Morro Bay was laid down by the Tacoma Boatbuilding Co., in Tacoma, Washington, 1979. She was launched on 11 July 1980 and later commissioned at the Reserve Training Center in Yorktown, Virginia, on 28 March 1981. She served at Yorktown until 1998 and then at New London, Connecticut, before she was reassigned to Cleveland, Ohio, in the summer of 2014.

On 2 July 2008, Morro Bay was returning to New London when she collided with a Block Island ferry.

In May 2018, Morro Bay arrived at the Great Lakes Shipyard for repairs and maintenance.

On 13 June 2021, while the museum ship USS Cod was being towed out of Cleveland for repairs, Morro Bay collided with Cod at 11:30 a.m., though damage to the vessels was minor.

== Awards ==
- Coast Guard Presidential Unit Citation
- Transportation 9-11 Ribbon
- Coast Guard Unit Commendation
- Coast Guard Meritorious Unit Commendation
- Coast Guard Bicentennial Unit Commendation
- National Defense Service Medal with star
- Global War on Terrorism Service Medal
- Humanitarian Service Medal
- Coast Guard Special Operations Service Ribbon
- Coast Guard Sea Service Ribbon
