= Sandra L. Stosz =

United States Coast Guard admiral

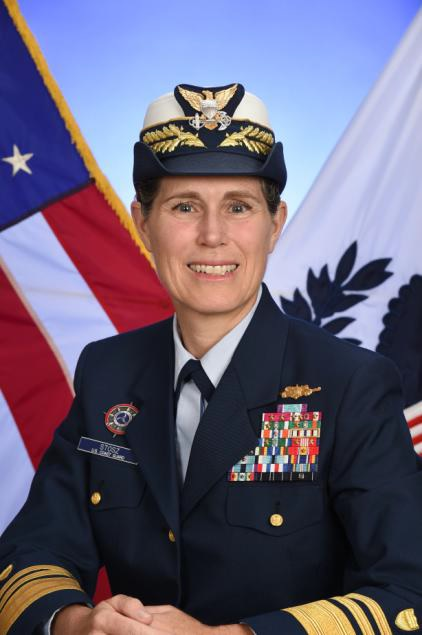
- Vice Admiral Stosz in 2015

40th Superintendent of the United States Coast Guard Academy
- In office June 3, 2011 – June 1, 2015
- President: Barack Obama
- Preceded by: J. Scott Burhoe
- Succeeded by: James Rendon

Personal details
- Born: Sandra Leigh Stosz; 1960 (age 65–66) Takoma Park, Maryland, U.S.
- Military career
- Alma mater: United States Coast Guard Academy (1978-1982)
- Spouse: Bob Volpe
- Relatives: Max Stosz (father); Joy Stosz; 3 brothers
- Allegiance: United States
- Branch: United States Coast Guard
- Service years: 1982–2018
- Rank: Vice admiral
- Commands: U.S. Coast Guard Academy; Training Center Cape May USCGC Reliance USCGC Katmai Bay
- Awards: Legion of Merit Meritorious Service Medal (four awards); Coast Guard Commendation Medal (two awards); Coast Guard Achievement Medal (two awards)

Sandra Leigh Stosz (born 1960) is a retired United States Coast Guard Vice Admiral whose final active duty assignment was as Deputy Commandant for Mission Support. Previously, she was chosen by the Commandant of the United States Coast Guard, ADM Robert J. Papp to become the superintendent of the United States Coast Guard Academy in 2011. As such, she is the first woman to lead a United States service academy. At the time of her appointment to head the Coast Guard Academy, she was the Coast Guard's director of Reserve and leadership. Stosz was confirmed as a vice admiral in May 2015.

== Early life and education ==
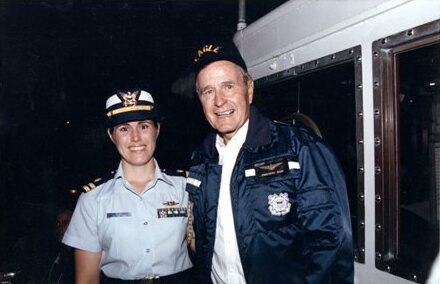
Stosz as a lieutenant in 1991, with U.S. President George H.W. Bush.

Stosz was the Maryland state discus champion while at Mount Hebron High School in Ellicott City, and a Junior Olympic-caliber swimmer.

Stosz, a 1982 graduate of the United States Coast Guard Academy in New London, Connecticut, holds a master of business administration degree from Northwestern University's Kellogg School of Management in Evanston, Illinois.

== Career ==
Stosz is the first female graduate of the Coast Guard Academy to achieve flag rank. At the academy, she competed for Coast Guard's sailing team, which became co-educational, and for the men's swimming team before women's sports were introduced.

In 1990, as a Coast Guard lieutenant, Stosz became the first woman to command a Coast Guard cutter in the Great Lakes. The cutter was USCGC Katmai Bay (WTGB 101), which, homeported in Sault Sainte Marie, Michigan, has operated since her 1979 launching in the Great Lakes as a unit of the Ninth Coast Guard District. The Katmai Bay is a 140-foot ice-breaking tug, with a crew of 17 (3 officers and 14 enlisted). She has also served as the commanding officer of United States Coast Guard Training Center Cape May, New Jersey.

=== Flag officer ===
In her role as leader of the Coast Guard Reserve, early in 2011 she announced plans to raise the Coast Guard Reserve to 8,100 personnel from the 7,600 reservists available in 2010; the reason was partly experience with the Deepwater Horizon Oil Spill, during which the Coast Guard struggled with insufficient reserve personnel to support the active-duty contingent.

=== Academy ===
In 2013, on behalf of Coast Guard Academy, Stosz signed an interagency agreement with Vice Admiral Michael S. Devany, chief of the National Oceanic and Atmospheric Administration.

In September 2014, it was announced that Stosz would be continue service as an admiral. Prior to Stosz, all USCGA superintendents had retired upon completion of their term.

Stosz's tenure at the academy ended on 1 June 2015, when she was relieved by Rear Admiral James Rendon. The change of command ceremony was supervised by the Vice Commandant of the United States Coast Guard, Vice Admiral Peter V. Neffenger.

=== 2015–2018 ===
Stosz was confirmed as vice admiral by the US Senate on Sunday 31 May 2015, and 'frocked' in an impromptu ceremony the next day before handing over command of the academy. She served in Washington as deputy commandant for mission support until relieved by Vice Adm. Michael F. McAllister on 25 May 2018.

== Personal life ==
Stosz is married to Bob Volpe, a retired U.S. Coast Guard lieutenant commander.

In a People Magazine profile, she described her career in the U.S. Coast Guard as her "lifetime adventure". Her parents were chemical engineers Max Stosz and his wife Joy. Stosz has three siblings, all brothers.

She has described her "most enjoyable assignment" as being her initial tour, once completing her studies at Coast Guard Academy, as an ensign on the icebreaker USCGC Glacier (AGB/WAG/WAGB 4), which took her to Haiti, New Zealand, various South Pacific islands, and Antarctica.

== Honors ==
- In 2012, Stosz was named in Newsweek as one of "150 Women Who Shake the World".
