= USCGC Biscayne Bay =

USCGC Biscayne Bay (WTGB-104)
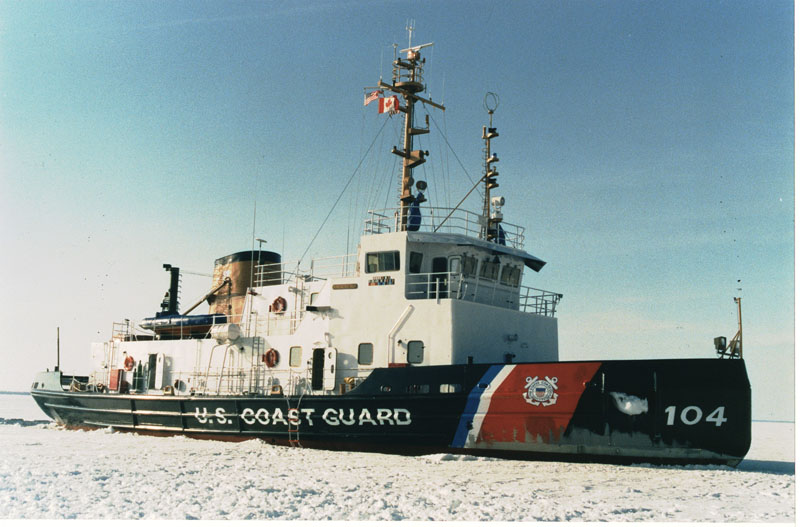
- USCGC Biscayne Bay (WTGB-104)

History

United States
- Namesake: Biscayne Bay in southern Florida
- Builder: Tacoma Boatbuilding Company
- Commissioned: 8 December 1979
- Home port: St. Ignace, Michigan
- Identification: IMO number: 8635148; MMSI number: 366999980; Callsign: NRUS
- Nickname(s): Sentinel of the Straits
- Status: Active
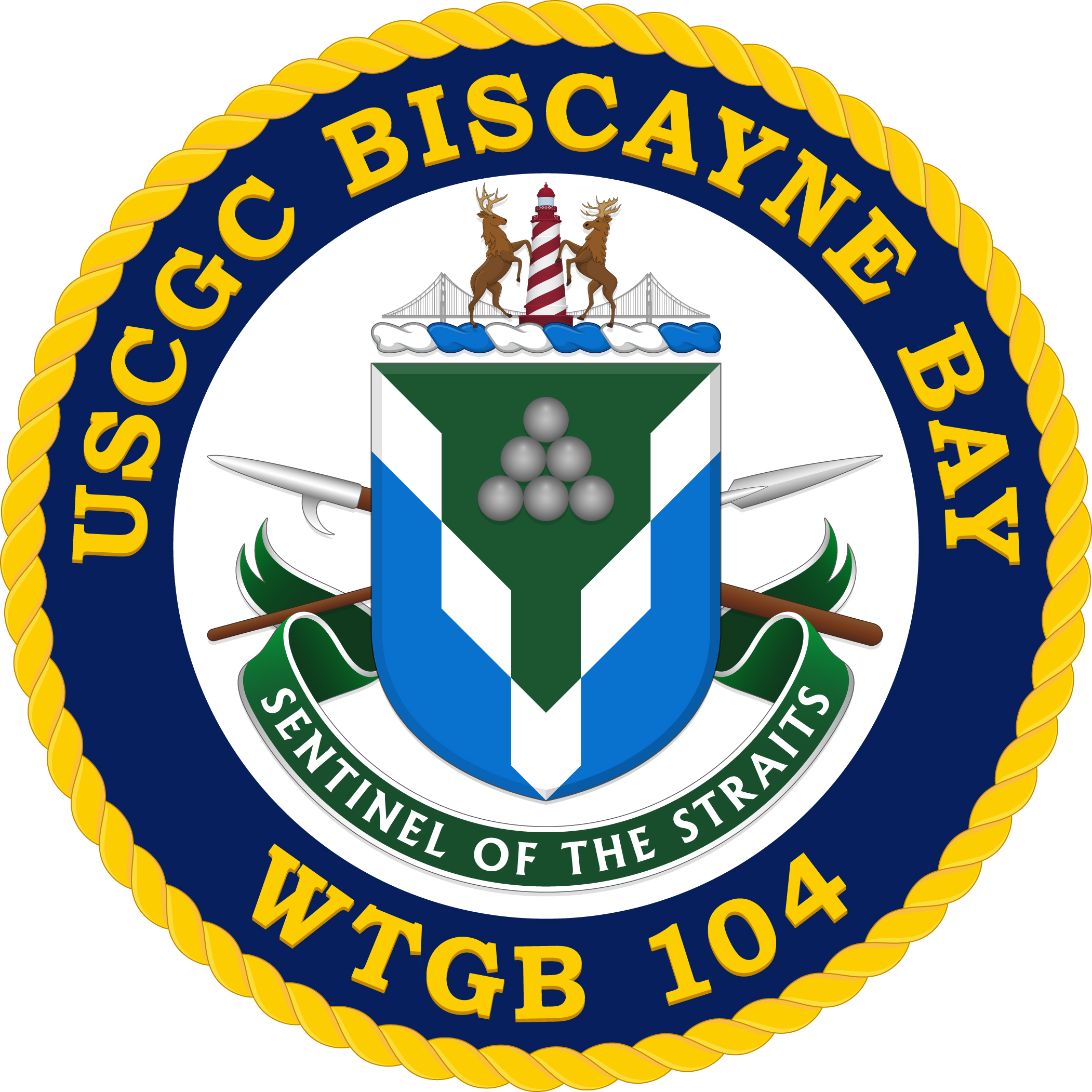
- Badge

General characteristics
- Class & type: 140-foot Bay-class icebreaking tug (WTGB)
- Displacement: 690 tons
- Length: 140 ft (43 m)
- Beam: 37 ft 6 in (11.43 m)
- Draft: 13 ft (4.0 m)
- Installed power: 2 × 1,426 hp (1,063 kW) Fairbanks-Morse diesel engines; 2 × 125 kW generators
- Propulsion: 2,500 hp (1,900 kW) Westinghouse electric motor driving the main propulsion shaft
- Speed: 14.7 knots (27.2 km/h; 16.9 mph)
- Range: 7,413 km (4,606 mi)
- Complement: 17 (3 officers, 14 enlisted)
- Armament: mounts for two .50 cal machine guns
- Armor: Ice belt thickness 5/8 in (1.6 cm)
- Notes: Icebreaking capacity: 3 knots ahead - 20 in (51 cm), back and ram - 6–9 ft (1.8–2.7 m)

USCGC Biscayne Bay (WTGB-104) is a United States Coast Guard Cutter and an icebreaking tug. She is based at Coast Guard Station St. Ignace with a primary area of operation in the Straits of Mackinac including Mackinac Island, Mackinac Bridge, and the northern portions of Lakes Michigan and Huron and occasionally Lakes Superior, Erie and their connecting rivers. Beyond her role as an icebreaker, Biscayne Bay performs search and rescue and law enforcement functions.

== Design ==
Biscayne Bay is the fourth ship in a class of ice-breaking tugboats designed to have greater multi-mission capabilities than the 110-foot Calumet-class harbor tug (WYTM). The most significant differences include: greater horsepower, greater speed, longer range, increased ice-breaking capability, a hull lubrication system (bubbler), greater degree of automation, and better habitability.
