= USCGC Bristol Bay =

Bay-class tugboat of the United States Coast Guard

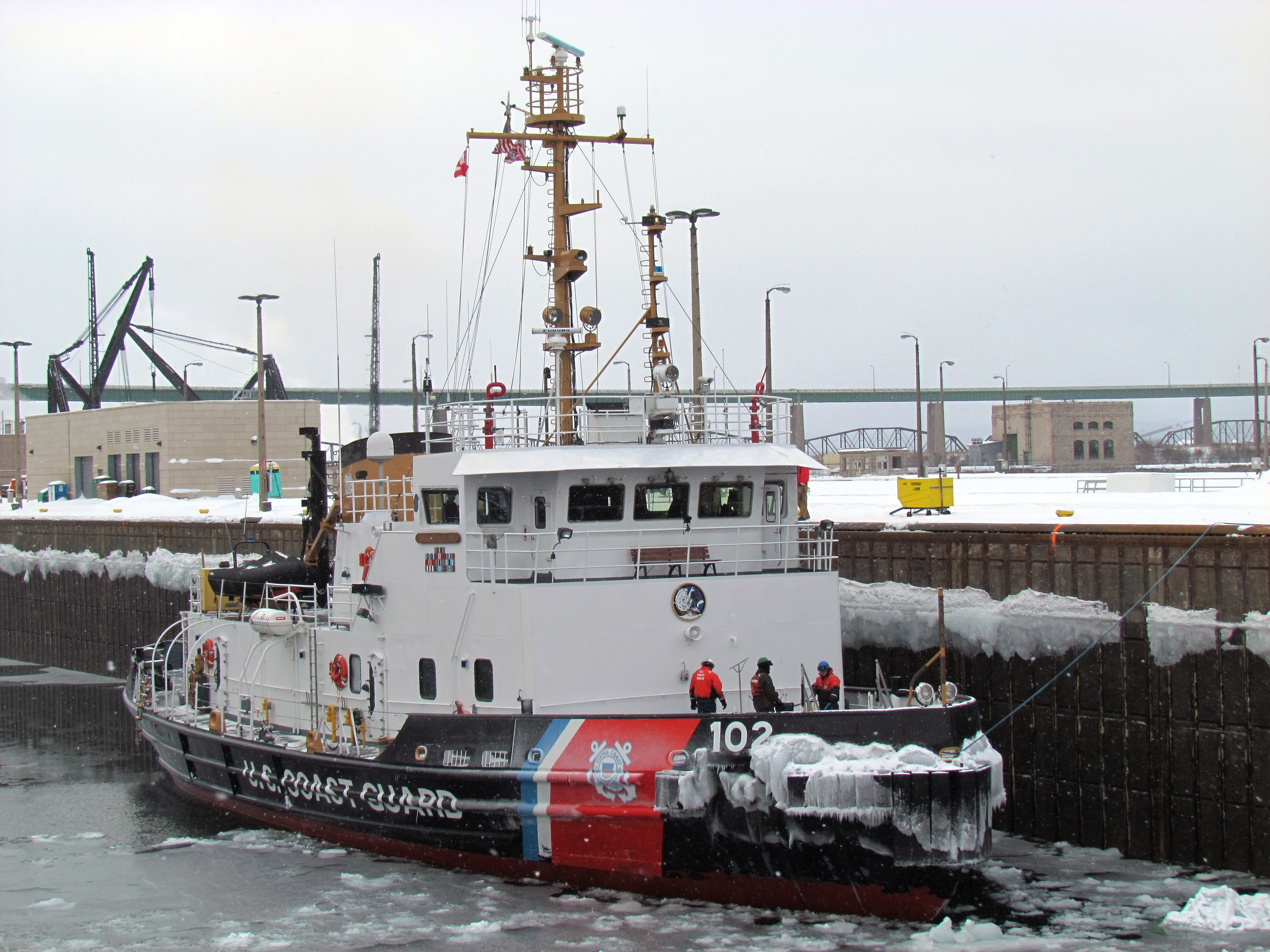
- USCGC Bristol Bay

History

United States
- Name: Bristol Bay
- Namesake: Bristol Bay
- Builder: Tacoma Boatbuilding Co.
- Completed: 1978
- Commissioned: 1979
- Home port: Detroit, Michigan
- Identification: IMO number: 8635150; MMSI number: 366999978; Callsign: NRLY; Hull number: WTGB-102
- Honors and awards: See Awards
- Status: Active

General characteristics
- Class & type: Bay-class tugboat
- Displacement: 662 t (652 long tons)
- Length: 42.7 m (140 ft)
- Beam: 11.4 m (37 ft 5 in)
- Draft: 3.8 m (12 ft 6 in)
- Propulsion: 2 × Fairbanks-Morse diesel engines; 1 × Westinghouse DC motor; Westinghouse DC generators
- Speed: 14.7 knots (27.2 km/h; 16.9 mph)
- Range: 1,500 nmi (2,800 km; 1,700 mi) at 14.7 knots; 3,500 nmi (6,500 km; 4,000 mi) at 12 knots (22 km/h; 14 mph); 6,000 nmi (11,000 km; 6,900 mi) at 10 knots (19 km/h; 12 mph)
- Complement: 3 officers and 14 enlisted
- Armament: 2 × M240 machine guns

USCGC Bristol Bay (WTGB-102) is the second vessel of the Bay-class tugboats built in 1978 and operated by the United States Coast Guard. The ship was named after the body of water formed by the Alaskan peninsula, which empties into the Bering Sea.

== Design ==
The 140-foot Bay-class tugboats are operated primarily for domestic icebreaking duties. They are named after American bays and are stationed mainly in the Northeastern United States and the Great Lakes.

WTGBs use a low-pressure, air-hull lubrication or bubbler system that forces air and water between the hull and ice. This system improves icebreaking capabilities by reducing resistance against the hull, thus reducing horsepower requirements.

== Construction and career ==
Bristol Bay was built by the Tacoma Boatbuilding Co., in Tacoma, Washington, in 1978. She was commissioned in Detroit, Michigan, 1979.

In August 1991, Bristol Bay became the first Bay-class tugboat to receive a barge specially designed to perform aids to navigation work. The 120-foot (37 m) barge works with the ship to service more than 160 aids to navigation each year.

USCGC Hollyhock and Bristol Bay were deployed for icebreaking at the St. Clair River on 25 February 2019.

On 3 February 2021, Bristol Bay and CCGS Griffon were both dispatched to break up ice at the St. Clair River. On 25 January 2022, Bristol Bay and CCGS Samuel Risley freed the lake freighter Assiniboione after the freighter was stuck in ice on the St. Clair River.

In January 2025, Bristol Bay was deployed to help free the Manitoulin after she became icebound near Buffalo.

== Awards ==
- Coast Guard Unit Commendation
- Coast Guard Meritorious Unit Commendation
- Coast Guard Meritorious Team Commendation
- Coast Guard Bicentennial Unit Commendation
- National Defense Service Medal
- Global War on Terrorism Service Medal
- Humanitarian Service Medal
- Transportation 9-11 Ribbon
- Coast Guard Special Operations Service Ribbon
- Coast Guard Sea Service Medal
