= USCGC Mackinaw (WLBB-30) =

US Coast Guard heavy icebreaker

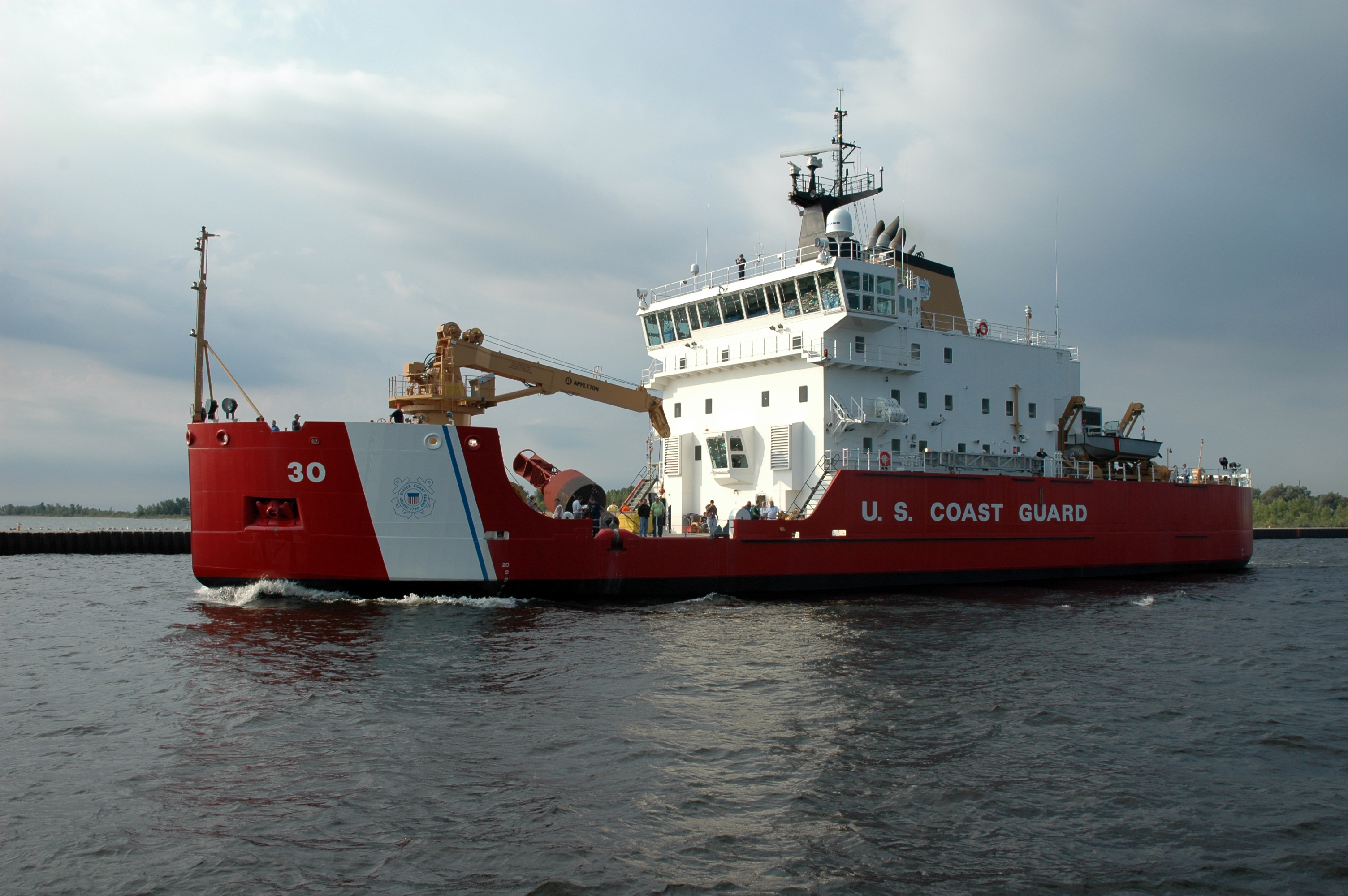
- USCGC Mackinaw

History

United States
- Builder: Marinette Marine Corporation (MMC)
- Laid down: February 09, 2004
- Launched: April 2, 2005
- Commissioned: June 10, 2006
- Home port: Cheboygan, Michigan
- Identification: IMO number: 9271054; MMSI number: 369992000; Callsign: NBGB

General characteristics
- Displacement: 3,500 tons
- Length: 240 ft (73 m)
- Beam: 58.5 ft (17.8 m)
- Draft: 16 ft (4.9 m)
- Propulsion: Integrated Main Propulsion & Electrical Plant; ABB Azipod - Fixed Pitch, 10’ diameter; 9,119 shp (6.8 MW)
- Speed: 16 knots (30 km/h)
- Complement: 9 Officers, 46 Enlisted
- Armament: 2 x machine guns; Various small arms
- Capacity: 130,896 US gal (495 kl) (Diesel fuel); 27,500 US gal (104 kl) (potable water)

USCGC Mackinaw (WLBB-30) is a 240-foot (73 m) multi-purpose vessel with a primary mission as a heavy Great Lakes icebreaker specifically built for operations on the North American Great Lakes for the United States Coast Guard. Her IMO number is 9271054.

Her larger precursor, the USCGC Mackinaw (WAGB-83), IMO number 6119534, had a 62-year career on the same waters prior to being decommissioned on June 10, 2006, and turned into a museum ship docked in Mackinaw City, Michigan.

Among the missions the current Mackinaw is capable of and tasked with as needed is buoy tending, law enforcement and interdiction, search and rescue, and environmental remediation response.

== Background ==
Mackinaw was delivered to the Coast Guard on November 18, 2005, and commissioned on June 10, 2006. In addition to her ice-breaking duties, the Mackinaw also serves as an Aids-to-Navigation ship, since she is able to perform the same duties as the Seagoing Buoy Tenders (WLB) of the Coast Guard fleet. Further, she can conduct law enforcement and search-and-rescue missions and can deploy an oil-skimming system to respond to oil-spill situations and environmental response.

== Mechanical aspects ==
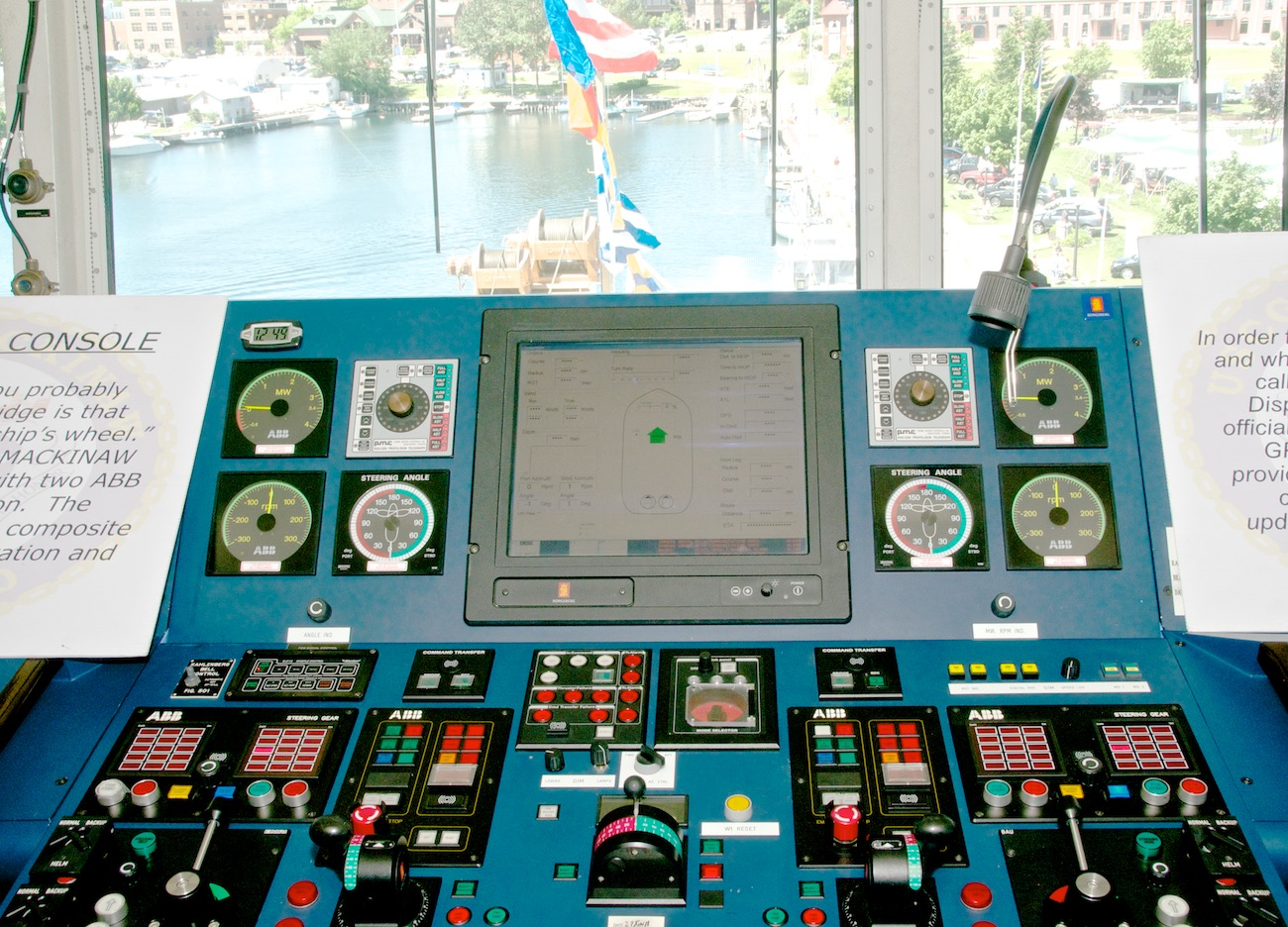
Mackinaw's Main Control Console, which is used to steer the ship instead of a steering wheel.

The Mackinaw is powered by three Caterpillar 3612 Turbocharged V-12 engines - 3360 KW each. One of the Mackinaw's unique features in the US Coast Guard fleet is the use of two Azipod units, ABB's brand of electric azimuth thrusters, for her main propulsion. These, coupled with a 550 hp (410 kW) bow thruster, make the ship exceptionally maneuverable. The Azipod units also remove the need for a traditional rudder, as the thrusters can turn 360 degrees around their vertical axis to direct their thrust in any direction. The Mackinaw also lacks a traditional ship's steering wheel. Much of the ship’s technology, including the Azipod thrusters, is from Finnish Maritime Cluster. Additionally, the Mackinaw can continuously proceed through fresh water ice up to 32 inches (81 cm) thick at 3 knots or 14 inches (36 cm) at 10 knots. She can also break smooth, continuous ice up to 42 inches (110 cm) thick by rising on top of it and crushing it with the weight of her bow.

== History ==
The Mackinaw got off to a rocky start before being commissioned. While en route to her new home port of Cheboygan, Michigan, the Mackinaw struck a seawall in Grand Haven, Michigan on December 12, 2005. The accident caused a 10-foot (3.0 m) dent in her starboard bow. Shortly after, Captain Donald Triner, the commanding officer of the Mackinaw, was temporarily relieved of duty pending an investigation into the event. The accident did not delay the ship, which arrival on schedule on December 17, 2005. Captain Triner was later permanently relieved of duty and replaced by Captain Michael Hudson.

The Mackinaw is stationed at Cheboygan, Michigan. It can be seen and toured at Grand Haven's Coast Guard Festival every summer. The ship was also featured on the television series Modern Marvels.

Captain Hudson was subsequently replaced by Commander John Little in April 2006. CDR Scott J. Smith assumed command in July 2008 and was relieved by CDR Michael J. Davanzo in Aug, 2011. In June 2014, CDR Vasilios Tasikas assumed command. In June 2017, CDR John Stone assumed command. In June 2020, CDR Kristen Serumgard assumed command. In July 2022, CDR Jeannette Greene assumed command. In July 2025, CDR Daniel O’Brien assumed command.

Katmai Bay, stationed at Sault Ste. Marie, Michigan, helps the Mackinaw in ice breaking duties.

== Gallery ==
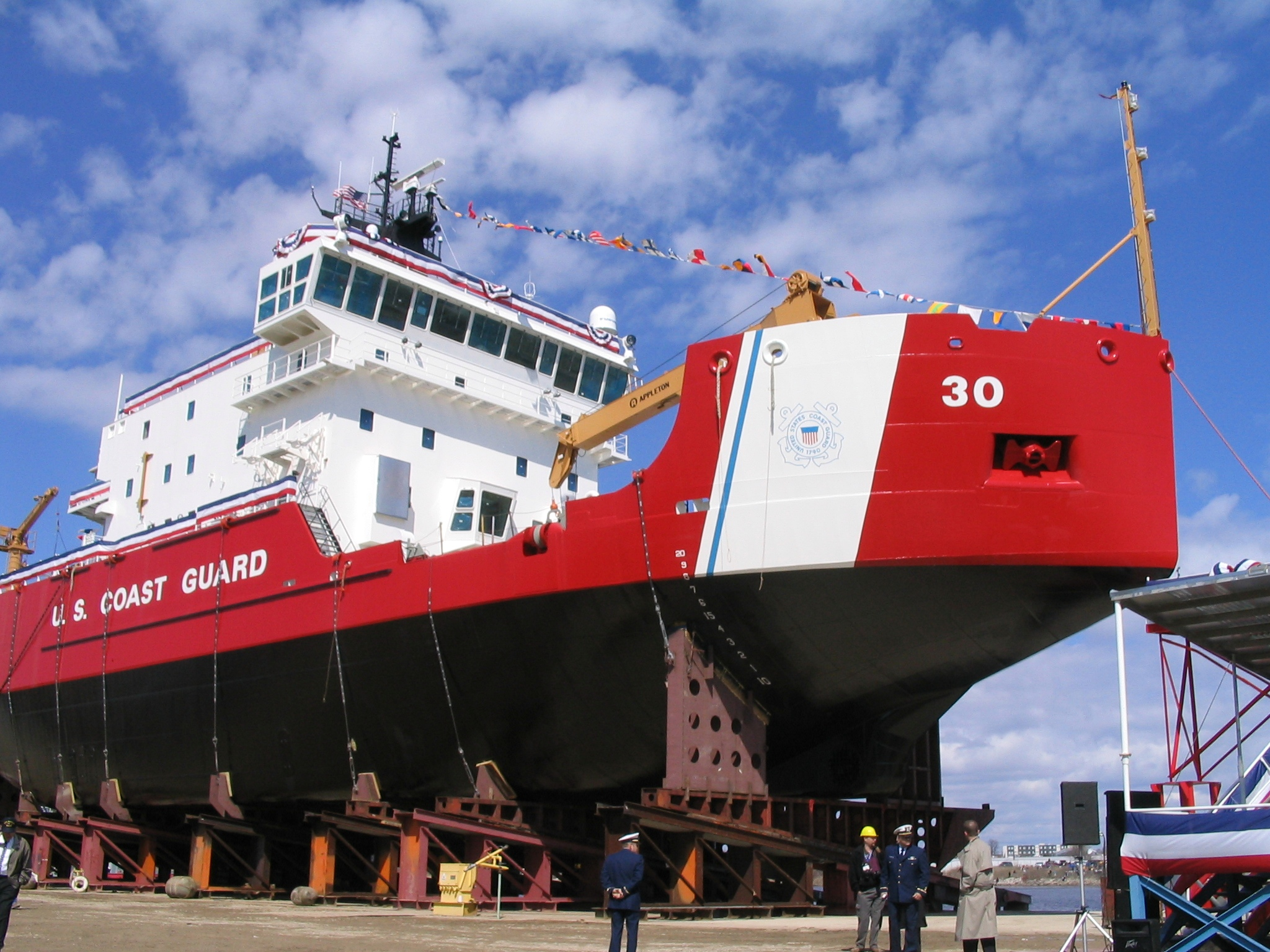
USCGC Mackinaw on launch day, April 2, 2005.

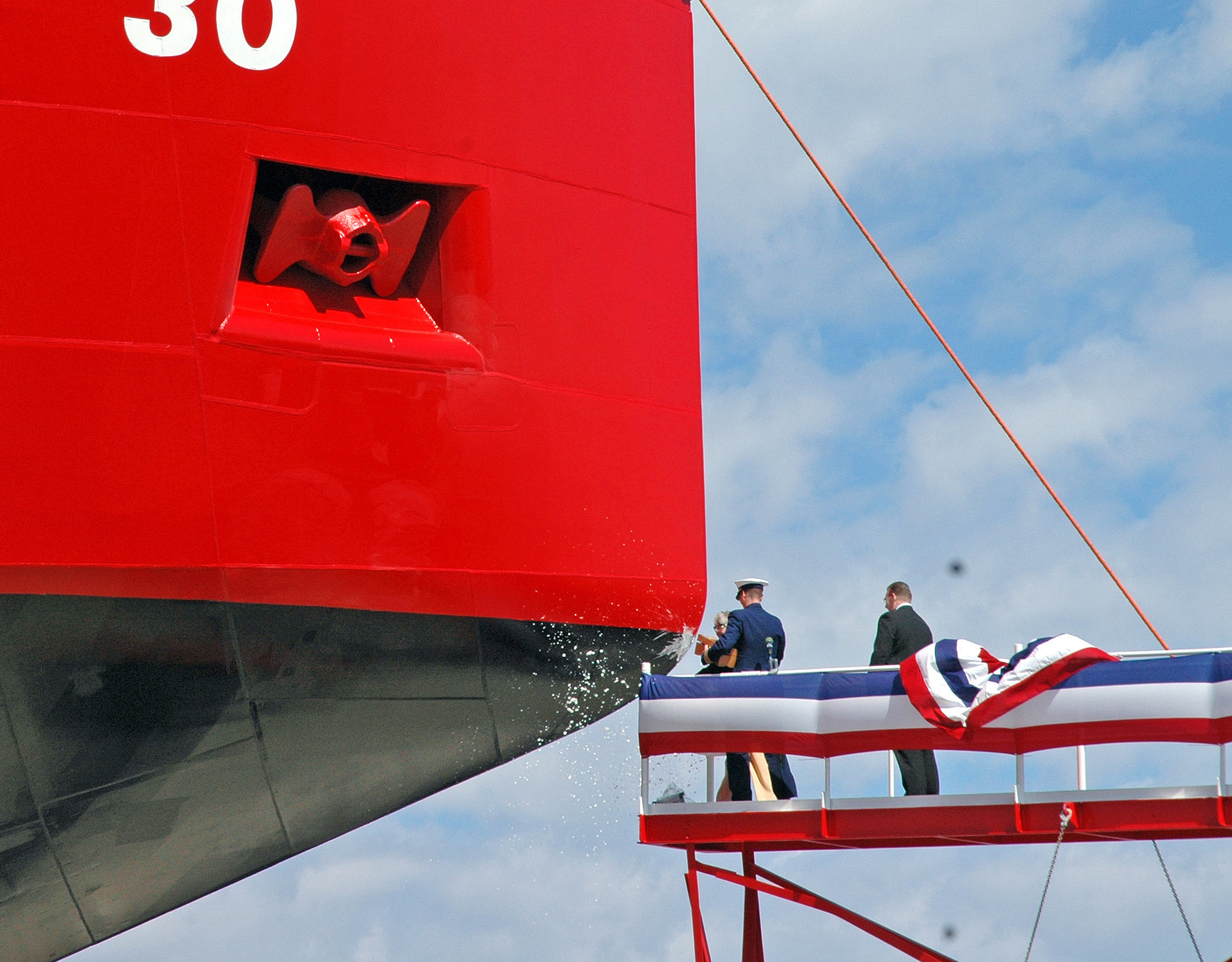
Breaking the champagne bottle on the bow of USCGC Mackinaw on launch day, April 2, 2005.

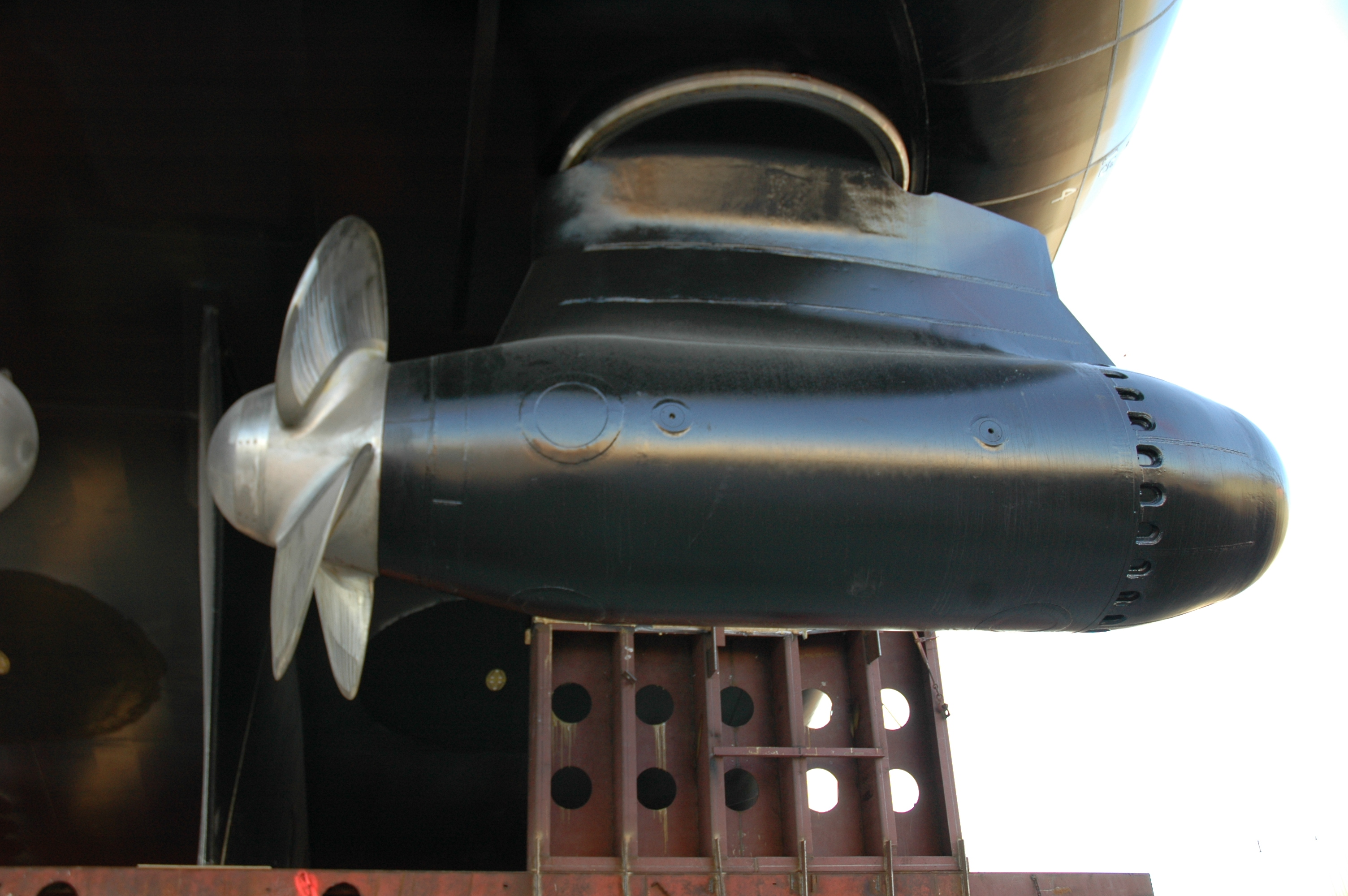
Closeup of one of the ship's Azipods.

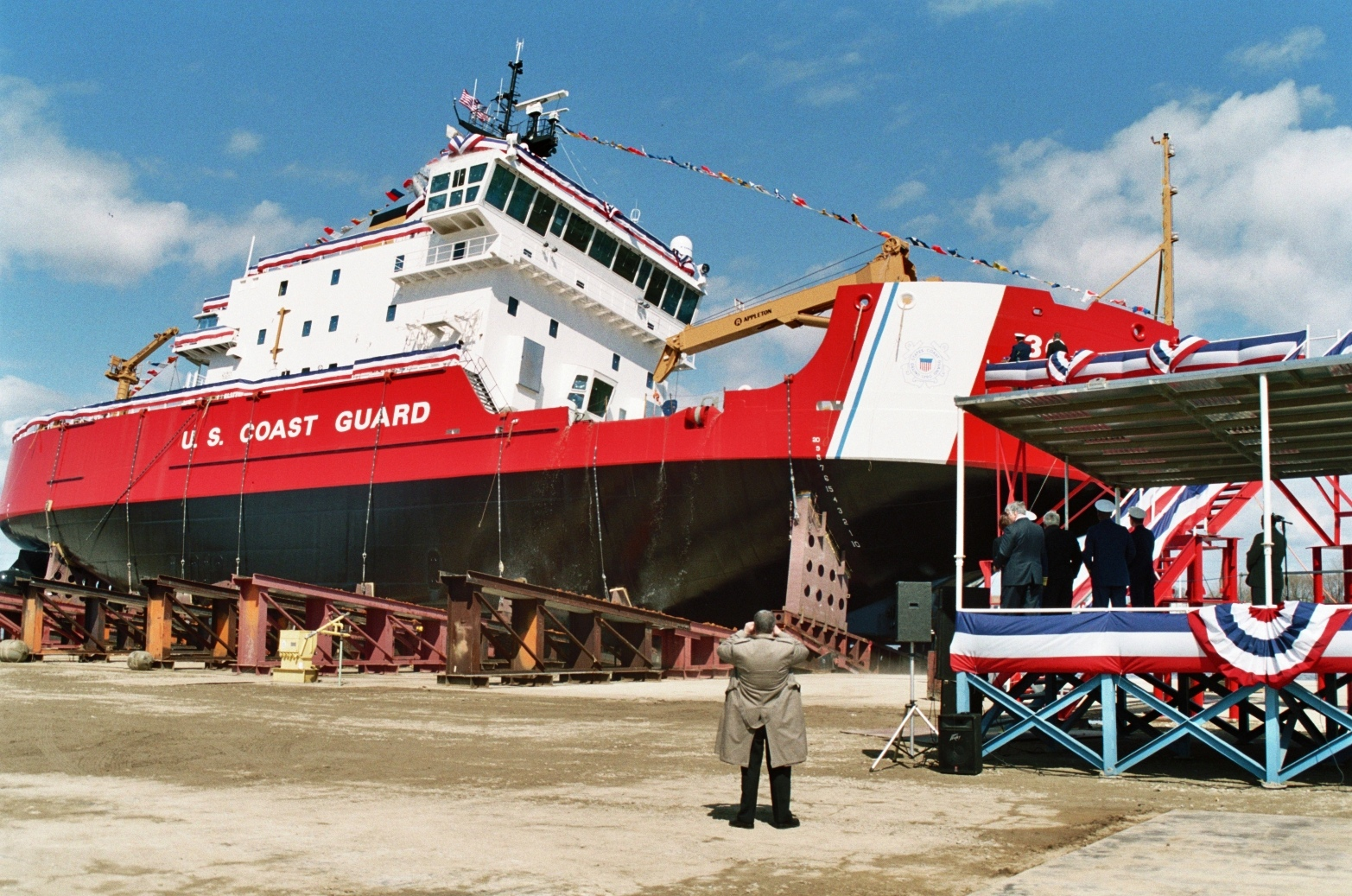
USCGC Mackinaw sliding towards the river during the launch.

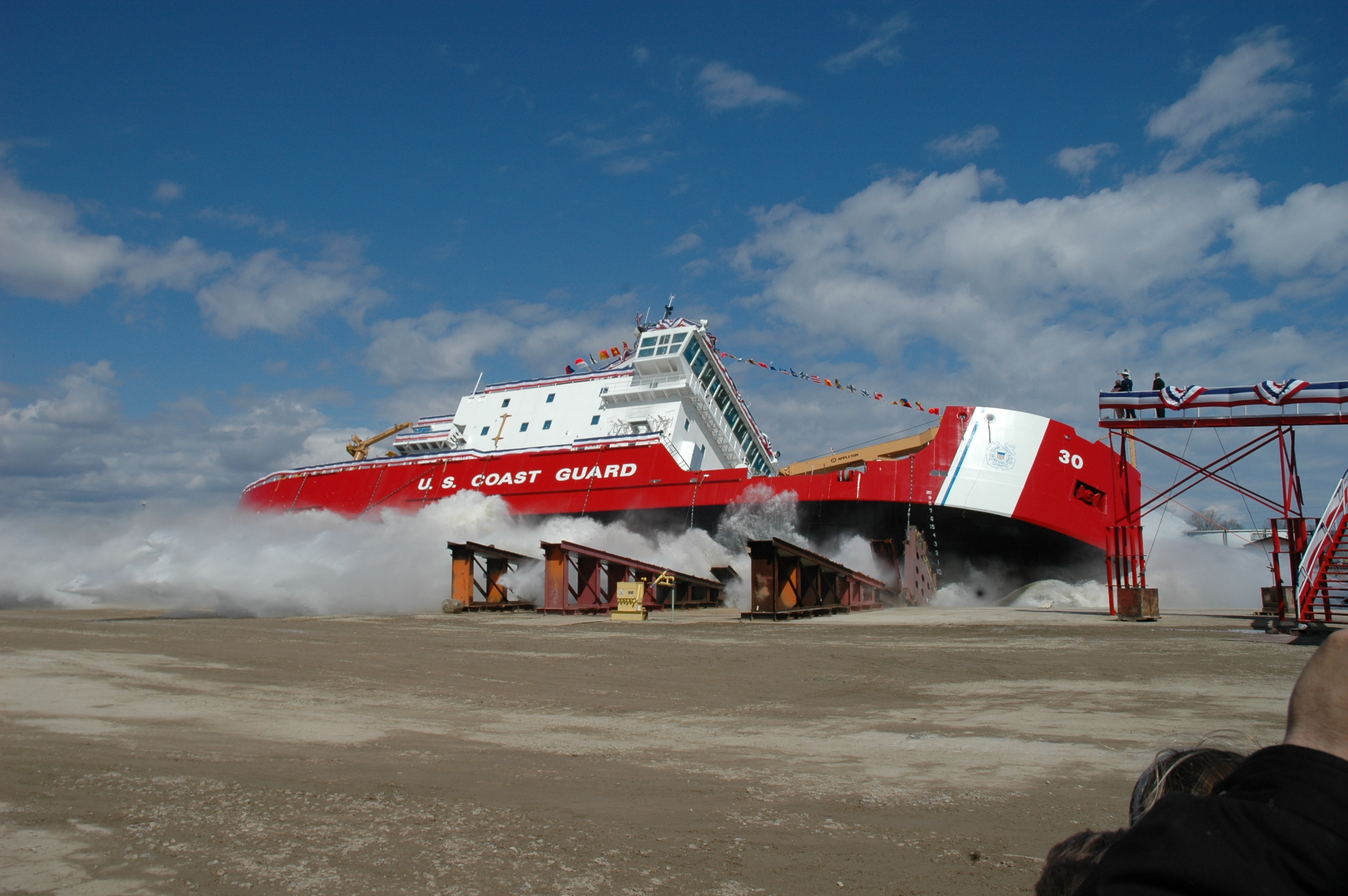
USCGC Mackinaw impacting the river.

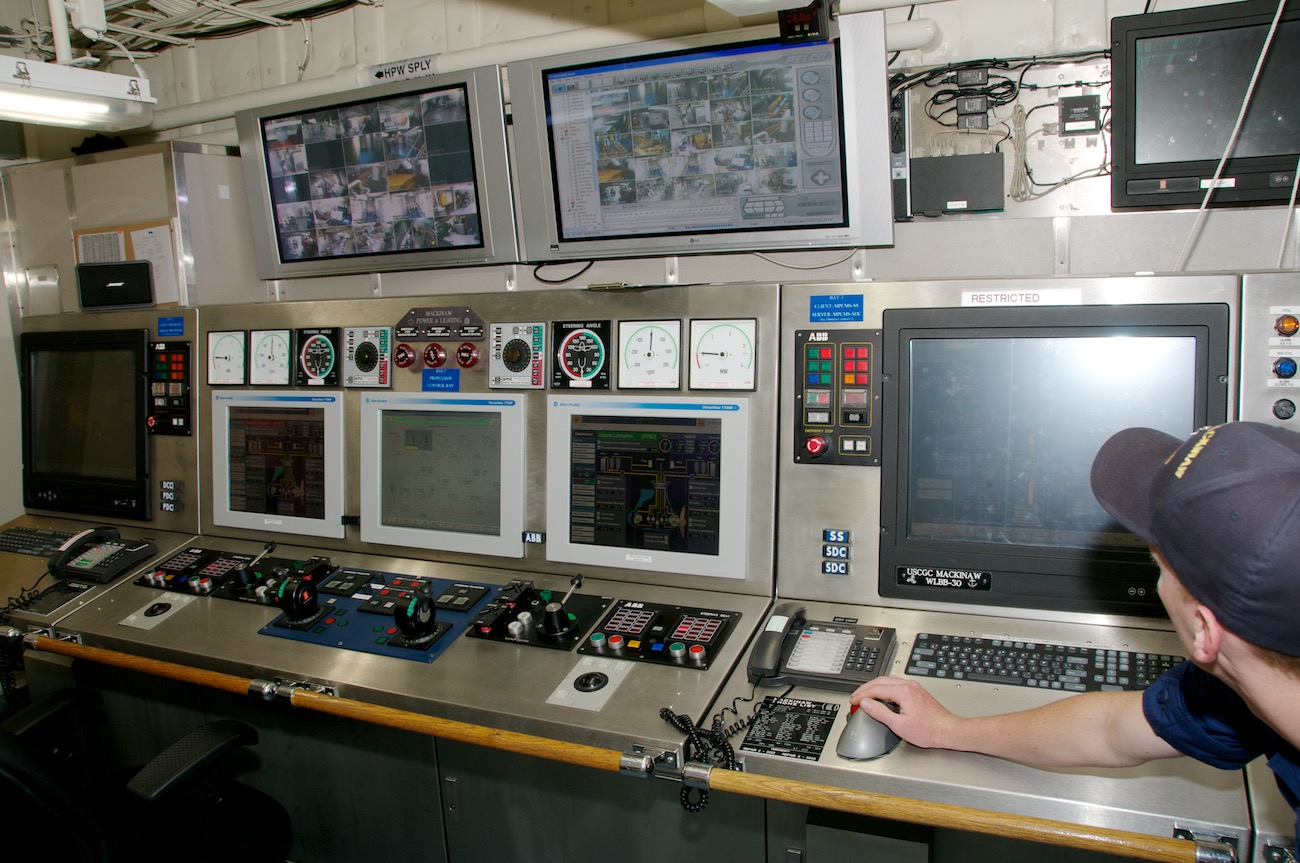
The Mackinaw's Engineering Control Center, where the engineering watchstanders monitor the ship's machinery

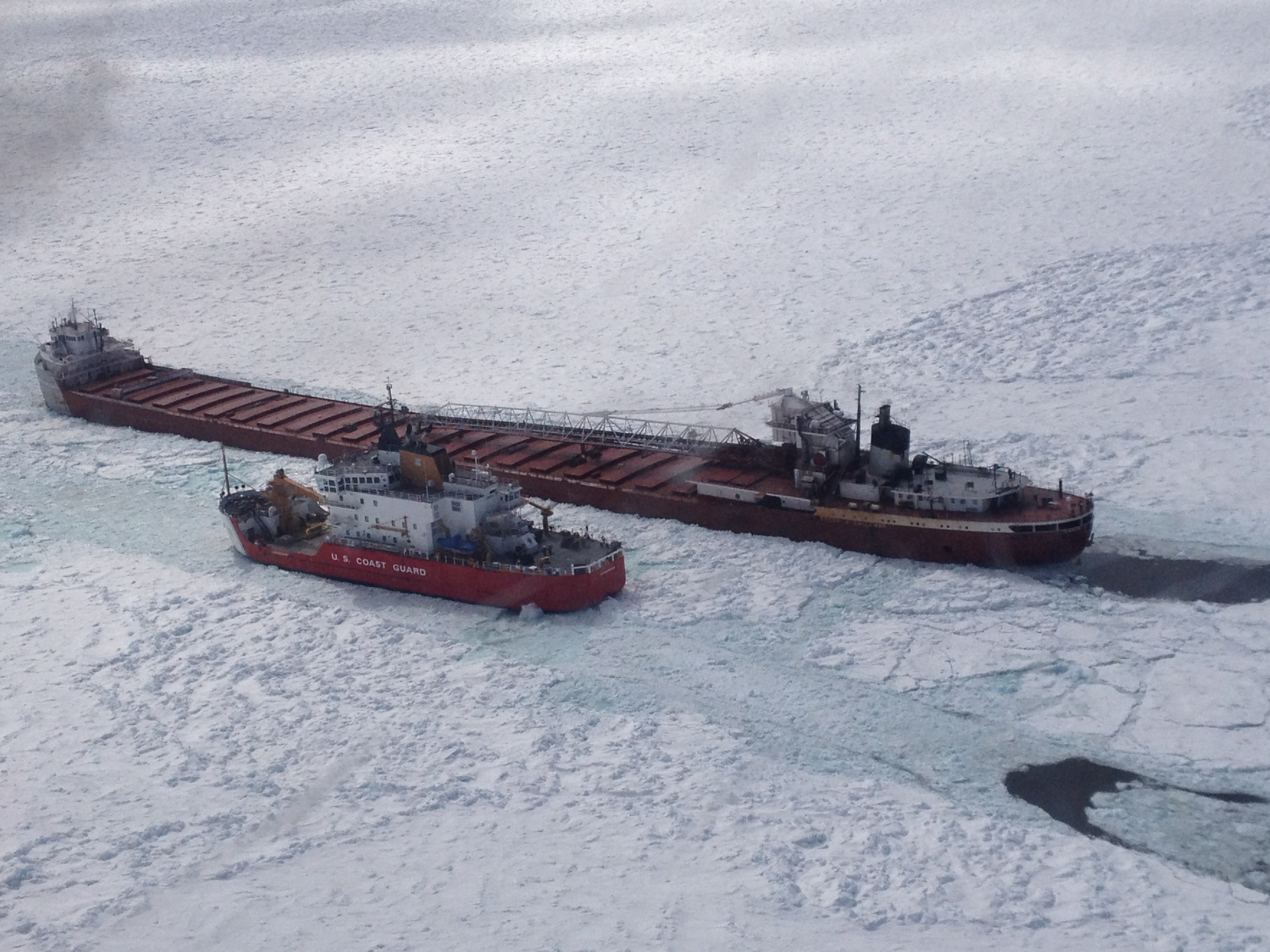
USCGC Mackinaw assisting the freighter Cason J. Callaway in ice

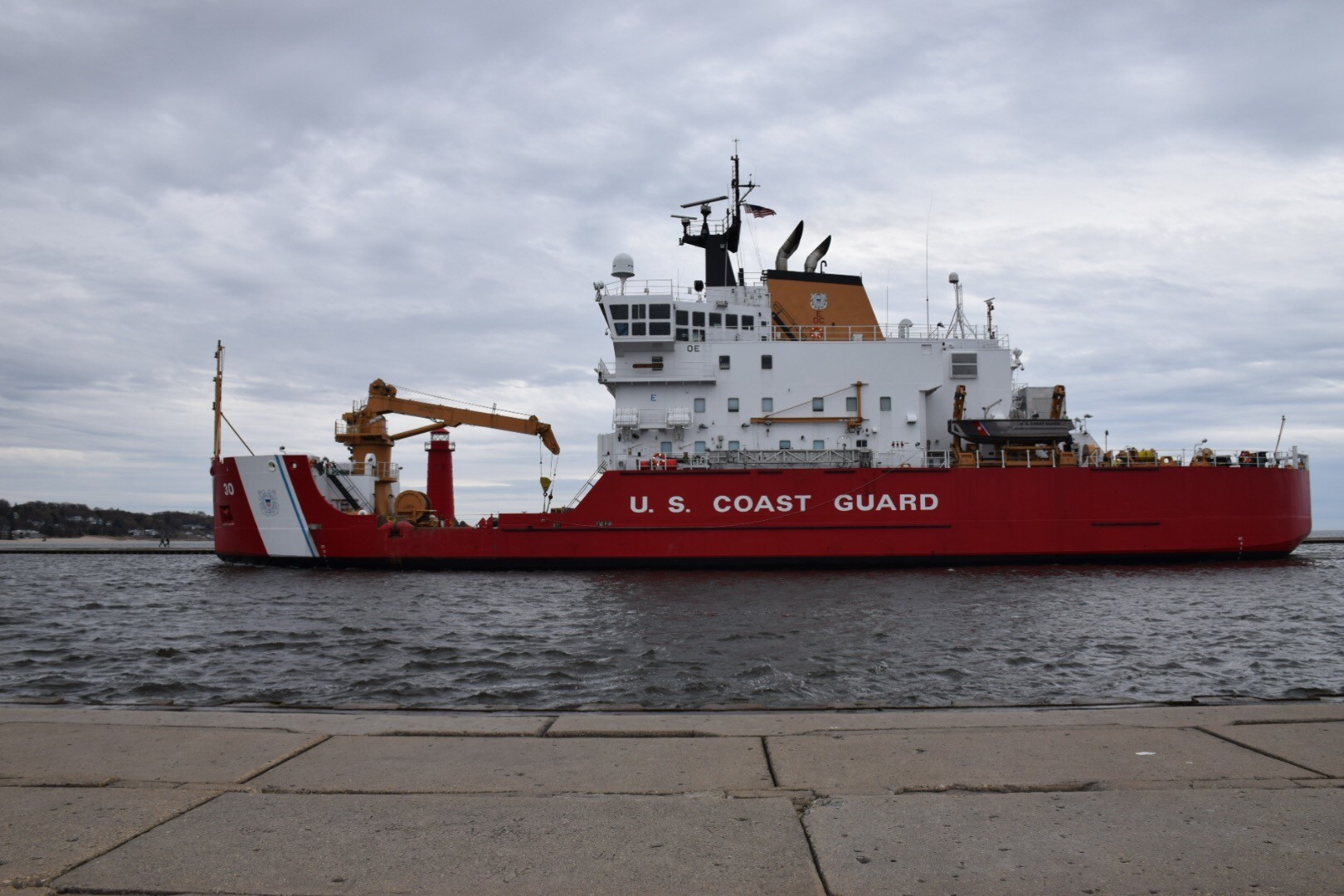
USCGC Mackinaw entering Grand Haven, Michigan May 2019
