= USCGC Katmai Bay =

United States Coast Guard Cutter

USCGC Katmai Bay (WTGB-101)
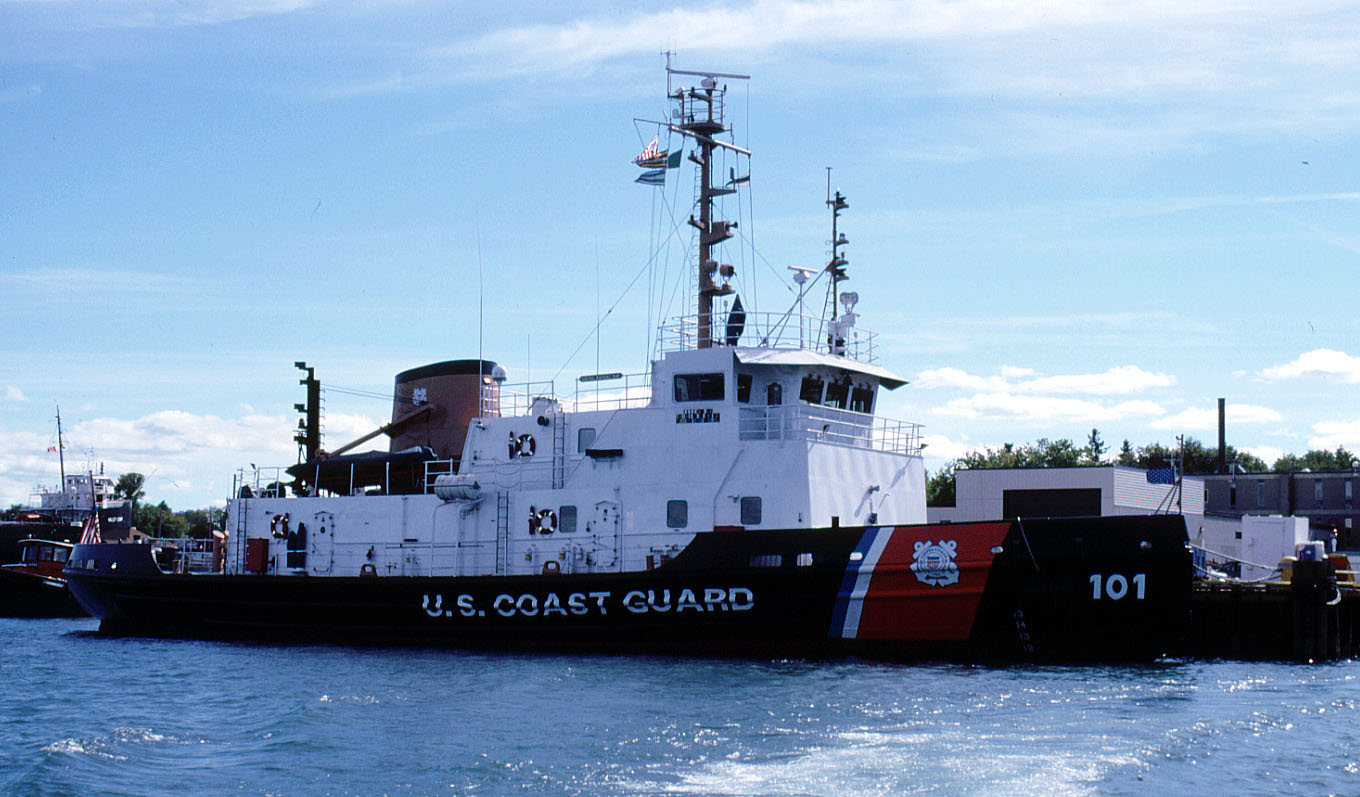
- USCGC Katmai Bay (WTGB-101)

History

United States
- Builder: Tacoma Boatbuilding Company
- Commissioned: 8 January 1979
- Home port: Sault Ste. Marie, Michigan
- Identification: IMO number: 7636212; MMSI number: 366999977; Callsign: NRLX
- Status: Active

General characteristics
- Class & type: 140' Bay-class Icebreaking Tug (WTGB)
- Displacement: 662 tons
- Length: 140 ft (43 m)
- Beam: 37 ft 6 in (11.43 m)
- Draft: 12 ft (3.7 m)
- Installed power: 2 × 1,250 shp (930 kW) diesel engines Fairbanks Morse 8 1/8, 2 stroke 8 cylinder; 2 × 125 kW auxiliary generators Caterpillar 3306
- Propulsion: Single 2500 shp D.C electric motor with single main propulsion shaft
- Speed: 14.7 knots (27.2 km/h; 16.9 mph)
- Range: 7,413 km (4,606 mi)
- Complement: 3 Officers, 2 CPO, 12 Crew

USCGC Katmai Bay (WTGB-101) is a United States Coast Guard Cutter, and the lead ship of the Bay-class of icebreaking tugboats. At 140 ft (43 m), she is designed to have greater multi-mission capabilities than the 110' Calumet-class Harbor Tug (WYTM). She is homeported in Sault Ste Marie, Michigan, operating in support of the much larger USCGC Mackinaw (WLBB-30).

== Design ==
Katmai Bay, namesake of an area of saltwater shoreline in the Katmai National Park and Preserve of Alaska, is the lead ship of a class of icebreaking tugboats designed to have greater multi-mission capabilities than the 110' Calumet-class Harbor Tug (WYTM). The most significant differences include greater horsepower, greater speed, longer range, increased ice-breaking capability, hull lubrication system, greater degree of automation, and better habitability.

Trials were conducted in Whitefish Bay, Lake Superior, Michigan which determined that the ship has a tactical diameter of approximately three ship lengths when using 30 degrees rudder and that the ship could stop in 40 seconds with a reach of four ship lengths from an approach speed of 12.8 knots (23.7 km/h; 14.7 mph) when ordering full astern power. The ship can obtain a speed of 14.7 knots (27.2 km/h; 16.9 mph).

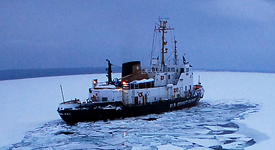
Katmai Bay breaking ice

== Deployment ==
Katmai Bay is stationed at Sault Ste. Marie, Michigan. She is helping the USCGC Mackinaw (WLBB-30) in ice breaking duties.
