= USCGC Hollyhock (WLB-214) =

U.S. Coast Guard seagoing buoy tender

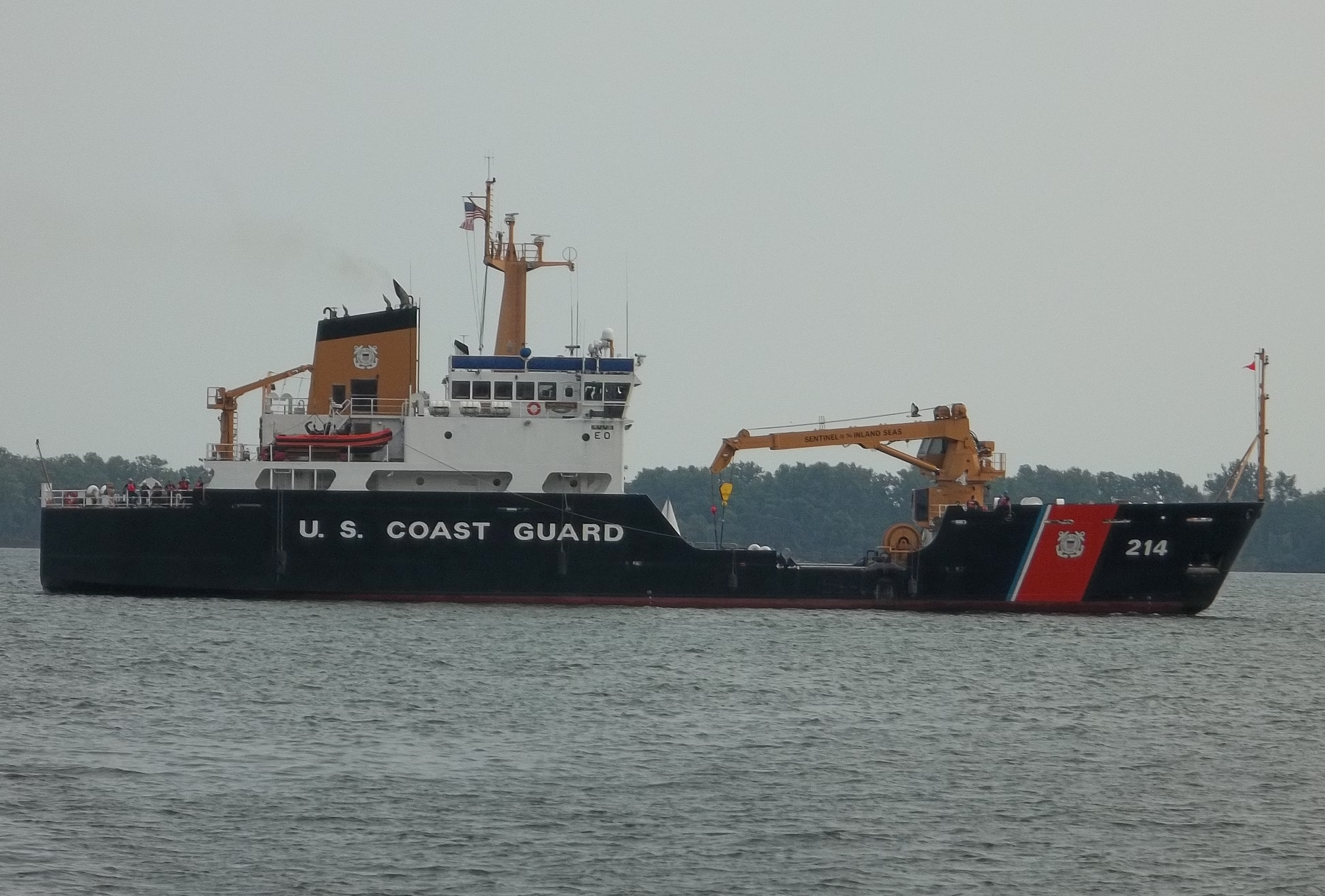
- USCGC Hollyhock (WLB-214) sailing through Canadian waters in August 2012

History

United States
- Builder: Marinette Marine Corporation, Marinette, Wisconsin
- Launched: 25 January 2003
- Home port: Honolulu, Hawaii
- Identification: IMO number: 9271133; MMSI number: 369932000; Callsign: NHHF
- Motto: "Flower of the Pacific"
- Status: Active
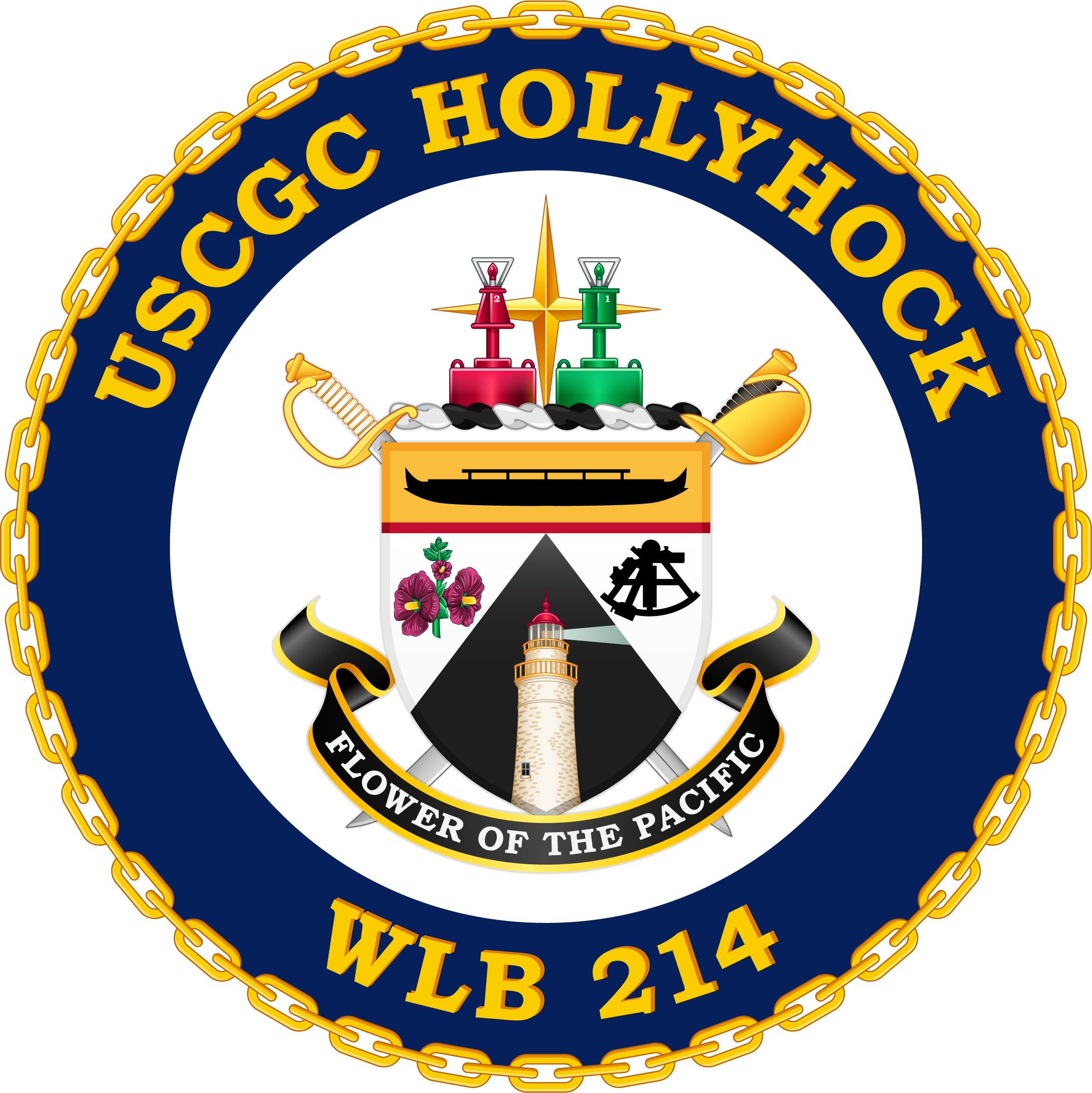
- Badge

General characteristics
- Class & type: Juniper
- Displacement: 2,000 long tons (2,000 t) at design draft (full load)
- Length: 225 ft (69 m)
- Beam: 46 ft (14 m)
- Draft: 13 ft (4.0 m)
- Propulsion: 2 × 3,100 shp (2,300 kW) Caterpillar diesel engines
- Speed: 15 kn (28 km/h; 17 mph) at full load displacement (80% rated power)
- Range: 6,000 nmi (11,000 km; 6,900 mi) at 12 kn (22 km/h; 14 mph)
- Complement: 50 (8 officers, 42 enlisted)

USCGC Hollyhock (WLB-214) is a 225-foot (69 m) Juniper-class cutter of the United States Coast Guard.

A seagoing buoy tender, Hollyhock was built by Marinette Marine Corporation and launched on January 25, 2003. Hollyhock is currently assigned to Honolulu, Hawaii, as its home port. Hollyhock was named after a previous cutter of the same name that served the USCG from 1937 to 1982.

Hollyhock is designed as a multi-mission vessel, with its missions being aids to navigation, icebreaking, search and rescue, law enforcement, and marine environmental protection. Today, the Juniper-class tenders conduct almost as much law enforcement as aids to navigation work.

== History ==
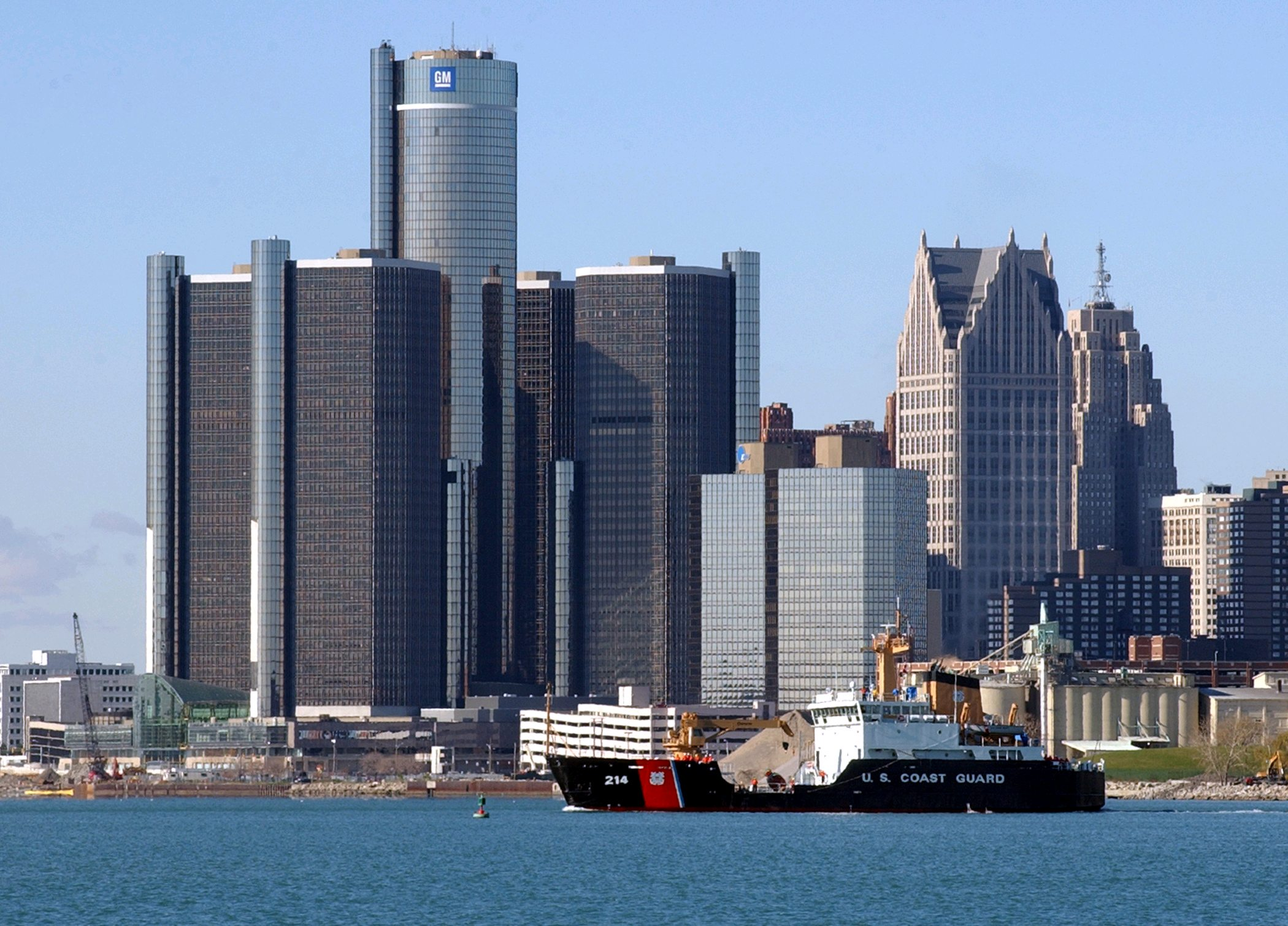
USCGC Hollyhock on the Detroit River in 2003

=== Homeports ===
Hollyhock's first homeport, from her commissioning in 2003 until 2023, was Port Huron, Michigan. While based on the Great Lakes, her ship's motto was Patronus A Penitus Mare, Latin for "Sentinel of The Inland Seas." Starting July 31, 2023, she was at the Coast Guard Yard for a major overhaul. After departing the Yard on August 31, 2025, Hollyhock arrived at her new homeport of Honolulu on October 14. Her new ship's motto is "Flower of the Pacific."

=== Collision with the MV Mesabi Miner ===
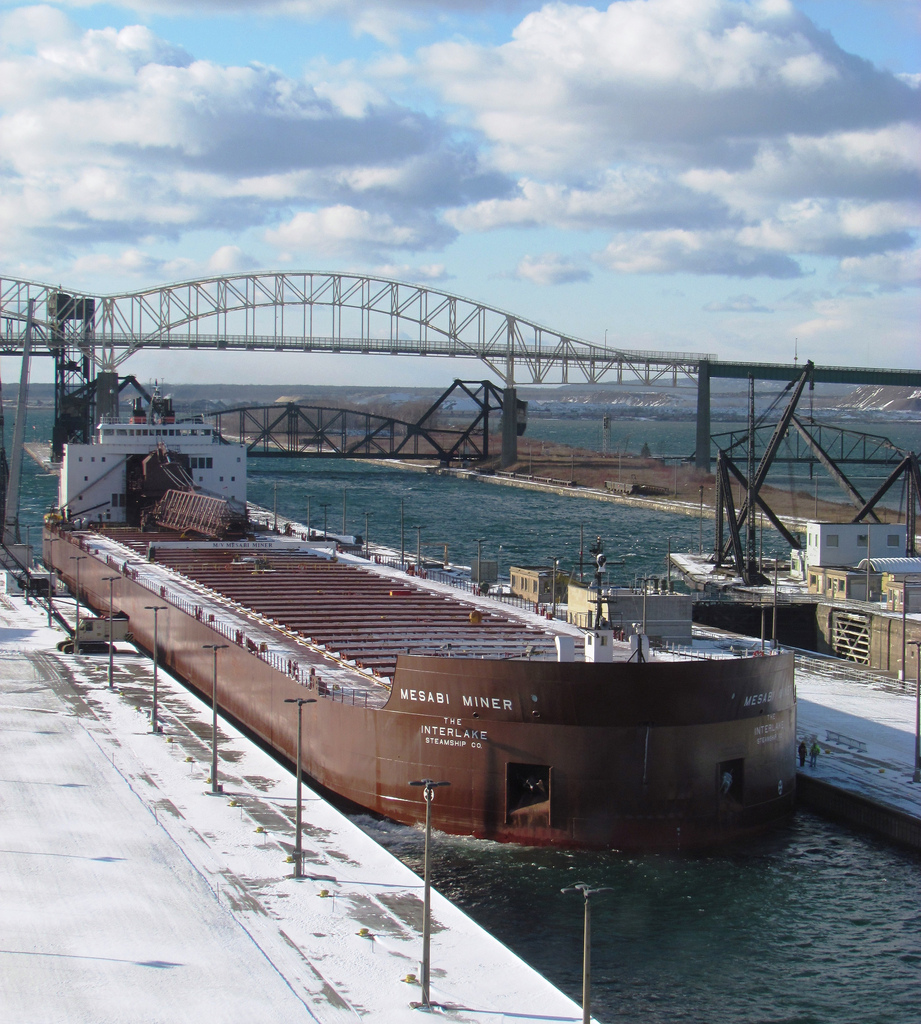
The 1000 ft (305 m) MV Mesabi Miner at the Soo Locks in 2011

On the morning of January 5, 2014 Hollyhock was breaking ice for the lake freighter MV Mesabi Miner approximately 22 nautical miles west of the Straits of Mackinac. She slowed after encountering harder ice and was struck in the stern by the much larger ore carrier. Both vessels sustained damage but there were no injuries, release of pollutants, or reports of flooding.

As of January 11, 2014 temporary repairs had been made to Hollyhock and her ice breaking duties resumed.
