= Tacoma Boatbuilding Company =

Shipyard in Tacoma, Washington, U.S.

Coordinates: 47.2664°N 122.3636°W

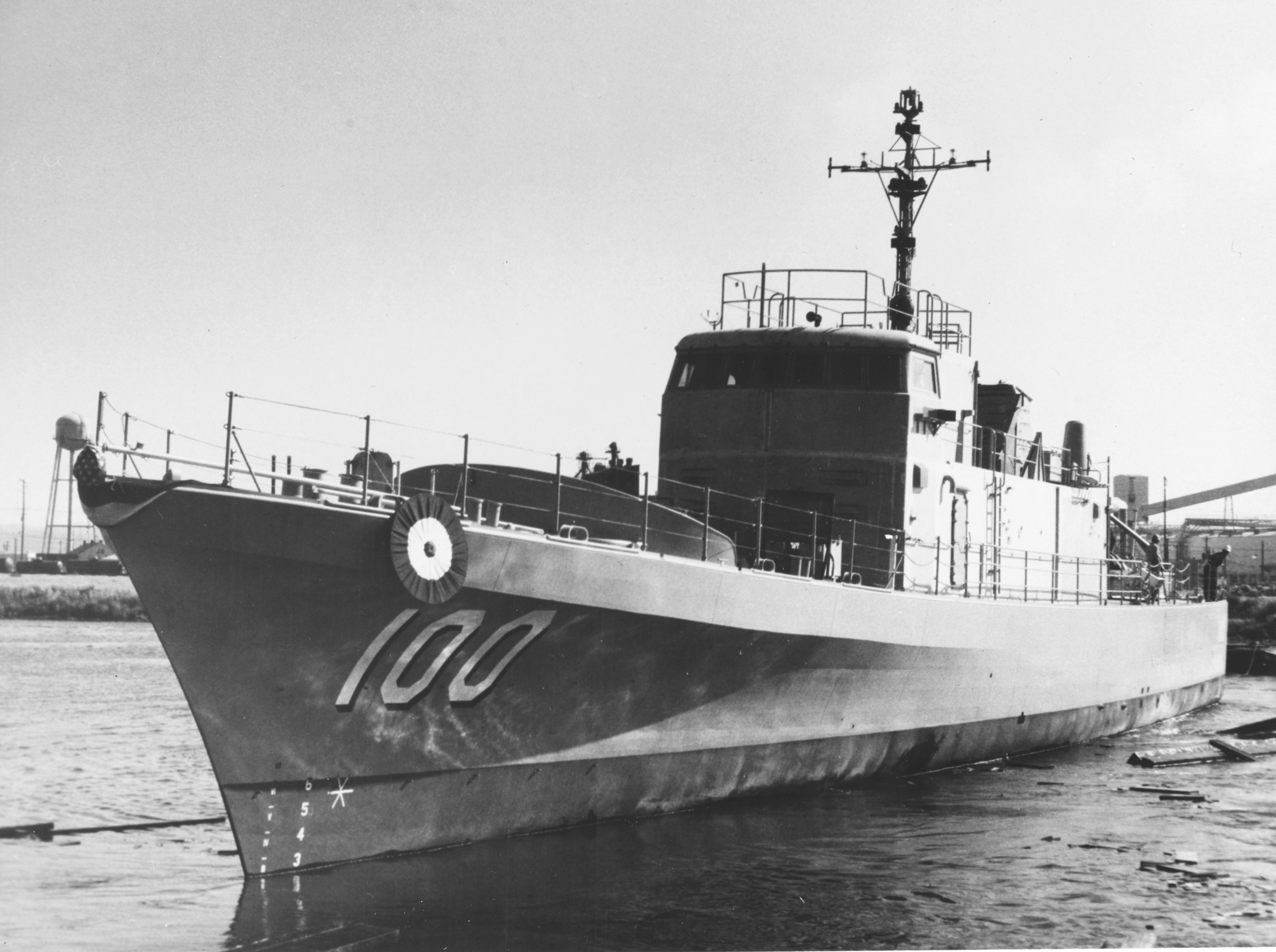
USS Douglas (PG-100) at Tacoma Boatbuilding Company on June 19, 1970

Tacoma Boatbuilding Company (sometimes Tacoma Boat) was a shipyard at 1840 Marine View Drive, Tacoma, Washington, in the United States. It was established in 1926 and closed in 1992.

== History ==
Tacoma Boat was established in 1926 and built many boats during World War II. The shipyard grew rapidly in the 1970s and early 1980s but got into difficulty with several large government contracts and filed for Chapter 11 protection in 1985. It emerged from bankruptcy in 1986 but could not recover and closed in 1992. In 1998, the company was liquidated.

== Boats ==
Some of the boats constructed include:

- USCGC Harriet Lane (WMEC-903)
- USNS Audacious (T-AGOS-11)
- USNS Indomitable (T-AGOS-7)
- USS Ready (PG-87)
- USCGC Mobile Bay (WTGB-103)
- USCGC Katmai Bay (WTGB-101)
- USCGC Bristol Bay (WTGB-102)
- USCGC Biscayne Bay (WTGB-104)
- Ratanakosin-class including HTMS Sukhothai
- Badr-class

== See also ==
- Seattle-Tacoma Shipbuilding Corporation § Shipbuilding in Puget Sound
