= USS Welch (PG-93) =

Gunboat of the United States Navy

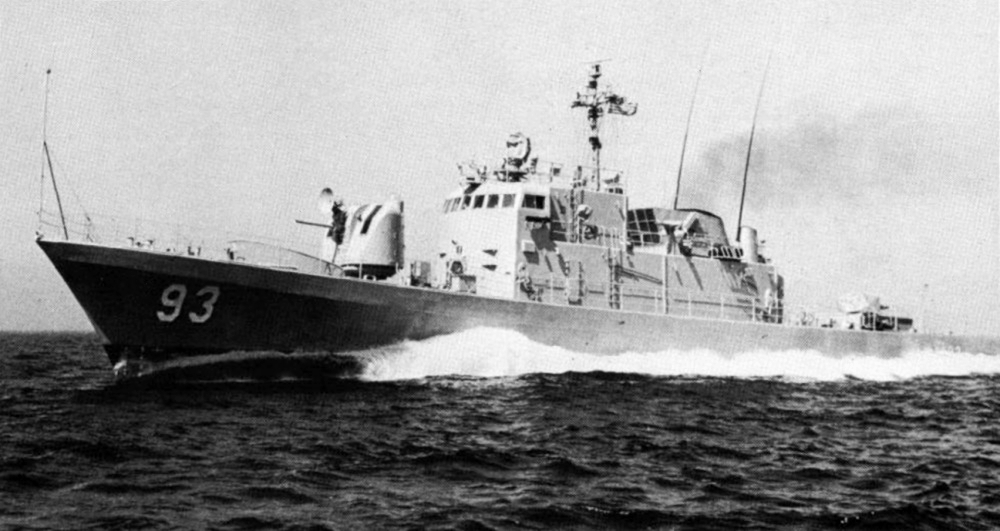

History

United States
- Name: USS Welch (PG-93)
- Namesake: Welch, West Virginia
- Builder: Peterson Builders
- Laid down: 8 May 1967
- Launched: 25 July 1968
- Commissioned: 8 September 1969
- Decommissioned: 31 January 1977
- Stricken: 9 October 1984
- Fate: Transferred to Colombian navy

General characteristics
- Class & type: Asheville-class gunboat
- Displacement: 245 tons
- Length: 164 ft 6 in
- Beam: 23 ft 11 in
- Draft: 5 ft 4 in
- Speed: 40 kts
- Complement: 24
- Armament: 1 × 3 in (76 mm)/50 caliber gun; 1 × Bofors 40 mm gun mount; 2 × twin .50 caliber machine guns

The second USS Welch (PGM-93/PG-93) was a Asheville-class gunboat in the United States Navy during the Vietnam War.

Welch was laid down on 8 May 1967 by Peterson Builders, at Sturgeon Bay, Wis.; launched on 25 July 1968; sponsored by Mrs. Roy G. Anderson; and commissioned at the Boston Naval Shipyard on 8 September 1969, Lt. Paul F. Woods in command.

The gunboat completed her outfitting at Boston, Massachusetts on 13 October 1969 and sailed for her first home port, San Diego, California. She arrived there on 12 November and, after about a month of upkeep, began operations in the southern California operating area for the remainder of the year. Welch's service at San Diego proved to be brief. On 1 August 1970, she departed the continental United States and, in company with USS Paul Revere LPA 248 and USS Tacoma (PG-92), headed for the Marianas Islands. She paused at Pearl Harbor from 8 to 15 August and then continued on to Guam, where she arrived on the 28th.

== Vietnam Service ==
Welch operated from the base at Guam for the next four years. During the first two, she alternated duty patrolling the Trust Territories in the Central Pacific and with combat assignments along the coast of Vietnam. After two weeks at Guam, she departed the island on 12 September for her first tour of combat duty. En route, trouble with one of her main engines forced her to remain at Subic Bay in the Philippines until 24 October. She finally reached the coast of Vietnam on the 28th and began three months of operations with Task Force (TF) 115, the Coastal Surveillance Force. Her main mission was the interdiction of communist coastwise logistics operations—dubbed Operation Market Time. Welch completed her first Vietnam tour on 31 January 1971 and, after stops at Hong Kong and Subic Bay, reentered Apra Harbor on 20 February 1971. She began her first regular overhaul on 1 March and completed it on the last day of May. From then until early July, she completed sea trials and a restricted availability at Guam.

On her way back toward Vietnam, Welch had to return to Guam to evade a typhoon. She finally reached Subic Bay on 30 July and remained there until 18 August. On the 20th, she relieved USS Gallup at Camranh Bay, South Vietnam, and resumed Market Time patrols with TF 115. Those operations—broken once by a visit to Bangkok, Thailand, early in October— lasted until 29 November. On that day, USS Asheville relieved her of Market Time duty. Welch's voyage back to her base took her to Singapore, to Zamboanga and Subic Bay in the Philippines, and to Koror in the Palau Islands, before she arrived in Guam on 10 January 1972. Between 18 and 22 January she and USS Marathon conducted a surveillance patrol in the Marshall Islands and then resumed local operations out of Guam.

On 22 April, Welch departed Guam in company with USS Crockett and USS Impervious, bound initially for Subic Bay and ultimately the coast of South Vietnam. After almost two months of operations in the Philippines, the gunboat departed Subic Bay on 16 June and arrived off the coast of South Vietnam three days later. Instead of Market Time patrols, Welch spent the first 25 days on station in the Gulf of Tonkin, testing the gunboat's capabilities for sustained operations at sea. After a two-day voyage south, she resumed her Market Time assignments on 17 July. Her ensuing three months of service laboring to stop the flow of communist supplies were broken but once when she departed Vietnamese waters for a three-day visit to Bangkok. On 25 October, the gunboat departed Vietnam for visits to Singapore and Davao in the Philippines before reentering Apra Harbor on 16 November. In the following month, Welch conducted a surveillance patrol in the northern Marianas between 11 and 18 December and then ended the year in port at Apra Harbor.

== Pacific Fleet ==
Early in February 1973, the warship deployed to the Philippines where she spent the middle of the month engaged in high-speed missile boat attack exercises with larger ships of the Pacific Fleet. She departed Subic Bay on 20 February for a three-day visit to Hong Kong after which she put to sea to return to the Philippines. En route, she joined Tacoma in another series of high-speed missile boat exercises before re-entering Subic Bay on the 26th. On 1 March, the gunboat headed back to Guam, arriving there on the 6th. Six days later, she entered the Naval Ship Repair Facility at Guam for an overhaul. Problems with her gas turbine engine, found during this repair period, affected her operations for most of the remainder of the year. She completed the overhaul—save repairs to her gas turbine—on 20 May.

In order to be available upon arrival of the parts needed to repair her gas turbine, Welch remained in the immediate vicinity of Guam until the end of October, but for three brief interruptions. On 24 May, she put to sea to rescue Yukiko Maru and towed the disabled Japanese ship into Apra Harbor the following day. A week later, she began a week-long, round-trip voyage to Ulithi Atoll in the Caroline Islands for a public affairs visit. The last of these three periods away from Guam came between 30 July and 5 August when she made another surveillance patrol of the northern Marianas. The parts for her gas turbine finally arrived in mid-October, and Welch's repairs were completed early in November. On the 5th, she got underway for her first extended cruise of 1973—a three-week surveillance patrol of the Pacific Trust Territories in the Central Pacific. She returned to Guam on the 24th but, after two weeks of upkeep, departed again for another brief patrol of the northern Marianas. She reentered Apra Harbor on 15 December and remained in the immediate vicinity for the remainder of the year.

Late January and early February 1974 brought interim refresher training in preparation for a four-month deployment. On 11 February, the gunboat departed Apra Harbor in company with two of her sister ships, Tacoma and Marathon. En route to Subic Bay, the three ships participated in a high-speed missile boat attack exercise with USS Midway and her escorts. They then joined the carrier's task group to observe air operations. On 18 February, Welch entered Subic Bay and, while there, put to sea briefly for another missile boat exercise, this time with the USS Oriskany task group. On 4 March, Welch departed Subic Bay with Tacoma for a month of diplomatic port visits in southeast Asia. On her itinerary were Singapore, Port Klang and Penang in Malaysia, and Bandar Seri Begewan on the island of Borneo. On 2 April, she returned to Subic Bay whence she participated in a series of training exercises during April. She got underway from Subic on 4 May bound for Taiwan to visit at Kaohsiung and Keelung. She reentered Subic Bay on the 15th, but she headed back toward Guam on the 21st and arrived there on the 27th.

== Atlantic Fleet ==
On 21 June, Welch departed the Mariana Islands, bound for her new home port, Little Creek, Virginia. After stops at Pearl Harbor, San Diego, Acapulco, and Rodman in the Panama Canal Zone, she transited the Panama Canal on 21 August and headed for Guantanamo Bay, Cuba. She made a one-night stop at Guantanamo Bay on 24 and 25 August and resumed her voyage. Following brief stops at Port Everglades and Mayport, Florida, she reached Little Creek on 2 September. During the remainder of 1974, she operated out of that base undergoing various inspections and availabilities in preparation for her assignment to Naval Reserve training duty. Early in 1975, she began Naval Reserve training operations put of Little Creek. Interrupted only by an overhaul in the summer—that duty continued until 1 November. At that time, she was designated a training ship for the joint American-Saudi Arabian program for the expansion of the Royal Saudi Navy. Welch served as a training ship for officers and men of the Royal Saudi Navy.

Welch earned two battle stars and the Meritorious Unit Commendation for service in the Vietnam War.

== Decommissioning and transfer ==
Welch was transferred to Colombia in 1983. She was struck from the Navy List on 12 April 1995.
