= USS Beacon (PG-99) =

Gunboat of the United States Navy

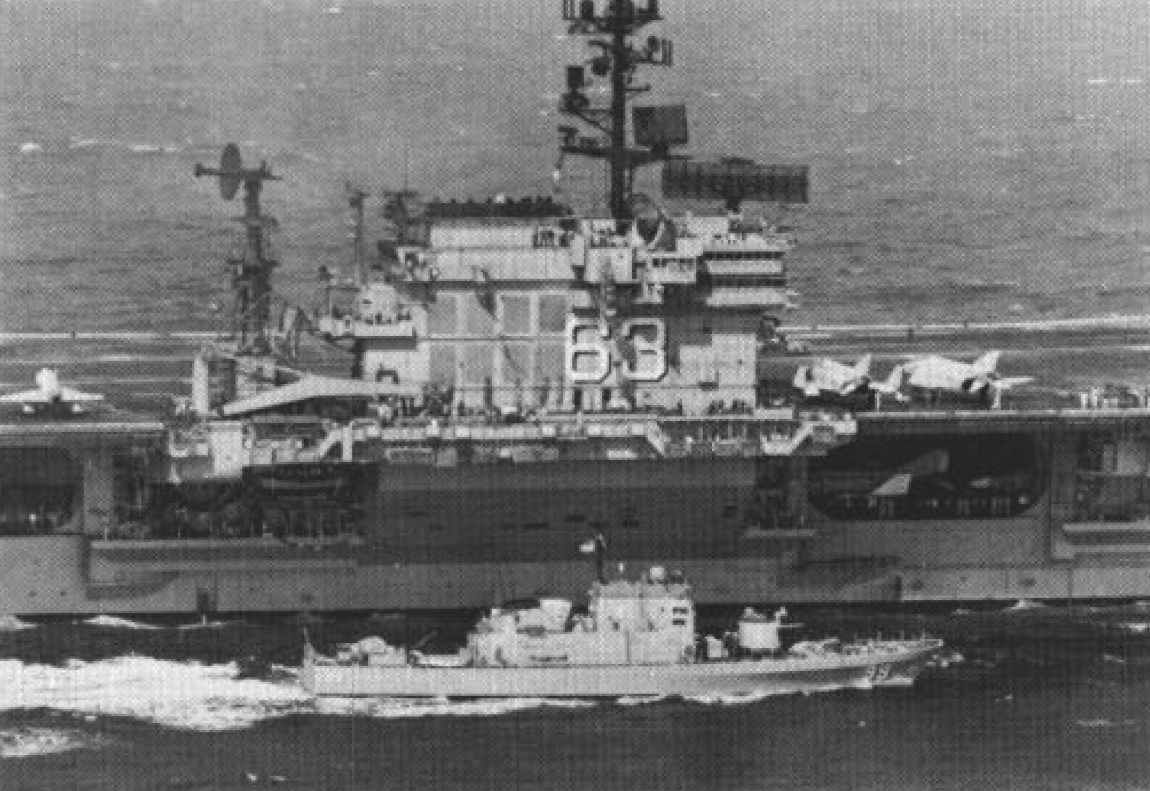
- Beacon refueling from USS Kitty Hawk, 1970

History

United States
- Name: USS Beacon (PG-99)
- Namesake: Beacon, New York
- Builder: Peterson Builders, Inc., Sturgeon Bay, Wisconsin
- Laid down: 15 July 1968
- Launched: 17 May 1969
- Commissioned: 22 November 1969
- Decommissioned: 22 April 1977
- Stricken: June 1990
- Fate: Transferred to Hellenic Navy, 22 November 1989, as PG Hormi
- Notes: PGM-99/PG-99

Greece
- Name: PG Hormi (P 230)
- Acquired: 22 November 1989
- Recommissioned: 18 June 1991
- Status: currently serving as of 2009
- Notes: P 230

General characteristics
- Class & type: Asheville-class gunboat
- Displacement: 245 tons
- Length: 164 ft 6 in (50.14 m)
- Beam: 23 ft 11 in (7.29 m)
- Draft: 5 ft 4 in (1.63 m)
- Speed: 40 knots (74 km/h; 46 mph)
- Complement: 24
- Armament: 1 × 3 in (76 mm)/50 caliber gun; 1 × Bofors 40 mm gun mount; 2 × twin .50 caliber machine guns

USS Beacon (PGM-99/PG-99) was an Asheville-class gunboat in the United States Navy during the Vietnam War. She was transferred to the Hellenic Navy, where she serves as PG Hormi.

== Construction and career ==
Beacon was laid down on 15 July 1968 at Sturgeon Bay, Wisconsin by Peterson Builders, Inc.; launched on 17 May 1969; sponsored by Mrs. William F. Krantz; and commissioned at the Boston Naval Shipyard on 22 November 1969, Lt. Larry R. Seaquist in command.

The gunboat, designed for littoral operations such as those presented by the volatile Cuban situation of the early 1960s, was equipped with combination diesel and gas turbine engines. The latter provided bursts of extremely high speed that, when combined with variable-pitch propellers, allowed Beacon and her sisters to perform blockade, surveillance, and patrol missions in confined, coastal waters.

Ordered to San Diego, to join Coastal Squadron (CosRon) 3, the ship headed south on 4 December. Five days later, after stops at Newport, Rhode Island and her namesake city of Beacon, New York, she moored at the Naval Amphibious Base Little Creek. There, the gunboat welcomed a number of official visitors on board before departing the Norfolk area on 12 January 1970. In company with sister ships USS Surprise and USS Green Bay, the gunboat stopped at Mayport, Florida, and Guantánamo Bay, Cuba, before transiting the Panama Canal on 25 January. After stopping for fuel at Rodman in the Canal Zone, she resumed her voyage to California, making another fuel stop at Acapulco, Mexico, before arriving in San Diego on 7 February. Joining the other gunboats in CosRon 3, she conducted shakedown training out of San Diego until late June. On 29 June, Beacon began a post shakedown availability at the Long Beach Naval Shipyard.

Following repairs, the gunboat assisted Amphibious Group (PhibGru) 1 in the development of anti-missile boat warfare doctrine. These tactics, designed to counter the anti-ship missile threat from Soviet-made fast attack boats, were refined as Beacon conducted gunnery, replenishment, convoy protection, and special warfare exercises through the end of the year. Other activities included a plane guard and refueling exercise with the aircraft carrier USS Kitty Hawk on 26 August and a port visit to Monterey, California on 22 October.

On 1 February 1971, Beacon and her sister ship USS Chehalis, entered Long Beach Naval Shipyard for repairs. Both gunboats underwent vibration testing and a regular overhaul until 7 May when they headed back to San Diego. Ordered to the east coast, the gunboat departed San Diego, along with Chehalis, Green Bay, and USS Boulder, on 21 June. Sailing via Acapulco, the Panama Canal, and Cartagena, Colombia, the gunboats arrived at Norfolk, Virginia on 10 July.

Reassigned to the newly formed River Squadron (RivRon) 2 at Little Creek, they commenced various littoral training exercises out of their new home port almost immediately. Those operations ranged the length of the east coast. In Operation "Beaver Tail-71", a coastal defense exercise held in mid-August in Narragansett Bay, Beacon and Chehalis planted sono-buoys, patrolled the bay, and intercepted intruder ships. A month later, in Operation "Escort Tiger", the gunboats operated off Vieques Island, Puerto Rico, and conducted naval special forces (SEAL) training exercises.

On 2 December, Beacon suffered a small gasoline explosion in her turbine room. Although she sustained only minor damage, the gunboat entered Norfolk Naval Shipyard on 27 December for repairs. Completing these on 11 February 1972, she got underway for coastal exercises in the West Indies six days later. On 25 February, however, while just off Cape Maisí, Cuba, the gunboat was struck by MS Suriname, a Dutch cargo ship, and suffered several gasoline fires, took on water in the main engine room, and lost engine power.

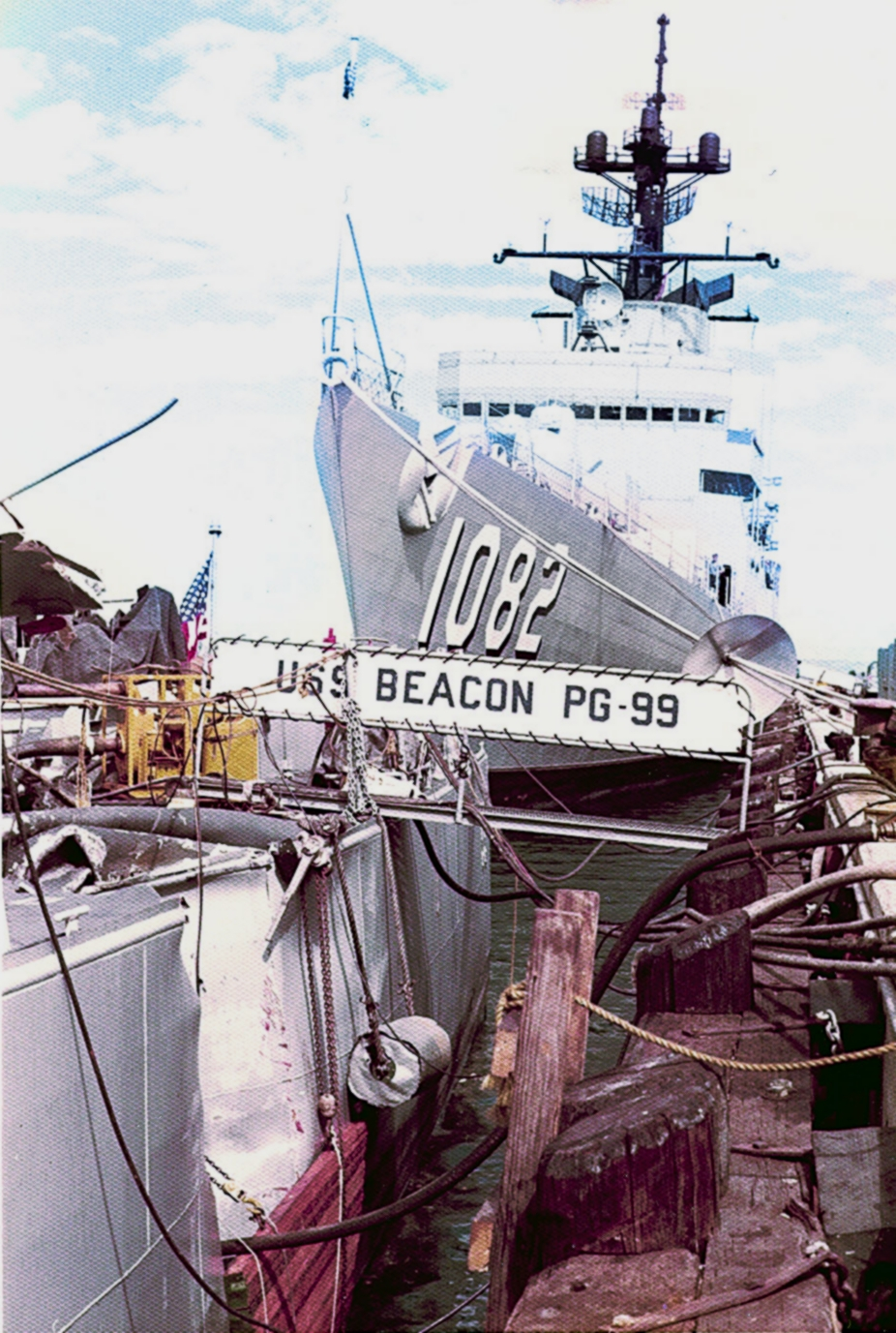
USS Beacon

After Beacon completed temporary repairs at Guantanamo, USS Shakori towed her to Norfolk on 2 April. Five days later, she entered the Norfolk Naval Shipyard for four months of repairs and alterations. The gunboat completed sea trials in Chesapeake Bay on 24 August and departed a week later to complete her unfinished Caribbean exercises. After a visit to Port Everglades, Florida, Beacon began refresher training out of Guantanamo Bay on 7 September. These operations, including port visits to Ocho Rios, Jamaica and Cap-Haïtien, Haiti, lasted until mid-November when Beacon participated in Exercise "Escort Tiger XIII". On the 16th, while conducting screen operations against "enemy" PTF's, the gunboat was diverted to assist USS Tucumcari, which had gone aground off Vieques Island. After providing first aid to the injured, the gunboat carried most of the hydrofoil's crew to Roosevelt Roads.

Returning to Little Creek in mid-January 1973, Beacon then moved to the Naval Ship Research and Development Center's facility at Annapolis, Maryland, on 21 February. There she had de-icing equipment installed before sailing north for colder waters on 2 March. She operated off Newport, to evaluate the de-icing gear, until returning to Annapolis on 19 March. Following the removal of the de-icing equipment, the gunboat moved to Onslow Beach, North Carolina, for a major amphibious exercise. After planting and maintaining acoustic sensors around the beachhead, Beacon took part in several convoy protection patrols and, despite heavy weather, successfully intercepted a dawn PTF "attack" on the task force.

On 4 April, however, heavy swells caused the gunboat to "surf" and go aground outside the harbor at Morehead City. Wave action drove the ship hard aground, and it was not until the next day that two commercial tugs could pull her free. Severe damage to both propellers and the drive train required shipyard facilities, and so the gunboat was towed to the Norfolk Shipbuilding and Drydock Corporation, Brambleton Division, on 13 April. Recurring delays and poor workmanship plagued the repairs, and they dragged on through the summer and into the fall. On 1 October, the Navy halted the work and towed Beacon to Norfolk Naval Shipyard where repairs were finally completed on 7 December.

In January 1974, Beacon returned to active service with a regular schedule of exercises and refresher training out of Little Creek. The gunboat sailed to Guantanamo Bay to practice attacking convoys during Exercise "Escort Tiger XVI" in February; and, in March, she participated in Exercise "Safe Pass 74" in the Virginia Capes area. Following a mid-May visit to Washington, D.C., Beacon took part in Exercise "Solid Shield 74", a convoy-protection exercise held near Onslow Beach, N.C., between 27 May and 6 June. Shortly thereafter, on 18 June, the gunboat entered Horne Brothers Incorporation, Newport News, Virginia, for a major overhaul. New diesel engines and a new boiler were installed, and nearly all the electronics equipment was overhauled.

After completing repairs on 10 October, Beacon, resumed local operations out of Little Creek. That routine—broken only by a visit to Beacon, New York, late in November—occupied her time through the end of the year and the first two months of 1975. On 5 March, the gunboat got underway for Roosevelt Roads and Atlantic Fleet Readiness Exercise 2-75. For the next four weeks she tested Soviet missile-boat tactics against NATO forces operating off Puerto Rico. Beacon sailed for Port Everglades on 7 April. She departed that port on the 13th and, after a brief fuel stop at Mayport on the morning of the 14th, the gunboat ran into a storm off the coast of northern Florida. Engine damage then knocked out her main propulsion system and she was forced to anchor. High seas and gale-force winds battered the stranded gunboat for eight hours until USS Salinan arrived to tow her back to Mayport.

Following repairs, Beacon returned to active duty on 18 April. Over the next seven weeks, the gunboat participated in two exercises off the Carolinas. She continued her now familiar role as an enemy missile boat—conducting simulated raids, inserting marine reconnaissance teams ashore, and testing remote sonobuoys—until sailing north in early July. Beacon then visited New York, Newport, and Boston, Massachusetts before returning to Little Creek at the end of the month. On 1 August she turned south, this time for Reserve Marine Amphibious Unit Landing Exercise 1-75 held off Onslow Bay. Beacon undertook the duties of alternate primary control ship during the amphibious landings until returning to Little Creek on 8 August.

After a brief drydocking in AFDL-6, to repair her port screw blades and to sandblast and paint her hull, the gunboat sailed north to Washington, D.C. for the official celebration of the Navy's 200th Birthday on 8 October 1975. During the 10-day stay at the Washington Navy Yard, Beacon hosted over 3,000 visitors, including the Secretary of the Navy, J. William Middendorf II. She rounded out the year with a four-day port visit to Annapolis in October, another Marine Corps landing exercise in November, and a visit by the Chief of Naval Operations of the Imperial Iranian Navy on 18 December.

Tentatively designated for transfer to Greece, Beacon spent much of 1976 preparing for and conducting demonstration rides for foreign naval personnel. She welcomed representatives from the Thai and Paraguayan navies as well as members of the Canada-United States Military Cooperation Committee. When not so engaged, she continued to carry out local operations out of Little Creek, which included participation in Exercise "Solid Shield 76" in May, and midshipmen training and orientation rides in June & October.

On 21 January 1977, the gunboat departed Little Creek for another set of coastal exercises held off Puerto Rico. As part of these amphibious operations, Beacon put underwater demolition teams (UDT) ashore, simulated gunfire support, and planted recon pick-up buoys. She concluded her part in these exercises with simulated high-speed missile-boat attacks on friendly units. On 15 February, she & Green Bay began 10 days of exercises with units of the Dominican Republic Navy. On 24 February, while in transit back to Little Creek, the two gunboats received messages alerting them to the imminent possibility of Greek transfer. After a stop at Mayport for fuel & supplies, the gunboat returned to Little Creek on 3 March. Preparations proceeded rapidly, and Beacon was decommissioned on 22 April 1977. The transfer was delayed, however, and the gunboat was placed in reserve.

=== Greek service ===
After more than twelve years in reserve at the Atlantic Fleet Inactive Ship Facility, Portsmouth, Virginia, she was transferred to the Hellenic Navy on 22 November 1989, and her name was struck from the Navy List in June 1990. Renamed Ormi (P 230), the gunboat remains in Greek service.
