= USS Tacoma (PGM-92) =

American Asheville-class gunboat

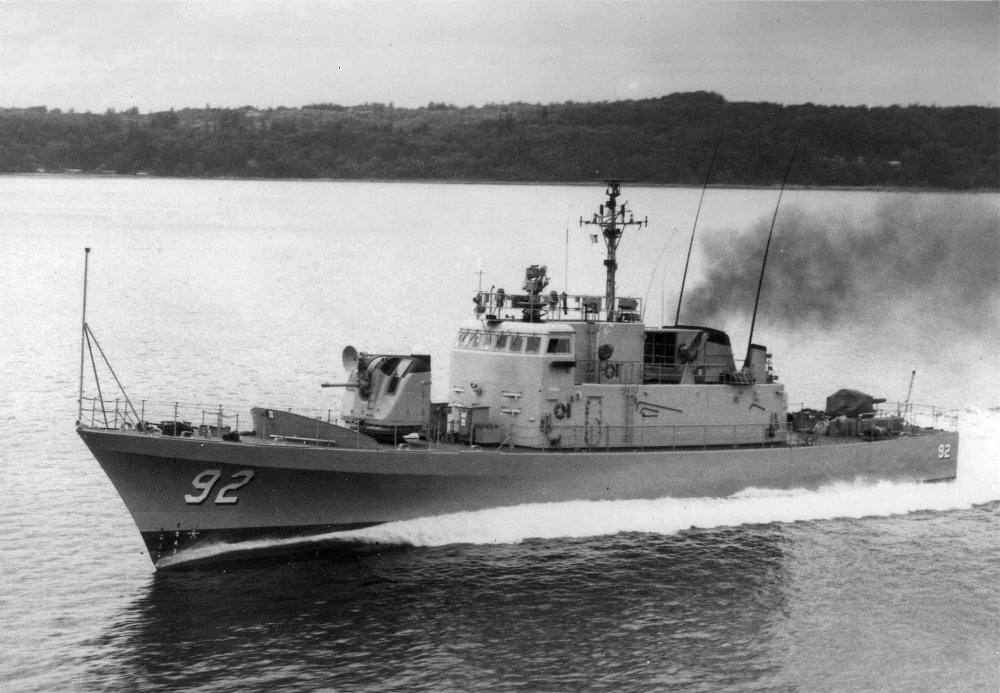
- USS Tacoma (PGM-92)

History

United States
- Name: Tacoma
- Namesake: City of Tacoma, Washington
- Builder: Tacoma Boatbuilding Company
- Laid down: 24 July 1967
- Launched: 13 April 1968
- Commissioned: 14 July 1969
- Decommissioned: 30 September 1981
- Home port: Apra, Guam; Little Creek, Virginia
- Motto: Fearless to challenge all valor
- Honors and awards: 2 Battle Stars
- Fate: Leased to the Colombian National Armada as Quita Sueño, 16 May 1983; sold to Colombia on 20 September 1995

General characteristics
- Displacement: 247 tons (full load)
- Length: 165 ft (50 m)
- Beam: 24 ft (7.3 m)
- Draft: 5 ft (1.5 m)
- Propulsion: CODOG (Combined Diesel and Gas turbine
- Speed: 37.5 knots
- Complement: 24
- Armament: 1 × 3 in (76 mm)/50 caliber gun; 1 × Bofors 40 mm gun mount; 4 × .50 caliber machine guns

USS Tacoma (PG-92) was an Asheville-class gunboat of the U.S. Navy and the fourth ship to be named after the city of Tacoma, Washington. Tacoma was the first in a series of revised Asheville-class gunboats. Some sources call these revised boats Tacoma- or PG-92-class, but the U.S. Navy officially designates them as Asheville-class. The keel of Tacoma was laid 24 July 1967 at the Tacoma Boatbuilding Company, in her namesake city. She was launched on 13 April 1968, sponsored by Mrs. Arne K. Strom, and was commissioned on 14 July 1969.

Originally fitted with a 40 mm cannon aft, Tacoma was re-fitted with a 20 mm for training. In addition to the dual mounts for .50 caliber machine guns on the O-1 level, there were mounts for twin M-60 machine guns on the O-2 level. Either could be replaced with the Mk 19 grenade launcher.

The Tacoma was powered by a combination of two Cummins Diesel engines and a General Electric LM-1500 Gas Turbine. Pneumatic actuators allowed the power source to be switched between the two sources. The Controllable Reversible Pitch (CRP) propellers allowed the ship to stop in as little as two ship lengths from top speed. Top speed on the gas turbine was in excess of 42 knots.

== History ==
=== 1969–1970 ===
During late 1969, Tacoma conducted shakedown training and independent ship exercises along the California coast. While so engaged on 16 October, she joined in a search and rescue mission and recovered a sailor who had fallen overboard from USS Neches the previous night. At the completion of refresher training, she participated in amphibious exercise PHIBELEX/BLT 4-69, off Camp Pendleton, in early December. In January 1970, she entered Long Beach Naval Shipyard for post-shakedown availability. Tacoma returned to San Diego on 20 May and began preparations for deployment to the western Pacific. On 1 August, after two months of operations out of San Diego, she got underway for the Mariana Islands. Following a week-long stopover in Pearl Harbor, the gunboat arrived in her new home port, Apra Harbor, Guam, on 28 August.

For almost four years, Tacoma alternated between deployments to South Vietnam and patrols in the islands of the Trust Territories of Micronesia. Her first tour of duty in Vietnamese waters began on 28 September 1970 when she arrived at Cam Ranh Bay after a week of upkeep at Subic Bay in the Philippines. She was assigned to the Coastal Surveillance Force and participated in search and rescue missions and interdicted North Vietnamese coastal supply traffic in Operation Market Time. On 22 November, she and several other units of the Coastal Surveillance Force cooperated in the destruction of a North Vietnamese infiltration trawler. She operated off the coast of Vietnam for two more months and then returned to Subic Bay on 31 January 1971. She remained there two weeks and then headed for Guam, arriving in Apra Harbor on 20 February. Tacoma earned two battle stars during the Vietnam War.

=== 1971 ===
For almost five months, the gunboat underwent overhaul and operated in the vicinity of Guam. On 9 July, she embarked upon her first patrol of the Trust Territories of Micronesia. Between then and 26 July, she visited seven islands in the Yap and Palau districts of the Eastern Carolines, conducting surveillance and making goodwill stops. She returned to Guam on the 26th, then departed again on 10 August. While on her second patrol in the Trust Territories, 10 August to 1 September, Tacoma visited 19 islands in the Truk and Ponape districts and apprehended a Japanese fishing vessel violating the territorial waters of the Trust Territories at Ngatik Island. She resumed operations in and around Guam on 1 September and was so occupied until early November.

=== 1972 ===
On 5 November, the gunboat departed Guam in company with USS Asheville and headed, via Subic Bay, for Vietnamese waters. On 29 November, she and Asheville relieved USS Crockett and USS Welch and resumed Market Time operations. After almost two months patrolling the Vietnamese coastline, Tacoma departed Cam Ranh Bay on 26 January 1972 for a visit to Bangkok, Thailand. There, she welcomed officers of the Royal Thai Navy on board for tours of the ship. On 3 February, she resumed coastal surveillance patrols along the coast of Vietnam. Late in March, trouble in her starboard main engine forced her to Subic Bay for repairs. The gunboat remained there from 29 March to 24 May; then she continued on to Guam, via Yap.

Tacoma reached Apra Harbor on 31 May and commenced three months of sea trials, independent exercises, restricted availabilities, and inspections. After a dependents' cruise to Saipan on 3 September and 4 September, the gunboat conducted refresher training until 14 October, when she headed back to Vietnam with Asheville. Between 20 October and 15 December, she made two patrols along the Vietnamese coast, broken by a visit to Bangkok, Thailand, in mid-November. On 15 December, she cleared Vietnamese waters and set sail for the Philippines. She laid over in Subic Bay beginning 18 December awaiting the completion of Asheville's engine repairs. Then, on 21 December, the two gunboats got underway for Guam, where they arrived on 28 December.

=== 1973 ===
During the first three months of 1973, Tacoma operated out of Guam, primarily conducting exercises. In February, she made a voyage to Hong Kong, via Subic Bay. The first three weeks in April saw her in port at Apra Harbor preparing for regular overhaul. Yard work on the ship began on 20 April and was completed two months later. In late June and early July, she conducted sea trials and various drills. The gunboat completed type training early in September, then put to sea on 12 September to shadow a Soviet submarine tender and fleet submarine operating in the vicinity of the northern Marianas. She returned to Apra on 18 September and, after a restricted availability, completed sea trials on 27 October. On 5 November, she began another patrol of the eastern Carolines, returning to Guam on 24 November. From 11 December to 16 December, Tacoma made a Christmas gift tour of the northern Marianas.

=== 1974 ===
Following repairs in December and January and refresher training in late January and early February, the gunboat departed Apra on 13 February 1974 for a three-month cruise. In late February, she participated in exercises with USS Midway, USS Oriskany, and USS Marathon, out of Subic Bay. In March, Tacoma visited Singapore and cruised the Malaysian coast. Late that month, she visited Bandar Seri Begawan in Brunei on the northern coast of Borneo. After two days at Subic Bay, 4 May to 6 May, she headed for Taiwan and visits to Kaohsiung and Kee-lung. The gunboat returned to Guam on 27 May and commenced preparations to return to the United States.

Tacoma stood out of Apra on 21 June and reached Pearl Harbor on 3 July. Five days later, she continued eastward and arrived in San Diego, Calif., on 15 July. On 1 August, she headed south along the coast of California and Mexico, stopped at Acapulco for two days, and made Rodman, in the Canal Zone, on 17 August. She transited the canal on 22 August and headed, via Guantanamo Bay, Cuba, and Port Everglades, Florida, to her new home port, Little Creek, Virginia, where she arrived on 2 September.

=== 1975–1981 ===
During the period 14 April–30 June 1975, Tacoma was overhauled in the Norfolk area. On 3 September, following underway refresher training, Tacoma commenced the mission of serving as a training unit for Royal Saudi Navy personnel. That assignment, calling for operations along the east coast of the United States and in the Caribbean, continued until decommissioning.

For the next five years, Tacoma and Welch were a part of the Saudi Naval Expansion Program, training Saudi personnel on shipboard operations cruising along the East Coast and Caribbean. The ships often served as Opposing Forces during training operations with the other fleet units.

=== Fate ===
Tacoma was decommissioned on 30 September 1981 at Naval Amphibious Base Little Creek, and at that time, was equipped with a 3"/50 caliber gun mount and a 20 mm aft.

On 16 May 1983 Tacoma and Welch were leased to the Colombian National Armada as fast attack ships ARC Quita Sueño and ARC Albuquerque, and were formally transferred to the government of Colombia on 20 September 1995. Both ships have subsequently been transferred to the Colombian Customs agency.

== Awards ==
- National Defense Service Medal
- Vietnam Service Medal with two campaign stars
