= TCG Bora =

TCG Bora is the name of the following ships of the Turkish Navy:

- TCG Bora (P 339), ex-USS Surprise (PG-97), an Asheville-class gunboat acquired in 1973, stricken in 2000
- TCG Bora (P 338), a Kılıç-class fast attack craft commissioned in 2010

== See also ==
- Bora (disambiguation)
