= USS Tulare =

Cargo ship of the United States Navy

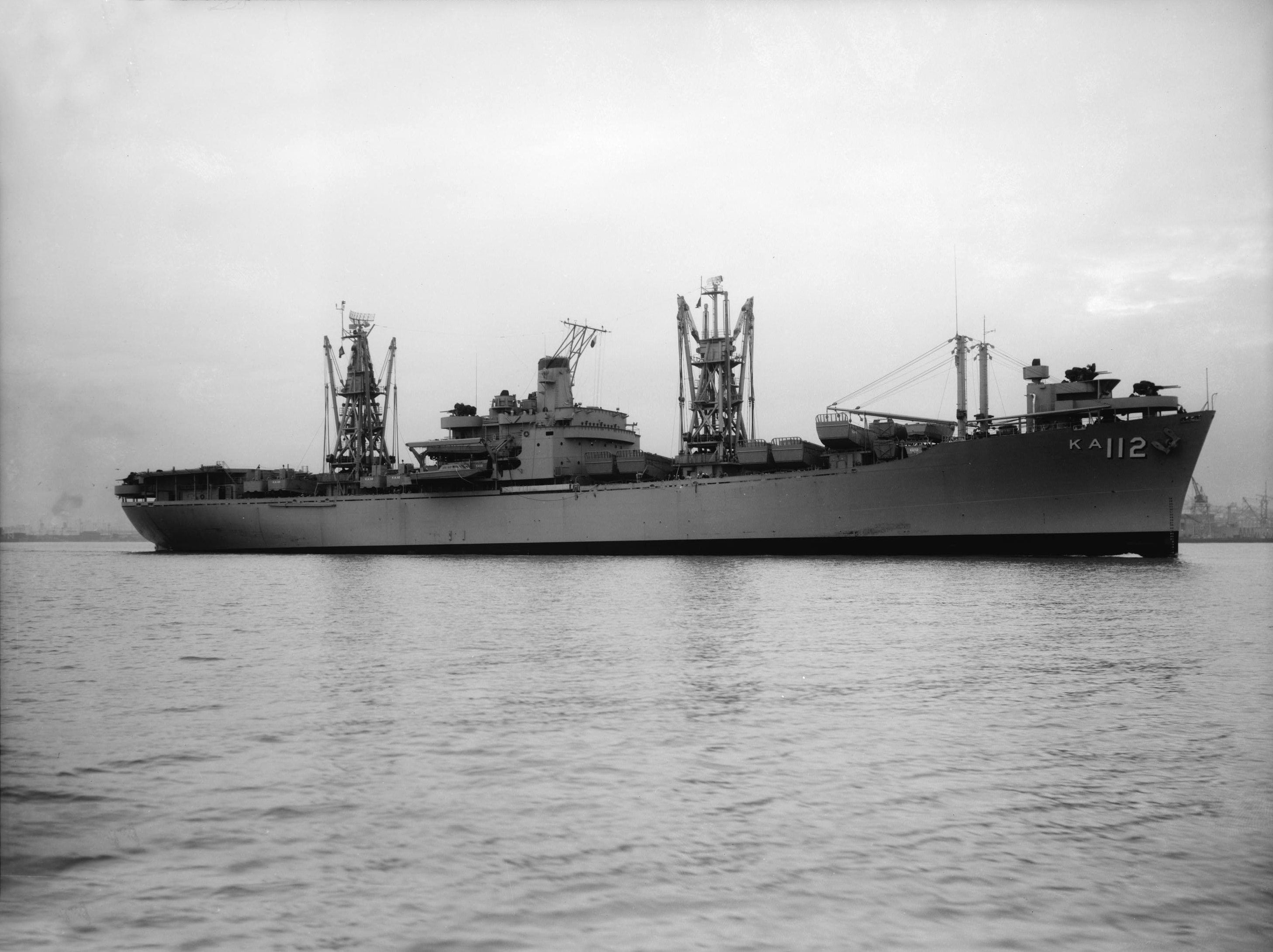

History

United States
- Name: USS Tulare
- Namesake: Tulare County, California
- Builder: Bethlehem Pacific Coast Steel Corp., San Francisco
- Laid down: 16 February 1953
- Launched: 22 December 1953
- Acquired: 10 January 1956
- Commissioned: 12 January 1956
- Decommissioned: 31 March 1986
- Stricken: 31 August 1992
- Honors and awards: 11 battle stars, Navy Unit Commendation, Meritorious Unit Commendation (Vietnam)
- Fate: Sold for Scrapping 23 November 2011 to International Shipbreaking, Brownsville, Tx

General characteristics
- Class & type: Tulare-class attack cargo ship
- Displacement: 9,190 long tons (9,337 t) light
- Length: 564 ft (172 m)
- Beam: 76 ft (23 m)
- Draft: 26 ft (7.9 m)
- Propulsion: Geared turbine, single propeller
- Speed: 20 knots (37 km/h; 23 mph)
- Complement: 435
- Armament: • 6 × twin 3"/50 caliber guns

USS Tulare (AKA-112/LKA-112) (/tʊˈlɛəri/) was a Tulare-class attack cargo ship in service with the United States Navy from 1956 to 1986. She was sold for scrap in 2011.

== History ==
USS Tulare was named after a county in California. The ship was designed under project SCB 15 as a Type C4-S-A1 ship and laid down under a Maritime Administration contract as Evergreen Mariner (MA hull 32) on 16 February 1953, at San Francisco, by the Bethlehem Pacific Coast Steel Corp.; launched on 22 December 1953; sponsored by Miss Carolyn Knight, daughter of the governor of California, Goodwin J. Knight; renamed Tulare and designated as AKA-112 on 10 June 1954. The ship was then converted to an attack cargo ship by her building yard; turned over to the Navy on 10 January 1956; and commissioned on 12 January 1956.

=== 1956–1959 ===
After a year's operations off the West Coast, punctuated by one round trip to Pearl Harbor, Tulare departed San Diego on 11 February 1957 for her first deployment to the Western Pacific. In the course of her operations in the Far East, she participated in amphibious exercises at Buckner Bay, Okinawa; called at four Japanese ports: Yokohama, Yokosuka, Sasebo, and Shimoda; visited Sydney, Australia; Singapore; and Pusan, Korea, before returning via Pearl Harbor to San Diego on 26 September. She then took part in amphibious exercises off the west coast until November 1957 when she entered the Long Beach Naval Shipyard for repairs.

The ship's second deployment to the Far East took her to Yokosuka and Sasebo, Japan; Okinawa; Hong Kong; Guam; the Philippines; and Pearl Harbor, before she returned to San Diego on 16 March 1959. In the spring and summer of that year, Tulare operated in the San Diego area and took part in Operation "Twin Peaks." Standing out of San Diego on 13 October, she headed west for extended operations in oriental waters, highlighted by a goodwill tour of eight Japanese cities.

=== 1960–1964 ===
The first few months of 1960 saw the ship participating in Operation "Blue Star", the largest amphibious operation in the Western Pacific since the landings at Inchon, Korea, in September 1950. After returning to San Diego on 29 April 1960, Tulare operated locally in exercises off the west coast, with troop and cargo lifts, until sailing for her fourth deployment to the western Pacific on 19 June 1961. Her special duty on the outbound voyage was to carry cargo to Wake Island. After unloading there, Tulare continued on to Japan. Following two weeks at Yokosuka, the ship visited Beppu, Japan, and headed for Inchon and Pohang, Korea, to take part in Operation "Sharp Edge", in which she embarked 300 Army troops with their equipment. Tulare then visited Hong Kong and several Japanese ports during the summer and early fall of 1961. En route to the Ryukyus in October, Tulare was designated command ship for search and rescue operations for merchantmen Pioneer Muse and Shiek, both aground off Kito Daito Shima. While Tulare directed the operation, USS Princeton (LPH-5) arrived on the scene and contributed her Marine helicopters which plucked the survivors from the stranded ships.

Soon after reaching Okinawa, Tulare participated in Operation "Warm Up", with other units of Amphibious Squadron 3. On 16 November 1961, the ship departed the Far East for the west coast and arrived at San Diego on 12 December 1961.

On 6 October 1962, Tulare sailed for her fifth tour in the Orient. Five days out, she assumed new duties as an acting amphibious assault ship for Amphibious Squadron 3, after USS Iwo Jima (LPH-2) had received a summons to the Atlantic Fleet during the Cuban Missile Crisis. Operating in this capacity for two weeks, the attack cargo ship steamed for Subic Bay where she loaded all supplies and ammunition originally earmarked for Iwo Jima. Primed for action, Tulare remained on alert for the first two months of the deployment. The easing of tensions, however, allowed the ship to return to a routine operating schedule. She later took part in SEATO Operation "Jungle Drum II" off Thailand, before visiting Nagasaki, Sasebo, and Yokosuka in March and April 1963.

She returned to the west coast in the middle of April for overhaul and local operations in the San Diego area, including various phases of amphibious, underway, and operational readiness training. Operations "Pine Tree" and "Cherry Tree" occupied her during the spring of 1964, before she departed the west coast on 18 June for her sixth deployment to the western Pacific.

=== Vietnam War, 1964–1973 ===
After initial routine cruising, Tulare evaded typhoons in late July and early August before the Gulf of Tonkin Incident. Tulare quickly loaded marines and equipment, headed south, and joined Task Force (TF) 76 in maintaining a posture of readiness in the South China Sea. After returning to Okinawa and making a brief yard stop at Subic Bay in the Philippines, the ship was ordered in November 1964 to the coast of South Vietnam. However, before she could join American naval forces operating off Vietnam, her orders were changed to allow for local operations between Okinawa and Japan. About a fortnight later, the ship headed home and arrived off San Diego on 18 December.

Early in 1965, the ship participated in Exercise "Silver Lance", at Camp Pendleton, California, involving over 50 ships and 10,000 marines—the amphibious force gearing itself to conditions expected in a landing in South Vietnam. After spending March and April 1965 in port at San Diego, the ship conducted underway and refresher training in May. Then the stepped-up tempo of operations in Southeast Asia resulted in the ship's making two special voyages to Japan and Okinawa carrying troops and equipment.

Tulare returned to the west coast late in the year but soon was deployed again to WestPac, departing the west coast on 12 February 1966 and steaming via Hawaii to Chu Lai, South Vietnam. She off-loaded her cargo between 6 and 9 March and then proceeded via Sasebo to Okinawa. The ship later returned to Chu Lai with 47 vehicles and 1,211 tons of other cargo. For the remainder of the year, she operated in the Orient, visiting Buckner Bay, Okinawa; Subic Bay, Philippines; Hong Kong; Bangkok, Thailand; Cam Ranh Bay, Phan Rang, and Tuy Hòa, Vietnam; and Yokosuka and Sasebo, Japan. During the year 1966, the ship steamed a total of 43,397 miles; transported 2,076 men, 8,891 tons of cargo, and 483 vehicles; spent 50 days off Vietnam in combat-related operations; and conducted 16 underway replenishments to ships of the Fleet on duty in the South China Sea.

After being drydocked at Richmond, California, upon her return to the west coast, Tulare conducted training through late September before she got underway for the Hawaiian Islands on 18 October. She deployed to WestPac with cruises to Subic Bay and Okinawa before getting underway for Vietnam on 4 December. She relieved USS Washtenaw County in providing logistic support for Amphibious Ready Group (ARG) Alfa, at Da Nang on 6 December. Underway on the 8th, she operated for the next 11 days with ARG Alfa before being relieved by USS Wexford County on 19 December. From Christmas of 1967, Tulare conducted lifts in support of Marines battling North Vietnamese and Viet Cong forces in the vicinity of Huế and Cửa Việt Base. She returned to Subic Bay for overhaul on 29 January 1968.

Tulare continued her support operations until returning to the west coast late in the summer of 1968. On 1 January 1969, the ship was redesignated LKA-112. She commenced her 10th WestPac deployment on 30 January 1969, departing San Diego in company with USS Paul Revere, USS Belle Grove, USS Alamo, USS Cook, USS Tortuga and USS Valley Forge, bound, via Pearl Harbor and Okinawa, for Southeast Asia. She arrived in her operating area off Vietnam on 7 March and delivered her cargo on the following day before returning to sea to be replenished while underway by USS Caliente, USS Niagara Falls and USS Mattaponi. She conducted local operations between the Philippines and Okinawa before arriving in her operating area on 8 July to take part in three and one-half weeks of operations supporting Operation Brave Armada while serving with the amphibious ready group.

After a run from Da Nang to San Diego, California, in which she transported Marines, she subsequently rendezvoused with gunboats USS Defiance and USS Welch on 27 October off the coast of Mexico before steaming to Acapulco, Mexico, early in November. She conducted local operations out of San Diego for the remainder of the year 1969 and ended the year preparing for an upcoming voyage to the Far East.

Getting underway from San Diego for Vietnam on 23 January 1970, Tulare steamed independently and arrived at Da Nang on 10 February. She embarked marines and loaded cargo soon after her arrival and returned home on 2 March. The ship got underway from San Diego for the Mare Island Naval Shipyard, Vallejo, California, on 23 March, and arrived there two days later to commence overhaul. Drydocked from 22 April to 21 May, Tulare emerged from the shipyard on 30 June and got underway for the San Diego operating area and refresher training which lasted until 11 September. On 21 September, the ship commenced preparations for another WestPac deployment; and she got underway on 2 November for Okinawa.

From 1971 to 1973, the ship conducted regular deployments in support of American operations in Vietnam, up to the time of the American withdrawal from that area in February 1973.

=== 1973–2011 ===
Thereafter, she conducted troop and cargo lifts to American bases on Okinawa, Japan, and the Philippine Islands supporting the American military presence in the Far East. In between these WestPac deployments, Tulare operated off the southern California coast, participating in local operations and amphibious exercises.

Removed from the active amphibious force on 1 July 1975 and assigned to the Naval Reserve Force, Tulare operated from San Francisco, actively involved in the Naval Reserve Training Program, into 1979. Tulare was decommissioned on 31 March 1986 and stricken from the Naval Vessel Register on 31 August 1992. Tulare was title transferred to MARAD on 1 April 1998 and was stored in the Suisun Bay Reserve Fleet.

On 23 November 2011, Tulare was sold by MARAD to International Shipbreaking Limited of Brownsville, Texas for $1,138,000 to be dismantled. Tulare departed the Suisun Bay Reserve Fleet on 14 December 2011 to be cleaned of marine growth and loose exterior paint by Allied Defense Recycling at the former Mare Island Naval Shipyard. On 30 December 2011, Tulare departed Mare Island in tow behind the tug Roughneck en route to the Panama Canal and Brownsville.

Tulare passed through the Panama Canal's Pacific Locks heading eastbound on 26 January 2012 and anchored overnight in Gatun Lake. She completed her transit of the Panama Canal the next morning and continued her final voyage en route to Brownsville.

== Awards ==
Tulare was awarded the Attack Boat Insigne and Engineering "E" during an exercise in Chigasaki Japan in 1957. Tulare also received 11 battle stars, one Navy Unit Commendation, and one Meritorious Unit Commendation for Vietnam service.
