= USS Grand Rapids (PG-98) =

Gunboat of the United States Navy

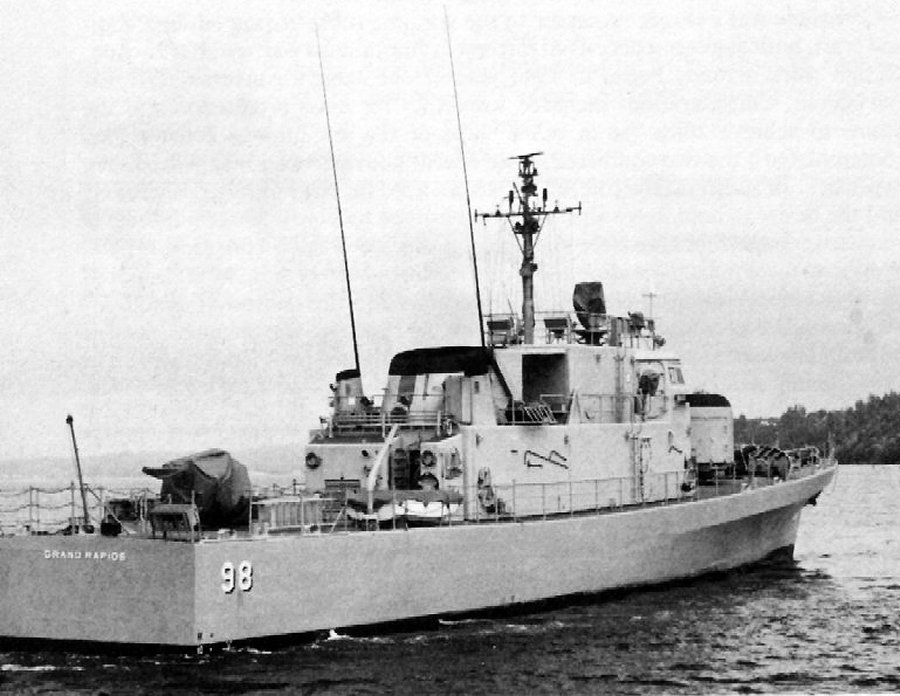
- USS Grand Rapids

History

United States
- Name: USS Grand Rapids
- Namesake: Grand Rapids, Michigan
- Builder: Tacoma Boatbuilding Company
- Launched: 4 April 1970
- Commissioned: 5 September 1970
- Decommissioned: 1 October 1977
- Identification: PG-98
- Fate: Transferred to Naval Sea Systems Command as RV Athena II
- Status: Owned by Joel Pate

General characteristics
- Class & type: Asheville-class gunboat
- Displacement: 245 tons
- Length: 164 ft 6 in (50.1 m)
- Beam: 23 ft 11 in (7.3 m)
- Draft: 5 ft 4 in (1.6 m)
- Speed: 40 knots (74 km/h; 46 mph)
- Complement: 24
- Armament: 1 × 3 in (76 mm)/50 caliber gun; 1 × Bofors 40 mm gun mount; 2 × twin .50 caliber machine guns

The second USS Grand Rapids (PGM-98/PG-98) was an Asheville-class gunboat in the United States Navy during the Vietnam War.

On 13 June 1968, the Tacoma Boatbuilding Company, Tacoma, Washington laid down Grand Rapids, the eleventh Asheville-class gunboat built by Tacoma. In August 1968, however, the Tacoma shipyard suffered a severe fire that destroyed the under-construction Grand Rapids (together with sister ship Benicia). A new Grand Rapids, with the same hull number, was laid down again by Thursday Tacoma Boat on 20 May 1969. The ship was launched on 20 December 1969 and commissioned on 5 September 1970.

Grand Rapids was homeported in San Diego and later Naples, Italy,

Grand Rapids was decommissioned on 1 October 1977 and transferred to the Naval Sea Systems Command where she was renamed research vessel Athena II.

In September 2016, Athena II was stricken from the US Navy.

In 2020 the Grand Rapids was listed for sale on Facebook Marketplace for $350,000.
