= USS Defiance (PG-95) =

Gunboat of the United States Navy

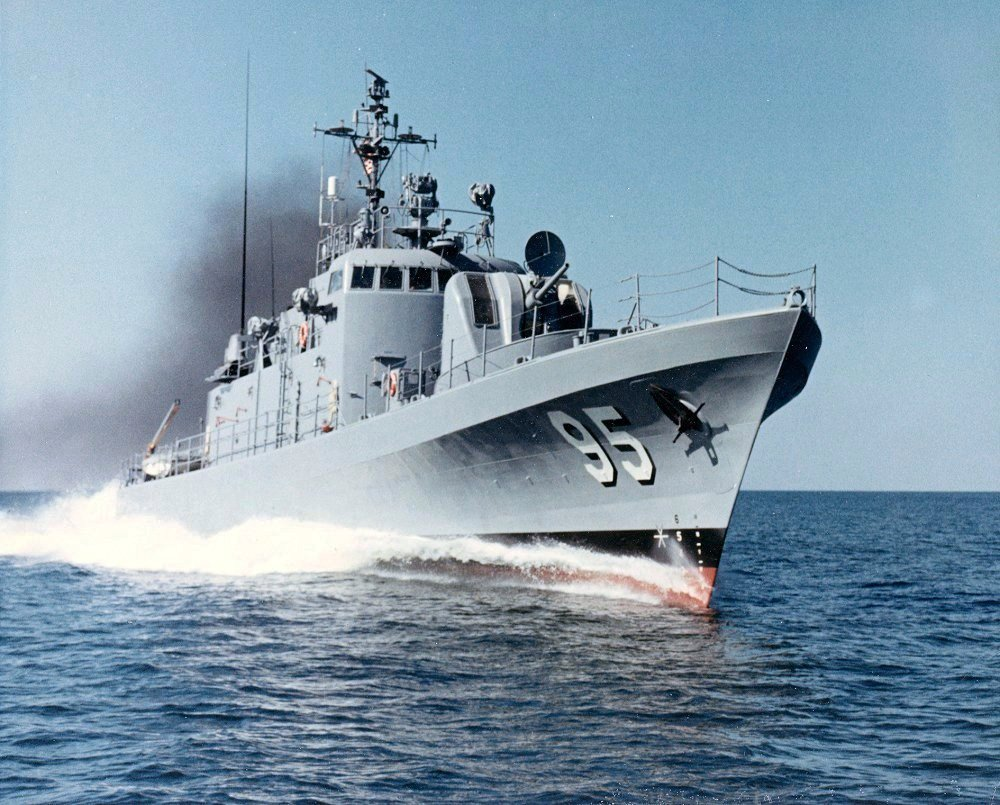
- USS Defiance (PG-95)

History

United States
- Name: Defiance
- Namesake: City of Defiance, Ohio
- Ordered: 26 July 1966
- Builder: Peterson Builders
- Laid down: 3 October 1967
- Launched: 24 August 1968
- Stricken: 6 July 1987
- Motto: With Knowledge and Confidence to Deny
- Fate: Transferred to Turkey, destroyed in 1985
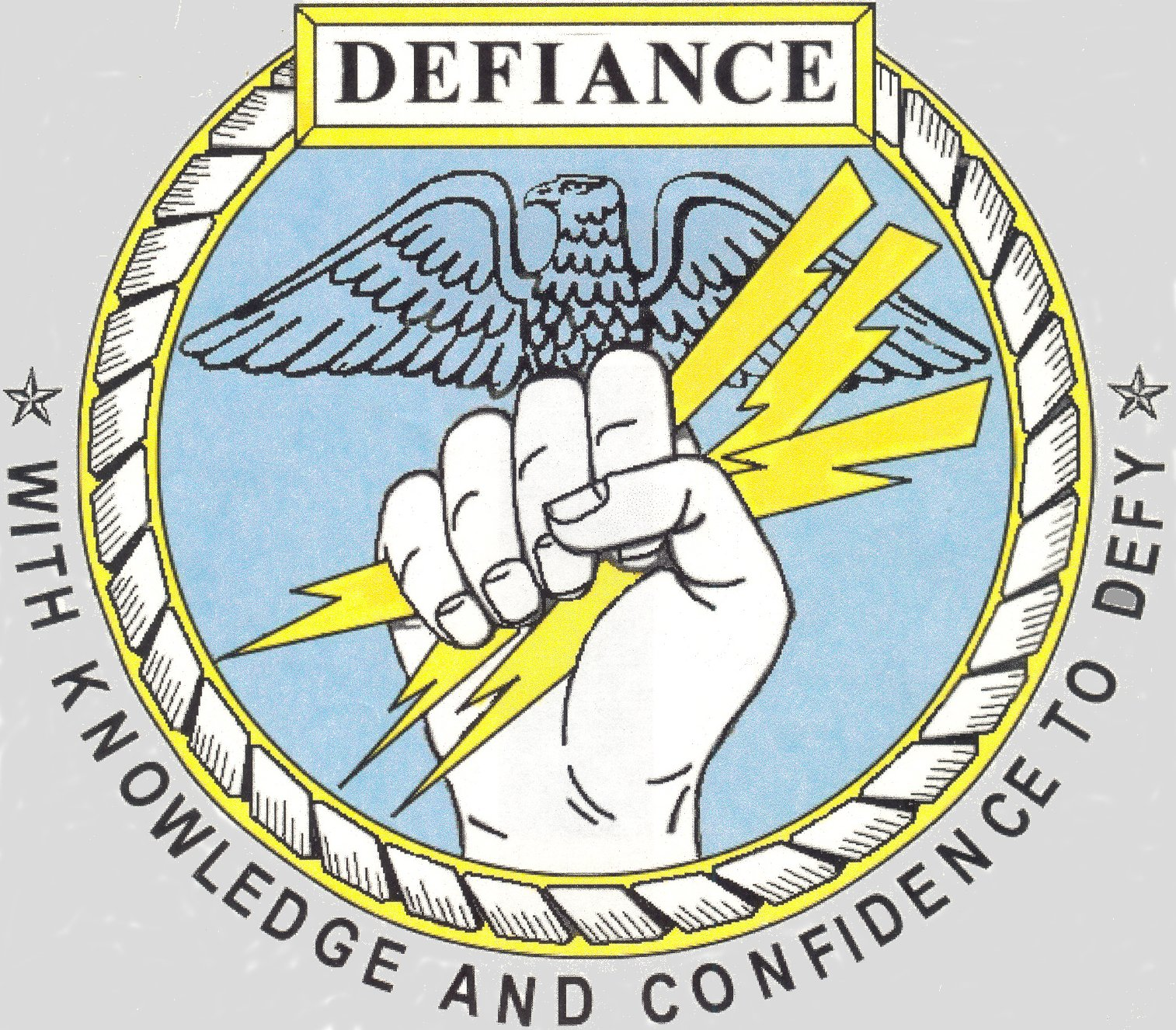
- Badge

General characteristics
- Class & type: Asheville-class gunboat
- Displacement: 240 long tons (244 t)
- Length: 164 ft 6 in (50.1 m)
- Beam: 24 ft (7.3 m)
- Draft: 9 ft 6 in (2.9 m)
- Propulsion: CODOG; 2 × Cummins VT12-875 diesel; 1,450 hp (1.08 MW); General Electric LM1500 marine gas turbine
- Speed: 16 kn (30 km/h) max on diesels; 42 kn (78 km/h) max on turbine
- Range: 1,700 nmi (3,100 km)
- Complement: 24 crew (4 officers)
- Sensors & processing systems: Weapons control: Mk 63 GFCS; Radar: Sperry AN/SPS-53; I/J-band; Fire control: Western Electric AN/SPG-50; I/J-band
- Armament: Guns: 1 × USN 3 in (76 mm) /50 Mk 34; 50 rounds/min to 7 nmi (13 km); weight of shell 6 kg.; 4 × 0.50 in (12.7 mm) machine guns (2 × 2); 1 × Bofors 40 mm/70 Mk 10.; Missiles: Some units had the 40 mm replaced with various missile configurations

USS Defiance (PGM-95/PG-95) was a gunboat in the United States Navy and later transferred to Turkey. She was an Asheville-class gunboat, and the third ship to be named Defiance, in honor of the city of Defiance, Ohio.

== Design and construction ==
Defiance was 165 ft (50.3 m) long, 24 ft (7.3 m) wide, and displaced 250 t (246.1 long tons; 275.6 short tons). She had a crew of three officers, and 21 crewmembers. She had a top speed of 40 kn (74.1 km/h; 46.0 mph), and was propelled by two shafts, which were powered by a combined diesel or gas system of two diesel engines, and a gas turbine. This system allowed for them to cruise at economical oil use levels, by only using the diesel engines, but also sail quickly when needed, by using the gas turbine. The ship was armed with one 3"/50 caliber gun, one Bofors 40 mm gun, and two twin .50 caliber machine guns. Defiance was laid down by Peterson Builders, in Sturgeon Bay, Wisconsin, on 3 October 1967. She was launched on 24 August 1968, and commissioned on 24 September 1969. Her identifying symbol was of a clenched fist holding three lightning bolts, with the motto "With Knowledge and Confidence to Defy".

== Service history ==
Defiance was decommissioned on 11 June 1973 in İzmir, Turkey, and, immediately after, she was transferred to the Turkish Navy, renamed as Yildirim (P-338). She was destroyed by an explosion & ensuing fire on 11 April 1985 off the coast of the Greek island of Lesbos in the Aegean Sea. She was struck from the Turkish Navy register on 6 July 1987.
