= USS Surprise (PG-97) =

Gunboat of the United States Navy

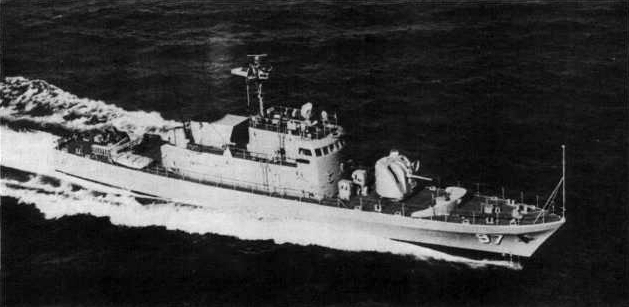
- USS Surprise (PG-97) on trials in 1969

History

United States
- Name: USS Surprise
- Builder: Peterson Builders, Sturgeon Bay, Wisconsin
- Laid down: 24 May 1968
- Launched: 7 December 1968
- Commissioned: 17 October 1969
- Decommissioned: 28 February 1973
- Identification: Hull number PG-97
- Fate: Loaned to Turkish Navy 28 February 1973; Sold to Turkey June 1987; Deleted 2000
- Notes: Served in Turkish Navy as TCG Bora 1973–2000

General characteristics
- Type: Patrol gunboat
- Displacement: 247 tons full
- Length: 165 ft 0 in (50.29 m)
- Beam: 24 ft 0 in (7.32 m)
- Draft: 5 ft 0 in (1.52 m)
- Propulsion: Geared Diesel engines for cruising; gas turbines for high speeds
- Speed: 37 knots (69 km/h; 43 mph)
- Complement: 24 officers and enlisted men
- Armament: 1 × 3 in (76 mm)/50 caliber gun; 1 × Bofors 40 mm gun mount; 4 × .50 caliber machine guns

The fourth USS Surprise and fifth American naval ship of the name was an Asheville-class patrol gunboat that served in the United States Navy from 1969 to 1973.

== Technical description ==
Patrol gunboat USS Surprise (PG-97) was laid down at Sturgeon Bay, Wisconsin, on 24 May 1968 by the Peterson Builders, launched on 7 December 1968 sponsored by Miss Marsha L. Peterson.

Surprise was a fast gunboat powered by geared diesel engines for cruising, with a gas turbine which could be cut in for high speeds. She was armed with a director-controlled 3-inch (76 mm) 50-caliber automatic dual-purpose gun forward and a 40-millimeter (1.6 in) Bofors gun aft. Pairs of .50-caliber (12.7 mm) machine guns were mounted on the upper deck amidships, one each to port and starboard.

== Operational history ==
After a pre-commissioning voyage through the Great Lakes and the St. Lawrence Seaway, USS Surprise was commissioned at Boston Massachusetts, on 17 October 1969.

Surprise completed fitting out in Boston on 12 November 1969, when she got underway for Little Creek, Virginia. Along the way, she stopped at New York City, and loaded ammunition at Crane, New Jersey. She reached Little Creek Naval Amphibious Base on 18 November 1969 and, through the first week of 1970, she operated from that base, conducting training. During that period she also made a visit to Washington, D.C., where she demonstrated her capabilities to military and civilian officials.

On 12 January 1970, Surprise departed Little Creek for her new home port, San Diego, California. At Mayport, Florida, she and her traveling companion, patrol gunboat USS Beacon, were joined by a third patrol gunboat, USS Green Bay. The three ships made their way to Panama via Port Everglades, Florida, and Guantanamo Bay, Cuba. Surprise transited the Panama Canal on 22 January 1970 and, on 24 January 1970, continued her voyage. The formation was joined by amphibious transport dock USS Duluth on 28 January 1970 and steamed into San Diego on 7 February 1970.

Surprise conducted shakedown training out of San Diego until early April 1970. Then she engaged in normal operations until 13 May 1970, when she entered Long Beach Naval Shipyard at Long Beach, California, for six weeks of post-shakedown shipyard availability. Surprise completed the yard period on 9 July 1970 and returned to San Diego. She resumed training exercises until the end of August 1970, when she reentered Long Beach Naval Shipyard.

On 20 September 1970, her home port was switched back to Little Creek, Virginia, and on 8 October 1970 she departed San Diego to return to the U.S. East Coast. She re-transited the Panama Canal on 21 October 1970 and made Little Creek on 31 October 1970. On 16 November 1970, she departed Little Creek to rendezvous with Amphibious Group 2 for a voyage to the Mediterranean. She arrived at Rota, Spain, on 1 December 1970 and shifted operational control to the United States Sixth Fleet. The ship's home port was switch to Naples, Italy.

Surprise served with the Sixth Fleet until February 1973. During that period, she participated in a number of exercises both with units of foreign navies and with other elements of the Sixth Fleet. Throughout her tour, she visited numerous ports on the Mediterranean littoral, including Naples, Souda Bay, Monaco, Cartageña, and Venice. On two occasions, she ventured out of the Mediterranean. From 18 October 1971 to 22 October 1971, she visited Istanbul, Turkey, and, from 11 March 1972 to 15 March 1972, she put into Casablanca on the Atlantic coast of North Africa.

On 29 January 1973, a prospective Turkish crew for Surprise assembled in Naples and the gunboat began preparations for decommissioning and turnover to the Turkish Navy. The Turks trained in Surprise under the guidance of her American crewmen until 16 February 1973. She then departed Naples for Turkey, arriving at İzmir on 19 February 1973. On 28 February 1973, Surprise was decommissioned and turned over to the Turkish Navy on loan.

=== Turkish service ===
She was commissioned into the Turkish Navy as Turkish Republic Ship (TCG) Bora (P-339), on 9 March 1973. Purchased outright from the United States in June 1987, Bora served in the Turkish Navy until stricken in 2000.
