= USS Antelope (PG-86) =

Gunboat of the United States Navy

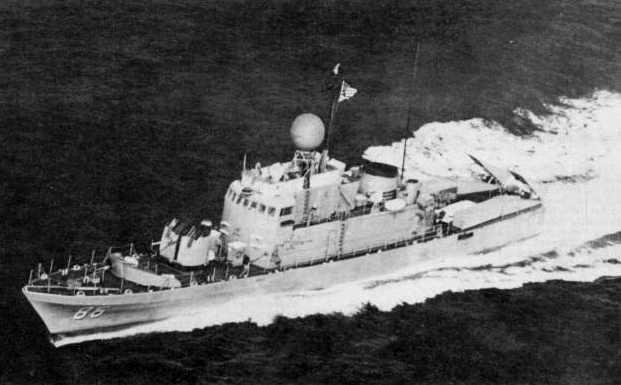

History

United States
- Name: Antelope
- Namesake: Antelope, Montana
- Builder: Tacoma Boatbuilding Company, Tacoma, Washington
- Cost: $2,000,000
- Laid down: 1 June 1965
- Launched: 18 June 1966
- Commissioned: 4 November 1967
- Decommissioned: 1 October 1977
- Stricken: 1 October 1977
- Fate: Transferred to Environmental Protection Agency, 17 January 1978

General characteristics
- Class & type: Asheville-class gunboat
- Displacement: 240 long tons (240 t) (light); 285 long tons (290 t) (full load)
- Length: 164 ft 6 in (50.14 m)
- Beam: 24 ft (7.3 m)
- Draft: 5 ft 2 in (1.57 m) (light); 9 ft 6 in (2.90 m) (full load)
- Installed power: Diesel engines: 2 × 12 cylinder Cummins diesel engines; 1,450 hp (1,080 kW); Gas Turbine: 1 × General Electric 7 LM 1500 gas turbine; 13,300 shp (9,900 kW)
- Propulsion: 2 × variable pitch propellers
- Speed: 40 kn (74 km/h; 46 mph)
- Complement: 24
- Armament: 1 × 3 in (76 mm)/50 caliber gun; 1 × Bofors 40 mm gun mount; 2 × twin .50 caliber machine guns

USS Antelope (PGM-86/PG-86) was an Asheville-class gunboat in the United States Navy.

== Construction ==
Antelope, a high-speed, aluminum-hulled, motor gunboat, was laid down on 1 June 1965 at Tacoma, Washington, by the Tacoma Boatbuilding Company. She was launched on 18 June 1966; sponsored by Mrs. Paul V. Snow, the wife of the Deputy Counsel of the Naval Ships Systems Command. She was reclassified a patrol gunboat on 28 March 1967 and simultaneously redesignated PG-86 and commissioned on 4 November 1967 with Lieutenant Jon Jared Gershon in command. The patrol boat was not named for the antelope, but for the small town of Antelope, Montana, which sent a delegation of 22 people to Tacoma, Washington, for the commissioning ceremony.

== Service history ==
Following fitting out at Tacoma, Antelope moved to her first home port, San Diego. After shakedown training and operational tests she entered the Long Beach Naval Shipyard for post-shakedown availability. She then spent most of the remaining months of 1968 in operations along the west coast. Late in the year, she prepared to conduct CNO Project CS-48, evaluating new gunfire control equipment.

The gunboat completed this assignment in April 1969 and then entered the Long Beach Naval Shipyard for an overhaul. On 2 November she left San Diego and proceeded to the Marianas Islands in company with Ready and Seminole. The ship arrived at Apra Harbor, Guam, her new home port, on 26 November. The next day, she began a restricted availability at the ship repair facility there. During the week, numerous improvements were made to her installed systems before she headed for South Vietnamese waters on 19 January 1970.

=== Vietnam service ===
Reaching Cam Ranh Bay on the 28th, Antelope began SEAFLOAT operations on the Cua Lon River consisting of "night harassment and interdiction gunfire; area fire preparatory to, and suppression fire during, troop sweeps; and mobile naval gunfire support for friendly forces under ambush." On the last day of January, her guns assisted three inshore patrol craft. Two weeks later, after she had bombarded both ends of the Rach Bien Nhan Canal, Underwater Demolition Team (UDT) swimmers went ashore and learned that her gunfire had destroyed 19 bunkers, 11 buildings, and 26 cisterns.

On 15 February, Ready relieved Antelope, freeing her to return to Cam Ranh Bay for upkeep. On 23 February, the gunboat got underway for a brief stint of Operation Market Time duty. Such service entailed stopping, boarding, and inspecting all vessels that she encountered. She returned to SEAFLOAT on 28 February, and on 2 March, while supporting sweeps ashore by troops, received about 10 rounds of small-arms fire. A week later, while shelling bunkers, she sighted and destroyed two sampans "fleeing down a canal."

Next came more Market Time duty, this time in the Gulf of Siam. There, besides serving as the command center for Coastal Division 11, she sent inspection parties on board over 350 sampans and junks between 20 March and 2 April. On the latter date, the ship resumed Operation SEAFLOAT. Three days later, she was ambushed on the Cua Lon River by a rocket patrol which fired six rockets at the ship from less than 100 yd (91 m). Antelope immediately opened fire with all her weapons, She suffered no casualties or serious damage to the ship.

From 10 through 13 April, the gunboat left the rivers and entered the South China Sea to support a force of Montagnard troops landing. During the operation, her boat evacuated 115 men. Thereafter, the warship conducted gunfire support missions until 17 April, when she ended 31 consecutive days underway and headed for Cam Ranh Bay and brief upkeep.

On 25 April, Antelope returned to SEAFLOAT duty. About an hour past midnight on 4 May, an explosion on her starboard side amidships jarred the gunboat. Investigation soon revealed a 5-inch (127 mm) hole in her main deck, probably caused by "... a satchel charge catapulted from the north bank of the Cua Lon." However, no casualties or interior damage from the blast resulted. Five days later, while the vessel was descending the river to enter the South China Sea, opposing forces fired at least six B-40 rockets at her. Her gun crew returned the fire. Antelope suffered no hits or damage. Again, on the 11th, while fighting off a launch bomb attack from an ambush site on the bank of the Bo De, she drove the communist troops from their weapons and sent a landing party ashore which captured eight bomb launchers, four launch bombs, and several B-40 rockets.

After four days of upkeep at Cam Ranh Bay, the ship got underway for special operations in the Gulf of Siam and troop support in Cambodia. At the end of May, she resumed SEA-FLOAT duties, but a failure of her number one main engine soon forced her back to Cam Ranh Bay for repairs.

On 11 June, she proceeded north to participate in Exercise "Beacon Tower II" in the Gulf of Tonkin. She then visited Hong Kong before returning to Guam on 3 August. There she underwent a restricted availability which lasted until 18 January 1971.

The next day, she sailed for the Philippines. After a brief stop at Subic Bay, she pushed on back to Vietnamese waters where she arrived on the last day of January and began "Market Time" duty in the Gulf of Thailand. As on her first deployment to Vietnam, her service was again interrupted by upkeep and occasional naval gunfire support missions.

She headed back toward the Marianas on 24 April. En route to Guam, she visited Keelung and Kaohsiung, Taiwan, and Subic Bay before arriving at Apra Harbor on 18 May. Meanwhile, she had been assigned a new home port, Long Beach, California; which she reached on 18 June.

That month she entered the Long Beach Naval Shipyard for overhaul and alterations, which included the installation of two box launchers, each containing two RGM-66D Standard surface-to-surface missiles, and the Mk 87 fire control system.

The yard work, which gave the ship an interim surface-to-surface missile capability, lasted until 31 January 1972. Antelope spent the next few months in independent exercises; fire control system antenna collimation; missile firing; and receiving new main diesel engines, additional communications equipment, and self-synchronizing clutches.

=== Atlantic Fleet service ===
On 10 July, the gunboat began preparations for a transfer to the Atlantic Fleet. Two weeks later, she got underway in company with Ready and Barnstable County and proceeded via Acapulco, Mexico, to the Isthmus of Panama. She transited the Panama Canal on 7 August, and reached Little Creek, Virginia, on 14 August. On 30 August, she, Ready, and Graham County sailed for the Mediterranean. On 1 September, Antelope's home port was changed to Naples, Italy. Following stops at Ponta Delgada (Azores), and at Rota, Spain, the warships reached Naples on 17 September. Antelope's operations for the remainder of the year included missile handling exercises at Augusta Bay, Sicily; KOMAR simulation operations with Task Group (TG) 60.2; NATO Exercise "National Week XIV"; her firing of a missile with a warhead; a visit to İzmir, Turkey; and special warfare operations at Souda Bay, Crete.

The gunboat's service in 1973 was much like that which she had performed during her last three months of 1972. Highlights during the first six months were: an amphibious exercise at the Monte Romano Training Anchorage from 24 to 29 January and a visit to Monaco during the following week; "National Week XV" Exercise from 19 to 24 February; towing ITASS sonic test device late in February; an amphibious exercise at Portoscuso, Sardinia, and a visit to Bizerte, Tunisia, in April; a missile tracking exercise at Souda Bay at the end of May, NATO Exercise "Dawn Patrol 73" in June; and bilateral operations with Greek fast patrol boats which continued from 21 July to 10 August. During the latter half of the year, she took part in international Operation Zeus in the vicinity of Thasos island, Greece, from 21 to 29 August and NATO Exercise "Deep Furrow 73" from 20 to 30 September, before firing a missile off Crete on 1 October. This shot scored a direct hit on a Mk 35 SEPTAR target boat and was the first successful firing in the Mediterranean of the telemetered standard surface-to-surface missile system.

The ship visited Barcelona, Spain, in mid-January 1974; took part in amphibious exercises at Gythion, Greece, from 3 to 10 February; and participated in Exercise "National Week XVI" from 13 to 21 February. Next, she devoted more than four months to an overhaul in a private shipyard at Naples.

A short visit to Souda Bay, Crete; surveillance operations in the western Mediterranean; and visits to Málaga, Spain, took up most of July. Then, after a stop at the Spanish island of Mallorca in the Balearics from 29 July to 1 August, she remained at Naples from 4 to 20 August and then returned to Spain for visits to Cartagena and Málaga before putting to sea on 31 August for a fortnight of surveillance operations in the western Mediterranean. Exercise "Flintlock 74" out of Venice lasted from 3 to 17 October. Antelope next returned to Naples and remained there until getting underway early in February 1975 for missile exercises. Thereafter, during more than two years, her operations spanned the Mediterranean from east to west and from southern Europe to the shores of North Africa. She left the "Middle Sea" in August 1975 for a brief visit to Casablanca, Morocco.

Her subsequent missions during this latter part of her service with the 6th Fleet were quite like those she had already performed. She visited many of the same ports; took part in similar exercises; and, between 10 January and 7 May 1976, underwent another overhaul at Naples. On 1 April 1977, she was reassigned to Nisida Island as her home port.

=== Decommissioning ===
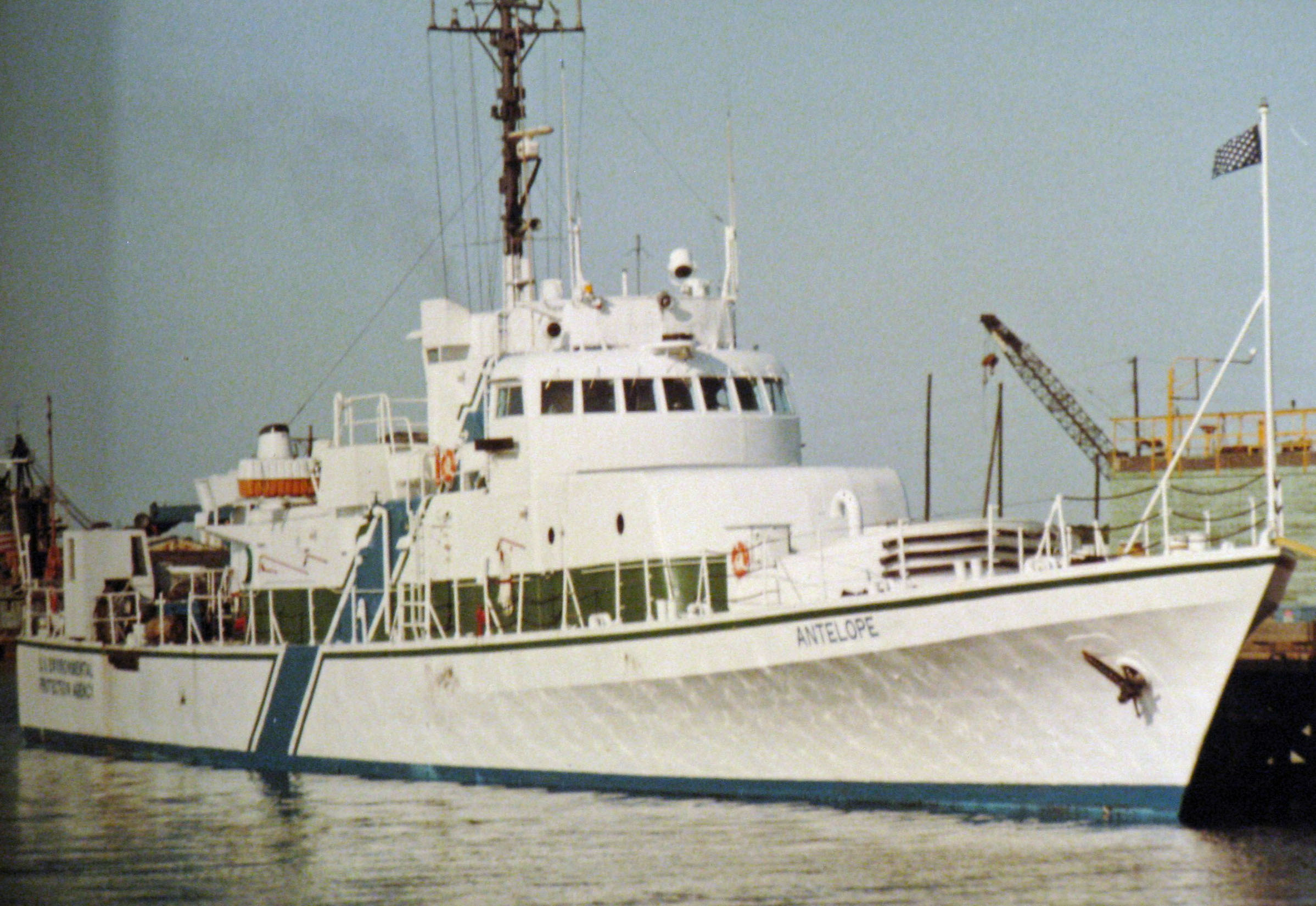
OSV Antelope, then owned by the US EPA. Picture taken at Naval Station Norfolk in 1983

Her deployment to European waters ended on the last day of July 1977, and she departed Rota, Spain, bound for home. Following stops in the Azores and at Bermuda, she reached Little Creek, Virginia on 21 August and was decommissioned there on 1 October 1977. She was transferred to the Environmental Protection Agency on 17 January 1978 and was placed in service on Lake Michigan as a survey vessel gathering data to determine the impact of waste disposal upon the Great Lakes. Antelope was renamed Oceanographic Survey Vessel (OSV) Peter W. Anderson in June 1985. As of 2009, she is no longer in service to the EPA, replaced by OSV Bold, ex-Bold.

== Notes ==
Citations

== Bibliography ==
Online resources

- "Etamin". Dictionary of American Naval Fighting Ships. Naval History and Heritage Command. 17 June 2015. This article incorporates text from this source, which is in the public domain.
- "Tacoma Boatbuilding, Tacoma WA". ShipbuildingHistory.com. 19 March 2014.
- "USS Antelope (PG-86)". NavSource.
