= Asheville-class gunboat =

Gunboat class of ships of the United States Navy

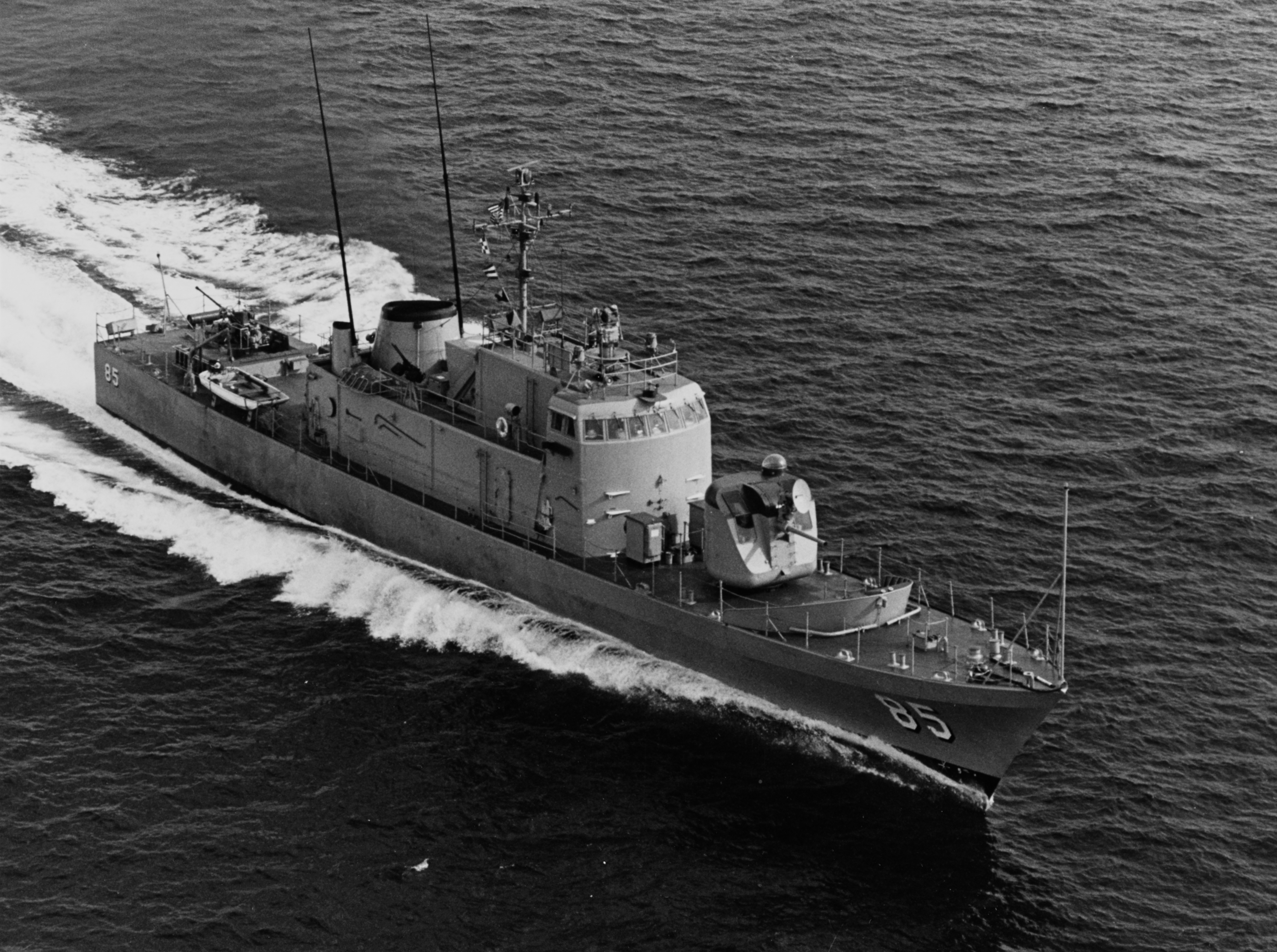
- USS Gallup (PG-85) in June 1967

Class overview
- Name: Asheville class
- Preceded by: PGM-39 class
- Succeeded by: PSMM Mk5 multi-purpose patrol boat (PSMM)
- Built: 1966–1971
- Completed: 17
- Lost: 1

General characteristics
- Type: PGM motor gunboat
- Displacement: 240 long tons (244 t)
- Length: 164 ft 6 in (50.1 m)
- Beam: 24 ft (7.3 m)
- Draft: 9 ft 6 in (2.9 m)
- Propulsion: CODOG; 2 × Cummins VT12-875 diesel; 1,450 hp (1.08 MW); General Electric LM1500 marine gas turbine
- Speed: 16 kn (30 km/h) max on diesels; 42 kn (78 km/h) max on turbine
- Range: 1,700 nmi (3,100 km)
- Complement: 24 crew (4 officers)
- Sensors & processing systems: Weapons control: Mark 63 fire-control system; Radar: Sperry AN/SPS-53; I/J-band; Fire control: Western Electric AN/SPG-50; I/J-band
- Armament: Guns: 1 × USN 3 in (76 mm)/50 Mk 34; 50 rounds/min to 7 nmi (13 km); weight of shell 6 kg.; 4 × 0.50 in (12.7 mm) machine guns (2 × 2); 1 × Bofors 40 mm/60(56) Mk 10.; Missiles: Some units had the 40 mm replaced with various missile configurations

The Asheville-class gunboats were a class of small warships built for the United States Navy in response to the Cuban Missile Crisis. The class is named for a city in western North Carolina and the seat of Buncombe County. All Asheville-class gunboats have since been donated to museums, scheduled for scrapping, or transferred to the Greek, Turkish, Colombian and South Korean Navies. The last two Asheville-class gunboats in US service were USS Chehalis and USS Grand Rapids, which were operated by the Naval Surface Warfare Center until they were stricken in 2016.

== Origination ==
The Asheville-class gunboats were originally designated PGM motor gunboats, but were reclassified in 1967 as PG patrol combatant ships.

The Asheville class employed a combined diesel or gas turbine (CODOG) propulsion system; twin Cummins diesel engines for endurance, and a GE LM1500 gas turbine for high-speed dash. Engine controls were operated by pneumatics. The controllable reversible pitch propeller allowed them to stop in less than two ship lengths from full speed. They were the first gas turbine ships in the US Navy, as well as the first with aluminum hulls and fiberglass superstructures.

== History ==
Originally designed for the Caribbean patrols, the Asheville class were deployed into Southeast Asia. They proved successful in coastal work, intercepting small boats attempting to transport arms along the Vietnam coast. Attempts to use them on the inland rivers proved disastrous to the small lightly armored ships, USS Canon was severely damaged by over eight rocket strikes, resulting in half of the crew being wounded.

USS Surprise and USS Defiance were deployed in the Mediterranean to counter Soviet gunboats.

Five of the gunboats were fitted with various missile systems replacing the 40 mm guns. Benicia conducted test firings in the spring of 1971 of a modified AGM-12 Bullpup surface-to-surface missile system and Antelope and Ready were fitted with two launch cells aft plus reload boxes on deck. Grand Rapids and Douglas were fitted with an improved AGM-78 Standard ARM missile.

== Ships ==
A total of 17 Asheville-class gunboats were built between 1966 and 1971.

During the Third Cod War between Iceland and Great Britain in 1975–1976 the Icelandic Coast Guard, through the Minister of Justice Ólafur Jóhannesson (the political leader of the Coast Guard), requested the loan of one or more Asheville boats from the United States Navy. With their high speed they were considered ideal for the Icelanders to counter the British frigates protecting fishing trawlers on the Icelandic fishing banks. The U.S. Secretary of State Henry Kissinger categorically turned down the Icelandic request. This hardly came as a great surprise to the Icelanders, as the request for the Asheville boats was probably a political ploy, intended to show how serious Iceland was in overcoming the Royal Navy in the struggle for the fishing banks. The seaworthiness of the Ashevilles in the rough seas of the North Atlantic around Iceland has to be considered doubtful, at best.

=== Original commission ===
The following Asheville-class gunboats were commissioned for the U.S. Navy.

- USS Asheville (PGM-84) commissioned on 6 August 1966. It was struck from the Navy Register on 15 December 1976.
- USS Gallup (PGM-85) commissioned on 22 October 1966. Struck 9 October 1984.
- USS Antelope (PGM-86) commissioned on 4 November 1967. Struck 1 October 1977.
- USS Ready (PGM-87) commissioned on 6 January 1968. Struck on 1 October 1977.
- USS Crockett (PGM-88) commissioned on 24 June 1967. Struck on 15 December 1976.
- USS Marathon (PGM-89) commissioned on 11 May 1968. Struck on 15 December 1976.
- USS Canon (PGM-90) commissioned on 26 July 1968. Struck on 9 October 1984.
- PGM-91 was not an Asheville-class ship.
- USS Tacoma (PGM-92) commissioned on 14 July 1969. Struck on 12 April 1995.
- USS Welch (PGM-93) commissioned on 8 September 1969. Struck on 9 October 1984.
- USS Chehalis (PGM-94) commissioned on 8 November 1969.
- USS Defiance (PGM-95) commissioned on 24 September 1969. Struck on 6 August 1987.
- USS Benicia (PGM-96) commissioned on 25 April 1970. Struck on 30 August 1996.
- USS Surprise (PGM-97) commissioned on 17 October 1969. Struck on 6 August 1987.
- USS Grand Rapids (PGM-98) commissioned on 5 September 1970.
- USS Beacon (PGM-99) commissioned on 22 November 1969. Struck on June 1990. Transferred to Greek Navy (see below).
- USS Douglas (PGM-100) commissioned on 7 February 1971. Struck on 1 October 1977.
- USS Green Bay (PG-101) commissioned on 5 December 1969. Struck on 1 October 1977. Transferred to Greek Navy (see below).

(PG-93, PG-95, PG-97, PG-99 & PG-101 were built by Peterson Builders, Sturgeon Bay, Wisconsin; most of the remaining PG-84 class were built by Tacoma Boatbuilding Company.)

=== Hellenic Navy ===
Two of the ships were transferred to the navy of Greece; both ships were in reserve from April 1977 before being refitted & transferred. The gas-turbine propulsion engines were removed prior to transfer, and the ships were reclassified as coastal patrol craft.

- Tolmi (ΤΟΛΜΗ) (ex-Green Bay) transferred 1989, recommissioned on 18 June 1991.
- Hormi (ΟΡΜΗ) (ex-Beacon) transferred 1989, recommissioned on 18 June 1991.

=== Colombian National Armada ===
- USS Tacoma (PGM-92) officially released to Colombia on 20 September 1995, renamed ARC Quita Sueño (P-111).
- USS Welch (PGM-93) officially released to Colombia on 20 September 1995, renamed ARC Albuquerque (P-112).

=== Turkish Navy ===
- USS Defiance (PGM-95) transferred to Turkey in 1973 under the Foreign Assistance Act; renamed Yildirim (P-338), sunk in 1985.
- USS Surprise (PGM-97) transferred to Turkey in 1973 under the Foreign Assistance Act; renamed Bora (P-339).

=== Republic of Korea Navy ===
- USS Benicia (PGM-96) transferred to Korea in 1973; renamed Paek Ku (PGM 351), scrapped in 1998.

== See also ==
- List of patrol vessels of the United States Navy
