= USS Green Bay (PG-101) =

Gunboat of the United States Navy

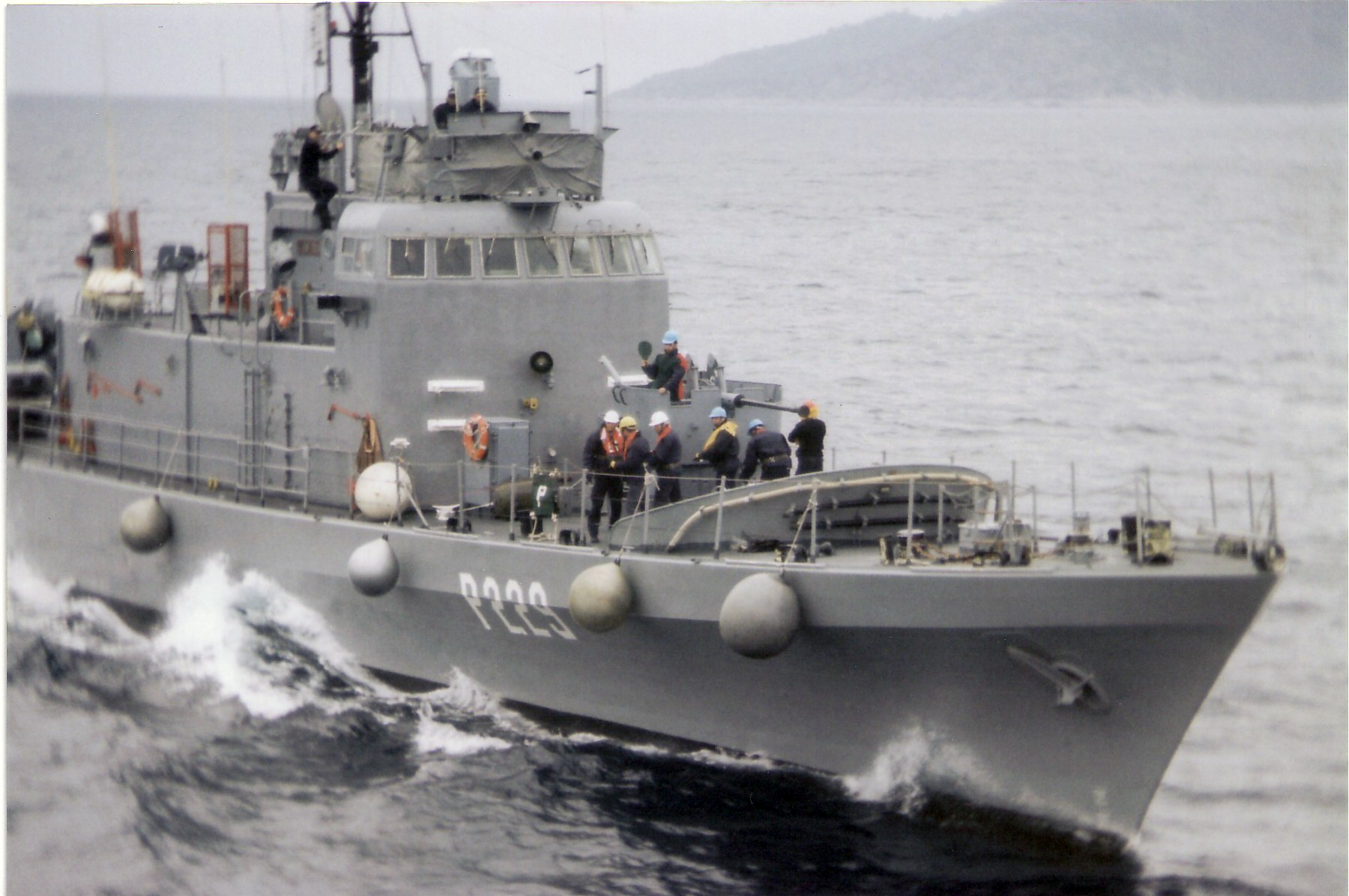
- Green Bay as Tolmi (P229) in 2005

History

United States
- Name: Green Bay
- Namesake: Green Bay, Wisconsin
- Builder: Peterson Builders, Sturgeon Bay, Wisconsin
- Laid down: 6 November 1966
- Launched: 14 June 1969
- Commissioned: 5 December 1969
- Decommissioned: 22 April 1977
- Stricken: 1 October 1977
- Home port: Naval Amphibious Base Little Creek, Virginia
- Identification: PG-101
- Fate: Transferred to the Hellenic Navy, 30 June 1989

Greece
- Name: Tolmi
- Acquired: 30 June 1989
- Recommissioned: 18 June 1991
- Home port: Salamis Naval Base
- Identification: P-229
- Status: Active as of 2021

General characteristics
- Class & type: Asheville-class gunboat
- Displacement: 237 tons; 265 tons
- Length: 164 ft 5 in (50.11 m)
- Beam: 23 ft 8 in (7.21 m)
- Draft: 9 ft 5 in (2.87 m)
- Propulsion: CODOG; 2 × Cummins VT12-875 diesel; 1,450 hp (1.08 MW); General Electric LM1500 marine gas turbine
- Speed: 16 kn (30 km/h) max on diesels; 42 kn (78 km/h) max on turbine
- Range: 1,700 NM (3,100 km)
- Complement: 28 officers and enlisted; 34 officers and enlisted
- Armament: 3 in (76 mm)/50 cal. gun mount; 40 mm (1.6 in) gun mount; 2 × .50 cal. machine guns; 2 × 40 mm (1.6 in) auto cannons; 2 × 20 mm (0.79 in) guns; Stinger anti-aircraft missiles

USS Green Bay (PG-101) was an Asheville-class gunboat in the United States Navy. She has since been transferred to the Hellenic Navy under the name HS Tolmi (P-229).

== United States Navy service ==
Green Bay was laid down on 6 November 1966 as PGM-101 by Peterson Builders in Sturgeon Bay, Wisconsin. While under construction, she was reclassified as Patrol Gunboat, PG-101 on 1 April 1967. She was launched on 14 June 1969 and commissioned as USS Green Bay (PG-101) on 5 December 1969 at the Boston Navy Yard in Charlestown, Massachusetts.

Green Bay was home-ported in Little Creek, Virginia and made numerous trips to Guantanamo Bay, Cuba to serve in the role of the aggressor in fleet exercises. In addition, Green Bay participated in many exercises that simulated the deployment of Navy Seals & US Marines onto hostile shores. On 9 August 1974, Green Bay was nominated, by COMPHIBLANT (Commander Amphibious Forces Atlantic), for the Arleigh Burke Award.

She was decommissioned 22 April 1977 at Naval Amphibious Base Little Creek, Virginia and struck from the Navy Register on 1 October 1977.

== Hellenic Navy service ==
Green Bay was transferred to Greece on 30 June 1989 as the corvette Tolmi (P-229) and was commissioned on 18 June 1991.

Since 2002, Tolmi has been stationed at Salamis Naval Base. Her main duties include patrolling the Aegean Sea.

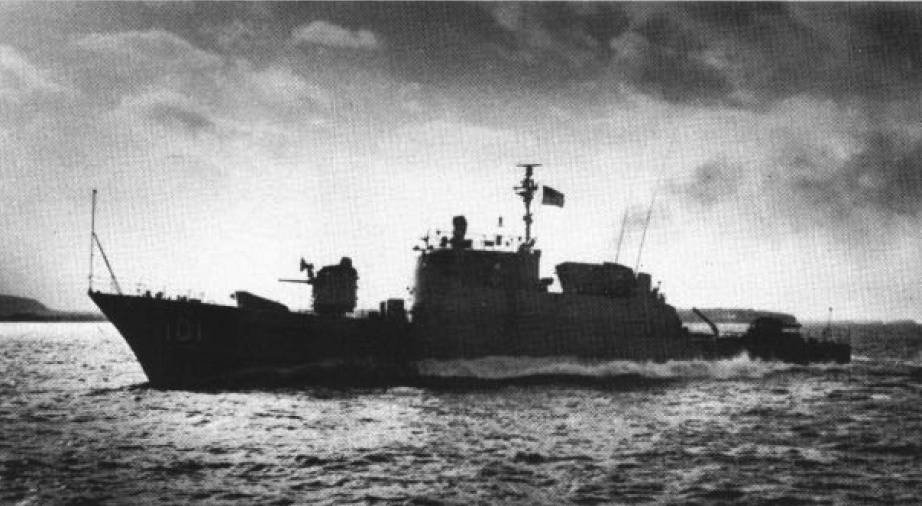
USS Green Bay underway, circa 1970.
