= USS Marathon (PGM-89) =

Gunboat of the United States Navy

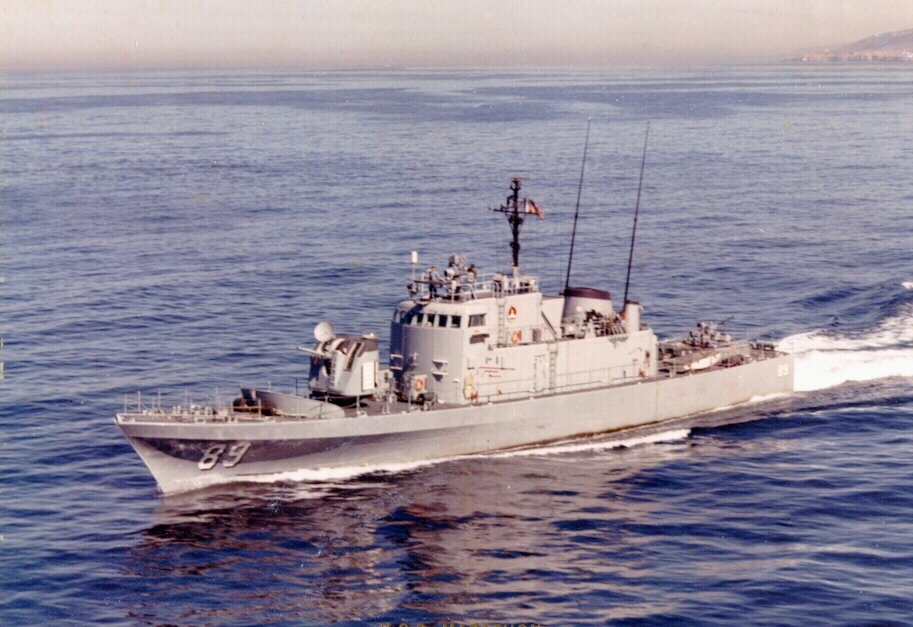

History

United States
- Name: USS Marathon
- Namesake: Marathon County, Wisconsin
- Builder: Tacoma Boatbuilding Company
- Laid down: 21 June 1966
- Launched: 22 April 1967
- Commissioned: 11 May 1968
- Decommissioned: 31 January 1977
- Stricken: 31 January 1977
- Home port: San Diego, California; Guam; Little Creek, Virginia
- Fate: transferred to the Massachusetts Maritime Academy as a training vessel

General characteristics
- Displacement: 240 tons (full load)
- Length: 165 ft (50 m)
- Beam: 24 ft (7.3 m)
- Draft: 9 ft 6 in (2.90 m)
- Propulsion: gas turbine engines
- Speed: 40 knots
- Complement: 28
- Armament: 1 × 3 in (76 mm)/50 caliber gun; 1 × Bofors 40 mm gun mount; 2 × twin .50 caliber machine guns

USS Marathon (PGM-89/PG-89) was an Asheville-class gunboat acquired by the U.S. Navy for the task of high speed patrolling in shallow waterways.

The second ship to be named Marathon by the Navy, PGM-89, a motor gunboat, was laid down 21 June 1966 by Tacoma Boatbuilding Company, Tacoma, Washington; reclassified PG 89 on 28 March 1967; launched 22 April 1967; sponsored by Mrs. Robert W. Copeland; and commissioned 11 May 1968.

== A specially-designed littoral combat ship ==
Designed for shallow water coastal operations, Marathon was built for speed and maneuverability. Constructed almost entirely of aluminum and fiberglass, the ship's light weight and gas turbine engines made the patrol gunboat well suited for counterinsurgency and coastal blockade operations. Given the guerilla tactics in the Vietnam War, as well as the danger to larger ships posed by small missile boats, the Asheville-class patrol gunboats were seen as a relatively cheap "littoral combat ship."

== Vietnam War operations ==
After commissioning, Marathon operated independently in Puget Sound for several weeks prior to proceeding to San Diego, California, for further operations and training. Following shakedown operations and individual type training, Marathon prepared for Operation Market Time coastal surveillance operations off South Vietnam. On 28 August, Rear Admiral Elmo R. Zumwalt, (prospective Commander, Naval Forces, Vietnam), rode the ship during a patrol problem to gain insight into the gunboat's capabilities.

In November, the gunboat entered Long Beach Naval Shipyard for a short post-shakedown availability, a period lengthened by labor and material problems to 5 March 1969. Later that month, Marathon was visited by Secretary of the Navy John H. Chafee. Less than a month later on 15 April, Marathon suffered an engine casualty and more delays as yard workers had trouble welding the gunboats' aluminum deck plates. After repairs were completed in May, the ship finally went to sea for a group exercise in June 1969, where she practiced convoy defense tactics during Exercise "Bell Call." She was also visited by Rear Admiral Dybdal, for a tour and evaluation of PG-type ships for the Ethiopian Navy. The gunboat remained at San Diego, until October when she entered Long Beach Naval Shipyard for her first major overhaul. With repairs and modifications complete in late November, began a long series of evaluations and inspections in preparation for a Vietnam deployment.

=== A new home port in Guam ===
Following a tactical exercise in January 1970, and coastal interdiction training in March, Marathon departed San Diego on 2 June for her new home port at Guam in the Marianas Islands. After a quick refueling stop at Pearl Harbor, the gunboat arrived at Apra Harbor, Guam on 25 June. A week later, Marathon sailed for South Vietnam and, after a refueling stop at Subic Bay, Philippines on 8 July, she began Market Time duties out of Cam Ranh Bay on the 11th.

=== Dangerous river patrols ===
One of Marathon's first tasks was to escort battle damaged USS Canon from the mouth of the Bo De River back to Cam Ranh Bay on 15 July. The rocket-propelled grenade and bullet scars in Canon's hull were sober reminders of the dangers the gunboats faced in littoral waters. After receiving a camouflage paint scheme, Marathon spent the next nine weeks conducted uneventful river operations before conducting a few coastal surveillance patrols in October. Relieved by other patrol gunboats, Marathon, USS Gallup and their base ship USS Park County sailed to Guam, via Subic Bay, arriving there on 18 November.

=== Operation Market Time patrols ===
Following a restricted availability in Guam, Marathon returned to South Vietnam in late April 1971, beginning Market Time patrols on the 27th. This monotonous cruising was interrupted in late June by a port visit to Bangkok, Thailand, 28 June to 1 July, before the gunboat returned to Cam Ranh Bay to resume patrols. Marathon fired her guns only once, shelling An Thoi Island on 6 August with unknown results, before arriving home to Guam on 14 September. Once there, Marathon began her second major overhaul, which finished up on 8 December. In a change of pace, the gunboat conducted a short security patrol of the Caroline Islands in mid-December.

Marathon returned to South Vietnam on 10 March 1972 and operated out of Vung Tau conducting maritime patrols. These operations were again uneventful and the gunboat received a well-deserved week-long visit to Singapore in late July. After a few more weeks on patrol, the gunboat returned home, arriving in Guam on 30 August. She spent the remainder of the year conducting type training and providing submarine torpedo target services.

=== Visiting local areas in the Far East ===
In January 1973, Marathon and Gallup conducted a joint week-long patrol in the Caroline Islands before resuming type training out of Guam. Local operations continued until early March, when the gunboat sailed to Subic Bay for coastal patrol operations in the Philippines. On 30 April, Marathon moved on to Hong Kong for a week-long port visit. After a short return trip to Subic Bay, the gunboat sailed north to Taiwan for a visit and demonstration cruises. Marathon then returned to Guam, arriving there on 5 June to commence another overhaul. With yard work finished in September, the gunboat resumed local operations, including two more patrols in the Caroline Islands.

Underway 13 February 1974, Marathon and other gunboats sailed to the Philippines and conducted a simulated missile boat attack on the USS Midway battle group off Subic Bay on the 19th. Unlike the other two gunboats, Marathon avoided the defensive carrier air assets and successfully "launched" missile attacks against the carrier and one escort. Four days later, the gunboat sortied from Subic Bay for another exercise but a turbine compressor failure took her out of the exercise. Local repairs kept Marathon in port until March, when the gunboat prepared for Exercise Multiplex 1-74, a combined gunboat-aircraft attack exercise on a carrier battle group. While at sea on 18 April, however, Marathon suffered a fuel leak and fire in the turbine spaces that burned into the crew spaces, forcing the ship to shut down her engines. Towed into port the following day, the gunboat was drydocked in AFDL-10 for repairs.

== Return to the States ==
Following post-repair sea trials, Marathon and the other gunboats at Guam returned to the United States, arriving in Chicago, Illinois, on 12 November after a long, circuitous transit via Pearl Harbor, San Diego, the Panama Canal, Norfolk, Virginia, the St. Lawrence Seaway and the Great Lakes. Once there, the gunboats helped train reservists as part of Coastal River Division 21. The gunboats also supported Navy recruiting efforts and made numerous port visits to small ports on Lake Michigan, including Traverse City, Michigan, and Milwaukee, Wisconsin.

In company with USS Asheville and USS Crockett, Marathon got underway on 1 June 1976 for her new home port back in Little Creek, Virginia. The gunboats sailed out through the Great Lakes and the St. Lawrence River, visiting Quebec en route, before arriving in Little Creek via Newport, Rhode Island, on 25 June. Following a series of local operations, and one short visit to New York City, the ship received notification in November of her upcoming inactivation.

== Decommissioning ==
Marathon was decommissioned at Portsmouth, Virginia, on 31 January 1977 and was struck from the navy list that same day. The ship was demilitarized and transferred to the Massachusetts Maritime Academy on 18 April 1977.
