= USS Douglas =

Gunboat of the United States Navy

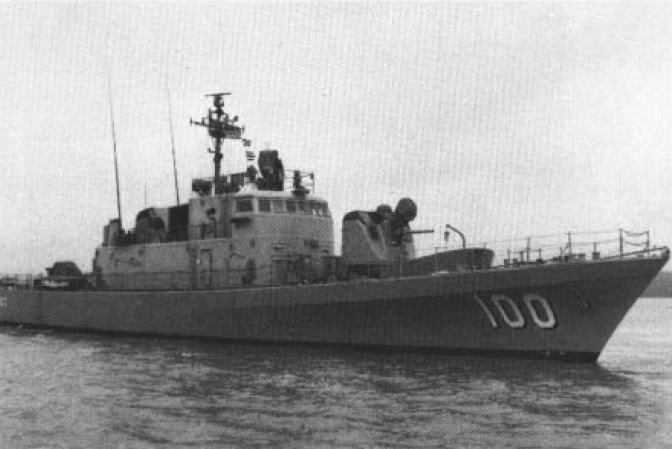
- USS Douglas (PG-100), circa 1974

History

United States
- Name: USS Douglas (PG-100)
- Builder: Tacoma Boatbuilding Company
- Launched: 19 June 1970
- Commissioned: 6 February 1971
- Decommissioned: 1 October 1977
- Fate: Transferred to Naval Sea Systems Command as R/V Lauren; Sunk as target 30 April 2008

General characteristics
- Class & type: Asheville-class gunboat
- Displacement: 245 tons
- Length: 164 ft 6 in
- Beam: 23 ft 11 in
- Draft: 5 ft 4 in
- Speed: 40 kts
- Complement: 24
- Armament: 1 × 3 in (76 mm)/50 caliber gun; 1 × Bofors 40 mm gun mount; 2 × twin .50 caliber machine guns
- Notes: 40 mm gun replaced with two Standard Anti-Radiation Missiles in boxed launchers.

USS Douglas (PG-100) was an Asheville-class gunboat which served in the United States Navy from 1971 to 1977.

Douglas was constructed by Tacoma Boatbuilding Co., of Tacoma, Washington. She was launched on 19 June 1970 and commissioned as USS Douglas (PG-100) on 6 February 1971.

She spent the bulk of her career based in Naples, Italy, as part of a squadron of missile-armed gunboats participating in US and NATO exercises and operations in the Mediterranean. She and the rest of the squadron were decommissioned on 1 October 1977 at Little Creek, Virginia.

She was stricken from the Navy Register on 1 October 1977 and was transferred to the David Taylor Naval Research and Development Center at Annapolis, Maryland. She was then converted to a Research Vessel, renamed R/V Lauren and operated with the Naval Surface Warfare Center Panama City near Panama City, Florida.

Lauren was sunk on a sandbank, off the coast of North Carolina, on 30 April 2008 for use as a target for fighter pilots from Marine Corps Air Station Cherry Point in Havelock, North Carolina.
