= USS Ready (PG-87) =

Gunboat of the United States Navy

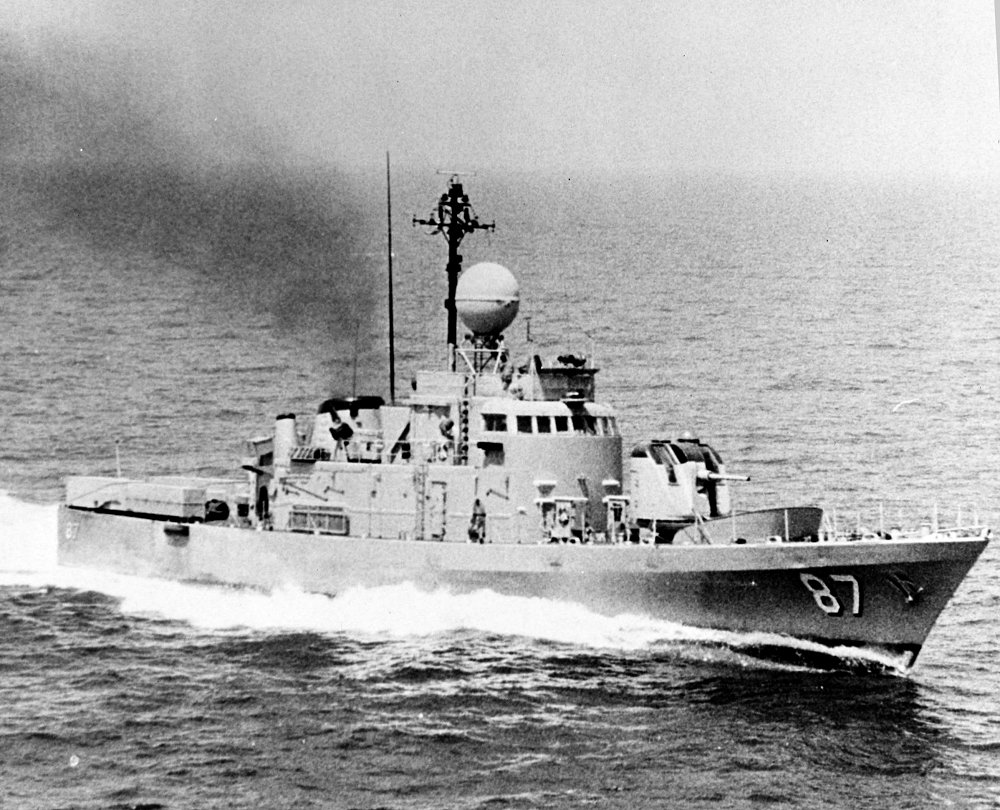

History

United States
- Name: USS Ready (PG-87)
- Builder: Tacoma Boatbuilding Company
- Laid down: 10 June 1965
- Launched: 12 May 1967
- Commissioned: 6 January 1968
- Stricken: 1 October 1977

General characteristics
- Class & type: Asheville-class gunboat
- Displacement: 245 tons
- Length: 164 ft 6 in
- Beam: 23 ft 11 in
- Draft: 5 ft 4 in
- Speed: 40 kts
- Complement: 24
- Armament: 1 × 3 in (76 mm)/50 caliber gun; 1 × Bofors 40 mm gun mount; 2 × twin .50 caliber machine guns

The second USS Ready (PGM-87/PG-87) was a Asheville-class gunboat in the United States Navy during the Vietnam War.

Ready was laid down by the Tacoma Boatbuilding Company, Tacoma, Washington, 10 June 1965; reclassified PG-87 on 1 April 1967; launched 12 May 1967; sponsored by Mrs. William E. Ferrall; and commissioned 6 January 1968, Lt. Paul T. Souval in command.

Ready's speed, maneuverability, and shallow draft enable her to work close into shores in support of counterinsurgency, guerrilla, and conventional amphibious operations. After shakedown in Puget Sound and nearby areas, she sailed 12 March for her homeport, San Diego. She operated out of San Diego until 10 June when she went into the Long Beach Naval Shipyard for availability. She returned to operations out of San Diego 20 November. During 1969 she continued to operate off the southern California coast until steaming for Apra, Guam, where she arrived in November.

She remained at Guam until 19 January 1970, when she embarked for Cam Ranh Bay, Vietnam. Ready was employed in riverine operations around Cam Ranh Bay and Danang until 26 July. At that time, she returned to Guam, via Hong Kong, for extended availability at Apra, arriving 2 August. On 27 January 1971, she steamed into Subic Bay, Philippine Islands, for a month of special operations. Ready returned to Cam Ranh Bay 21 March for a two-month stay, departing the area in May and arriving at Apra, Guam 17 May.

After a 12-day stopover at Apra, she weighed anchor for Pearl Harbor and Long Beach, entering the latter 20 June. Ready spent the next year in and around Long Beach, from whence she sailed 24 July 1972, bound ultimately for Little Creek, Virginia. She arrived at Little Creek in August, after stopping at Acapulco, Mexico, and transiting the Panama Canal. In September 1972, she headed out of the Chesapeake Bay for the Mediterranean Sea.

She arrived in Naples, Italy in September 1972. Ready participated in 6th Fleet exercises as a member of the Orange Forces, simulating a Soviet vessel. She was decommissioned in October 1977.

Ready earned 2 battle stars for Vietnam service.
