= USS Benicia (PG-96) =

Gunboat of the United States Navy

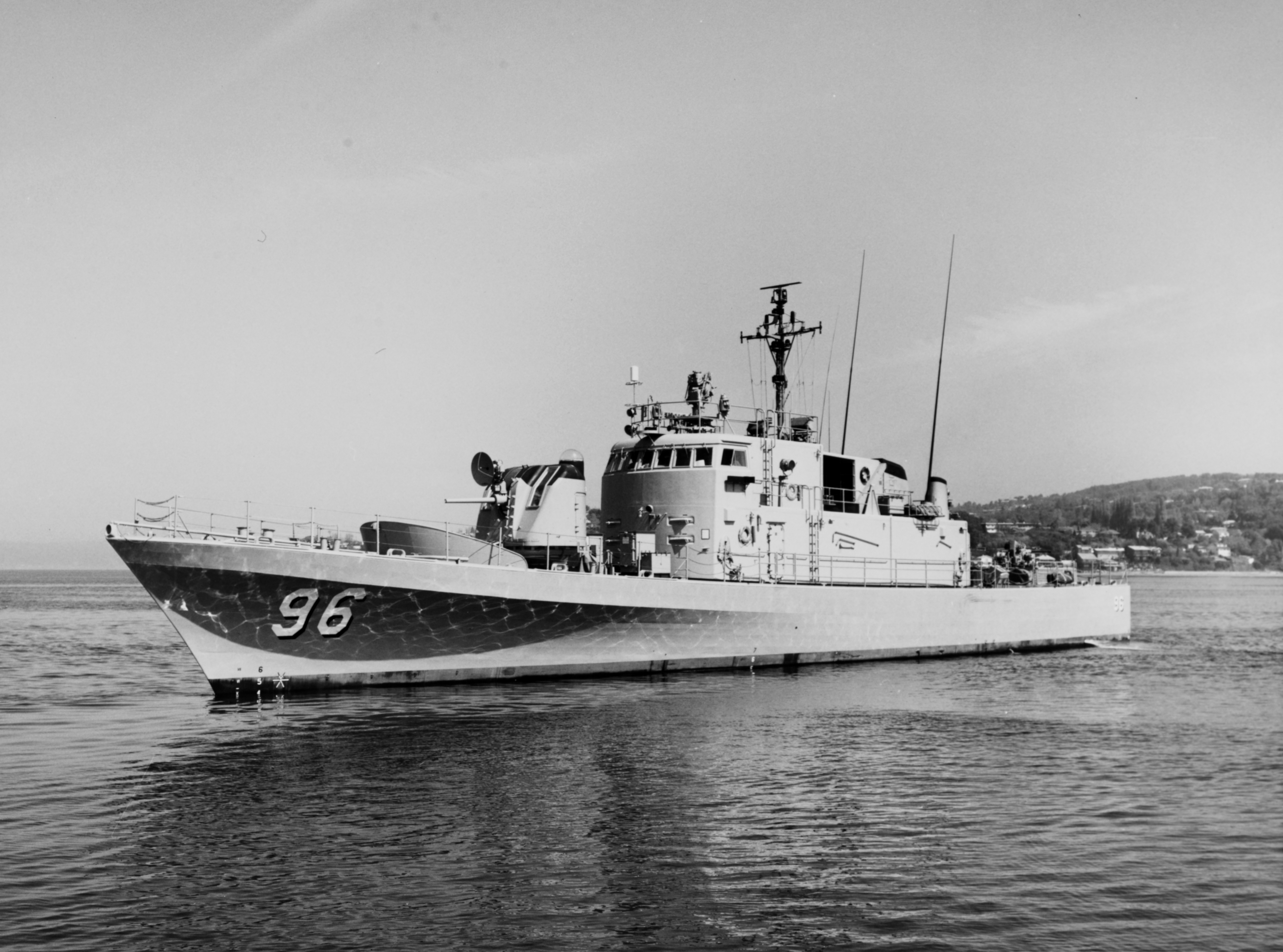
- USS Benicia (PG-96) on 17 April 1970

History

United States
- Name: USS Benicia (PG-96)
- Namesake: Benicia, California
- Builder: Tacoma Boatbuilding Company
- Laid down: 14 April 1969
- Launched: 20 December 1969
- Commissioned: 25 April 1970
- Decommissioned: 15 October 1971
- Stricken: 30 August 1996
- Fate: Scrapped

General characteristics
- Class & type: Asheville-class gunboat
- Displacement: 240 tons (244 t)
- Length: 164 ft 6 in (50.14 m)
- Beam: 24 ft (7.3 m)
- Draft: 9 ft 6 in (2.90 m)
- Propulsion: 2 × Cummins VT12-875 diesel; 1,450 hp (1.07 MW); General Electric LM1500 marine gas turbine
- Speed: 16 knots (30 km/h) maximum on diesels; 42 knots (78 km/h) maximum on turbine
- Range: 1,700 NM (3100 km)
- Complement: 24 crew (4 officers)
- Sensors & processing systems: Weapons control: Mk 63 GFCS. Radar: Sperry AN/SPS-53; I/J-band. Fire control: Western Electric AN/SPG-50; I/J-band.
- Armament: Guns: 1 × USN 3 in (76 mm) /50 Mk 34; 50 rounds/min to (7 NM) 12.8 km; weight of shell 6 kg.; 4 × .50 cal (12.7 mm) machine guns (2 × 2); 1 × Bofors 40 mm/70 Mk 10.

The second USS Benicia (PGM-96/PG-96) was an Asheville-class gunboat in the United States Navy commissioned in 1970. She later served in the South Korean Navy as Paek Ku 51 (PGM-351).

== Operational history ==
=== United States Navy (1970–1971) ===
Benicia was laid down on 14 April 1969 at Tacoma, Washington, by the Tacoma Boatbuilding Company after a fire in August 1968 destroyed the incomplete hull laid down on 3 January 1967; launched on 20 December 1969; sponsored by Mrs. William F. Petrovic; and commissioned at Tacoma on 25 April 1970.

After fitting out at Tacoma, Benicia made her first port of call in her namesake city of Benicia, California. She then cruised south, arriving at her home port of San Diego in early May. Designed for offshore patrol and the control of coastal maritime traffic, the patrol gunboat was equipped with a combination diesel and gas turbine (CODOG) engine system. Ordinarily, she would cruise normally on her diesels but, in an emergency, the gas turbine engine provided extremely high bursts of speed, allowing Benicia to maneuver quickly and radically in confined, coastal waters.

Assigned to Coastal Squadron (CosRon) 3, the gunboat's crew conducted type training exercises and shakedown procedures in Benicia that summer. Operating in the waters off San Diego, the crew conducted turbine evaluations, tested the gunboat's variable-pitch propellers, and familiarized themselves with her communication and navigation systems. After completing her final contract trials in September, Benicia began a post-shakedown availability at the Long Beach Naval Shipyard in mid-October. During this seven-week repair period, the gunboat was assigned to the administrative command of Coastal Division (CosDiv) 32 at San Diego. Following the availability, Benicia spent the rest of the year in port at San Diego.

Starting on 28 January 1971, Benicia began evaluation of a special surface-to-surface guided-missile system designed for gunboats. Part of a larger study intended to develop anti-missile boat warfare doctrine, this system was designed to increase gunboat firepower and counter the anti-ship missile threat from Soviet-made fast attack boats. Equipped with a single Standard ARM missile launcher on the fantail, Benicia conducted fire control and operational tests in preparation for a live-fire exercise. On 6 March, she became the first American gunboat to successfully fire a guided missile.

With the missile study complete on the 12th, the gunboat began another series of experiments. Called the "Seakindliness and Performance Trials," these were designed to test the endurance sea-keeping ability of gunboats in heavy seas. If the gunboats could operate in the open ocean, they could better protect convoys, conduct surveillance missions, and support conventional amphibious warfare operations. Following these successful exercises, Benicia spent the rest of the summer participating in fleet and amphibious training exercises. These included convoy attack and screening tactics, inshore patrol, and a large-scale, joint Army-Navy special forces exercise.

=== South Korean Navy (1971–1991) ===
On 15 August, the gunboat's crew received orders informing them that Benicia was to be leased to the Republic of Korea. The South Korean crew arrived in San Diego in mid-September and several weeks of pre-transfer training took place in that port. Benicia was decommissioned on 15 October 1971, and she was transferred to the South Korean Navy that same day. She served as Paek Ku 51 (PGM-351) until decommissioned and returned to United States Navy in 1991. Benicia's name was struck from the Naval Vessel Register on 30 August 1996, and she was scrapped in Korea in 1998.
