= USS Chehalis (PGM-94) =

Gunboat of the United States Navy

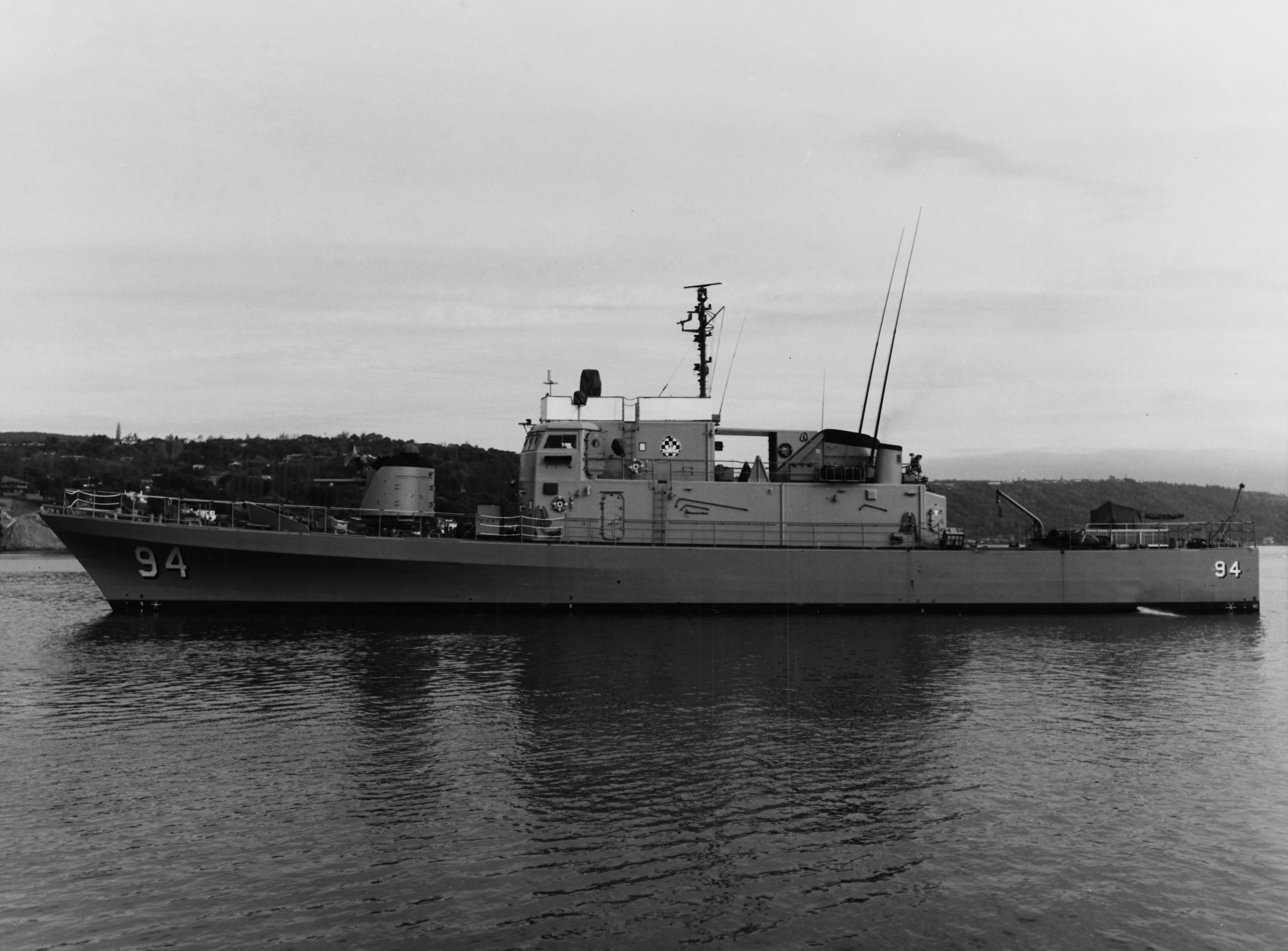
- USS Chehalis off Tacoma, Washington on 3 November 1969

History

United States
- Name: USS Chehalis
- Namesake: Chehalis, Washington
- Builder: Tacoma Boatbuilding Company, Tacoma, Washington
- Launched: 8 June 1968
- Commissioned: 8 November 1969
- Decommissioned: 1 October 1977
- Home port: Panama City, Florida Panama City, Florida (as R/V Athena)
- Fate: Transferred to Naval Sea Systems Command, renamed R/V Athena; Scrapped in 2016

General characteristics
- Displacement: 247 long tons (251 t) (full load)
- Length: 165 ft (50 m)
- Beam: 24 ft (7.3 m)
- Draft: 5 ft (1.5 m)
- Propulsion: CODOG (Combined diesel or gas turbine engines
- Speed: 37.5 knots
- Complement: 24
- Armament: 1 × 3 in (76 mm)/50 caliber gun; 1 × Bofors 40 mm gun mount; 4 × .50 caliber machine guns

USS Chehalis (PGM-94/PG-94) was an Asheville-class gunboat of the U.S. Navy and the second ship to be named Chehalis. Chehalis was launched 8 June 1968 at the Tacoma Boatbuilding Company. She was commissioned 8 November 1969. The vessel was named in honor of Chehalis, a city in Washington state. Later, she was transferred to Naval Sea Systems Command and renamed Research Vessel Athena. Athena was scrapped in 2016. As of 2026, the ship sits on the Tensaw River in Stockton, Alabama.

The Chehalis was powered by a combination of two Cummins diesel engines and a General Electric LM-1500 gas turbine. Pneumatic actuators allowed the power source to be switched between the two sources.
