= USS Gallup (PGM-85) =

Asheville-class gunboat

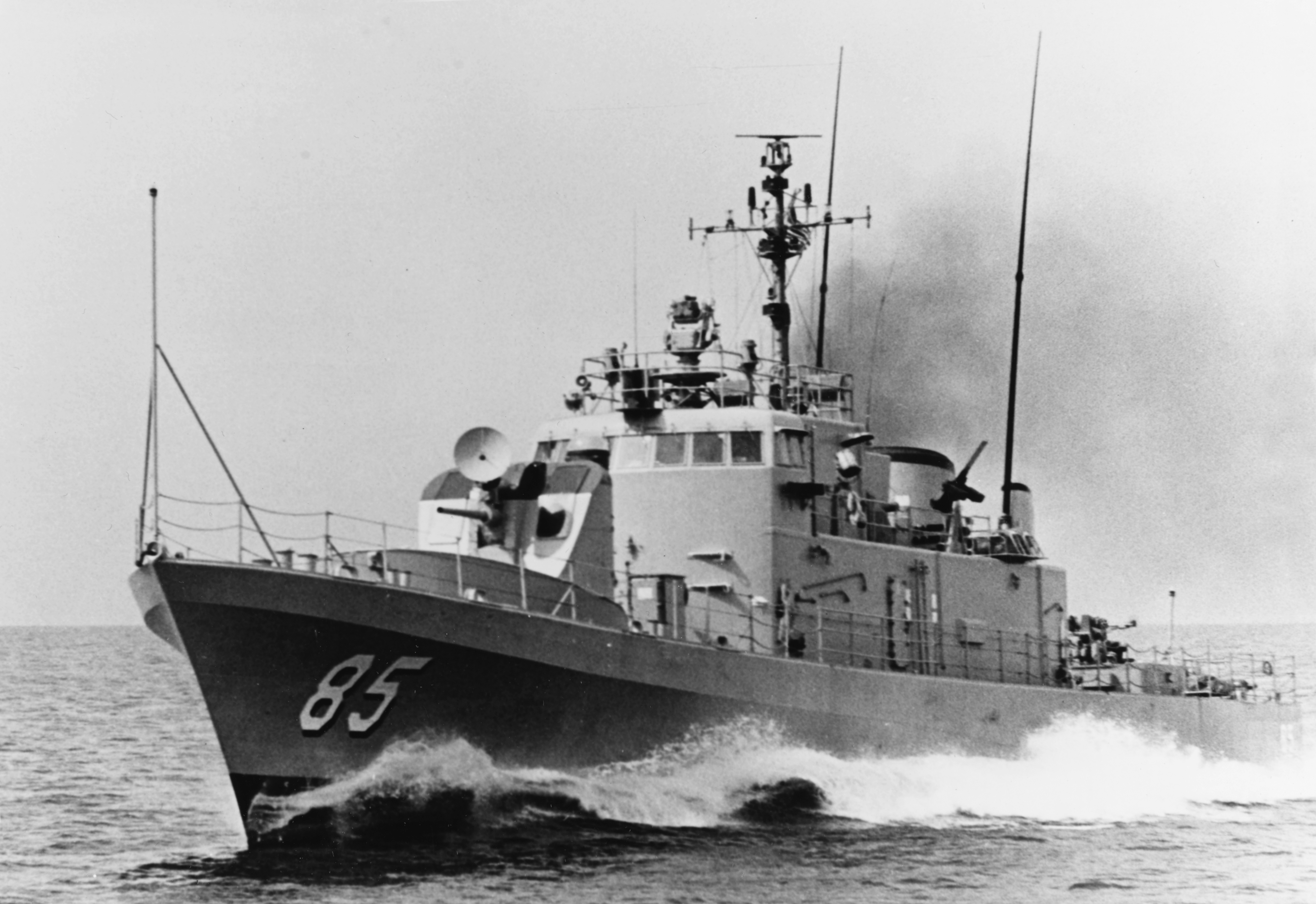

History

United States
- Name: USS Gallup
- Namesake: Gallup, New Mexico
- Builder: Tacoma Boatbuilding Company
- Laid down: 27 April 1964
- Launched: 15 June 1965
- Acquired: 21 October 1966
- Commissioned: 22 October 1966
- Decommissioned: 31 January 1977
- Stricken: 9 October 1984
- Motto: Have Guns Will Travel
- Fate: Scrapped, 2007

General characteristics
- Displacement: 240 tons (full load)
- Length: 165 ft (50 m)
- Beam: 24 ft (7.3 m)
- Draught: 9 ft 6 in (2.90 m)
- Propulsion: gas turbine engines
- Speed: 40 knots
- Complement: 28
- Armament: 1 × 3 in (76 mm)/50 caliber gun; 1 × Bofors 40 mm gun mount; 2 × twin .50 caliber machine guns

USS Gallup (PGM-85/PG-85) was an Asheville-class gunboat acquired by the United States Navy for the task of high speed patrolling in shallow waterways.

The third U.S. Navy ship to be named Gallup and the second to be named for Gallup, New Mexico, was laid down 27 April 1964 by Tacoma Boatbuilding Company, Inc., Tacoma, Washington; launched 15 June 1965; sponsored by Mrs. Goodwin Chase; and commissioned 22 October 1966.

== Pacific Ocean operations ==
From October 1966 until February 1967, the motor gunboat conducted shakedown operations under Commander Amphibious Group 3 off the U.S. West Coast as far north as Juan de Fuca. On 28 March 1967 Gallup was reclassified PG-85. She served as a patrol and surveillance craft in the U.S. Pacific Fleet.

== Vietnam War operations ==
Gallup served in Vietnam while the war continued. Afterwards, she patrolled the Trust Territories of the Pacific.

== Decommissioning ==
Gallup was decommissioned 31 January 1977 and struck from the Navy Directory on 9 October 1984. She was eventually scrapped in 2007.
