= General Electric LM1500 =

Turboshaft engine first run in 1959

LM1500
- Type: Gas turbine
- National origin: United States
- Manufacturer: General Electric
- Developed from: General Electric J79

The General Electric LM1500 is an industrial and marine gas turbine produced by GE Aviation. The LM1500 is a derivative of the General Electric J79 aircraft engine series.

The LM1500 delivers up to 15,000 shaft horsepower (11,000 kW).

== History ==
The LM1500 was derived from the J79 engine in 1960. Its first application was for the first US sea-going research hydrofoil, HS Denison. Conversion as a marinised turboshaft engine involved two major changes: the addition of a free power turbine, and corrosion-protection by the addition of internal coatings and a maintenance scheme of freshwater rinsing to prevent salt damage. Naval fuels could also include diesel fuels with higher sulphur content than aviation-grade JP-5 fuel, but this was avoided in these early engines by keeping to JP fuels.

Its first commercial use was as a catapult for launching aircraft. Over time, its commercial applications widened to include marine propulsion and its use at oil and gas pipeline compressor stations.
