= USS Asheville (PGM-84) =

Gunboat of the United States Navy

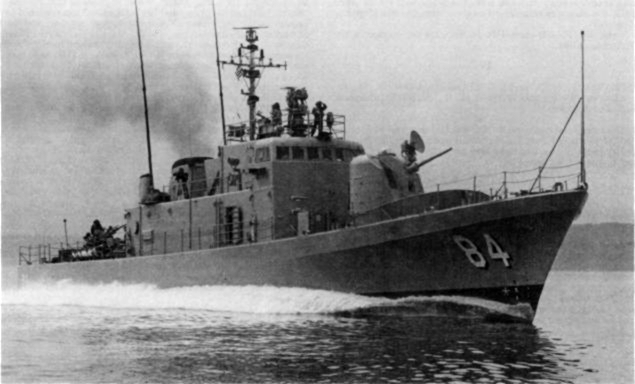

History

United States
- Name: USS Asheville
- Namesake: Asheville, North Carolina
- Builder: Tacoma Boatbuilding Company
- Laid down: 15 April 1964
- Launched: 1 May 1965
- Commissioned: 6 August 1966
- Decommissioned: 31 January 1977
- Stricken: 11 April 1977
- Home port: San Diego, California; Guam
- Fate: Scrapped at Brownsville, Texas, 1985

General characteristics
- Class & type: Asheville-class gunboat
- Displacement: 240 tons (full load)
- Length: 165 ft (50 m)
- Beam: 24 ft (7.3 m)
- Draught: 9 ft 6 in (2.90 m)
- Propulsion: Gas turbine engines
- Speed: 40 knots (74 km/h; 46 mph)
- Complement: 28
- Armament: 1 × 3 in (76 mm)/50 caliber gun; 1 × Bofors 40 mm gun mount; 2 × twin .50 caliber machine guns

USS Asheville (PGM-84/PG-84) was an Asheville-class gunboat acquired by the U.S. Navy for the task of high speed patrolling in shallow waterways. The third ship to be named Asheville by the Navy, the vessel was laid down on 15 April 1964 at Tacoma, Washington, by the Tacoma Boatbuilding Company and launched on 1 May 1965, sponsored by Mrs. R. E. Harris. Asheville was commissioned on 6 August 1966.

== Design and description ==
Asheville, initially designated PGM-84, employed a combined diesel or gas turbine (CODOG) propulsion system; twin Cummins diesel engines for endurance, and a GE LM1500 gas turbine for high-speed dash.

== Service history ==
=== Assigned to the West Coast ===
Asheville completed fitting out at Tacoma on 17 September and got underway for her home port, San Diego, California. She arrived there on 22 September and began shakedown training along the California coast. Shakedown and operational tests lasted until 18 January 1967 at which time she entered the Long Beach Naval Shipyard for post-shakedown availability. Those repairs continued until 14 March at which time she returned to San Diego. The gunboat remained in port there for two weeks. On 28 March, she departed San Diego en route to the western Pacific Ocean. On 1 April, the gunboat was redesignated PG-84. After stops at Pearl Harbor, Hawaii, and Guam and a return visit to the latter island necessitated by a breakdown in her main propulsion plant, Asheville finally arrived at Cam Ranh Bay in South Vietnam on 7 May.

=== Vietnam operations ===
Upon her arrival, she began an extended deployment to the western Pacific Ocean lasting just over eight years, a tour of duty marred by chronic material casualties and frequent repair periods. During the first six years of the deployment, the gunboat served with the Coastal Surveillance Force in South Vietnam when not undergoing repairs at such places as Subic Bay, Guam, Cam Ranh Bay, or Vung Tau. During her line periods, she conducted blockade missions—codenamed Operation Market Time along the South Vietnamese coast in an attempt to interdict the waterborne flow of arms and supplies from North Vietnam to the communist forces operating in South Vietnam. As a secondary mission, the ship provided gunfire support for American and South Vietnamese forces operating ashore.

Late in 1970, Asheville broke her routine of Market Time operations punctuated by frequent repair periods when, after completing an overhaul and restricted availability at Guam, she operated for two months—from late November 1970 to late January 1971—in the Mariana Islands. On 20 January 1971, the ship departed Guam to resume duty in Vietnamese waters. Once again, she conducted coastal surveillance and gunfire support missions—though still plagued by chronic material casualties which frequently took her off the line for repairs. On 18 May, the ship returned to Guam for almost two months of repairs.

When she completed that work on 9 July, Asheville embarked upon seven weeks of patrols and port visits in the Trust Territories of the Pacific. She concluded that assignment at Guam on 1 September and then conducted refresher training out of Apra Harbor for the next two months.

Asheville departed Guam on 5 November and, after a 16-day stop at Subic Bay, returned to Vung Tau. Her duty in South Vietnam lasted until late March 1972 when she headed via Subic Bay back to Guam. The warship arrived at Apra Harbor on 31 May and remained in the Marianas until 13 November. After a stop at Subic Bay on 21 November, she briefly returned to Vietnamese waters before heading for Bangkok, Thailand, where she remained well into the second week in December. On 12 December, she departed Bangkok and, after the usual call at Subic Bay, reentered Apra Harbor on 27 December.

While she was there, the end of American involvement in the Vietnam War halted her combat activities. For the next 17 months, Asheville continued to operate in the central and western Pacific. In November and December 1973, she interrupted her schedule of operations for a cruise to the southern Pacific during which she visited Surabaya, Indonesia, and the Australian ports Cairns, Darwin, and Gove as well as Rabaul on New Britain and Manus in the Admiralty Islands. She returned to Guam on 17 December 1973 and resumed operations from that port.

=== Training ship service and decommissioning ===
On 21 June 1974, the gunboat stood out of Apra Harbor bound ultimately for the United States. She stopped at Oahu from 4 to 6 July and arrived at San Diego, California, on 16 July. On 1 August, she began the long voyage to duty with the U.S. Naval Reserve in Chicago, Illinois. She took almost three months to reach her destination and stopped at a long list of ports along the way. Finally, however, Asheville arrived in Chicago on 28 October 1974. The gunboat spent the remainder of her active career operating on the Great Lakes out of Chicago as a training platform for Naval Reserve personnel of the Chicago area.

She continued that duty until placed out of commission on 31 January 1977, and her name was simultaneously stricken from the Navy list. On 11 April 1977, the ship was transferred to the Massachusetts Maritime Academy. Asheville was broken up at Brownsville, Texas in 1985.

== Military awards and honors ==
- National Defense Service Medal
- Vietnam Service Medal with 14 battle stars
- Republic of Vietnam Campaign Medal
