= Peterson Builders =

Defunct American boat constructor

- Type: Privately held company
- Industry: marine construction
- Founded: 1933
- Defunct: 1996
- Headquarters: Sturgeon Bay, Wisconsin

Peterson Builders Incorporated (PBI) was an American ship building company that constructed small to medium, naval and commercial ships and boats. The company mainly operated from a shipyard in Sturgeon Bay, Wisconsin. Spare parts and logistics were managed from Virginia Beach, Virginia and a ship repair operation in Ingleside, Texas made up part of PBI.

== Products ==
The company built submarine chasers, minesweepers, training craft, harbor security boats, patrol boats, landing crafts, tugboats, diving tenders, personnel boats, torpedo retrievers, salvage ships and sailboats. PBI built ships for the navies of the United States, the Netherlands, Burma, Iran, Ethiopia, Korea, Vietnam, Ecuador, Saudi Arabia, Philippines, the Dominican Republic, Thailand, Peru, Turkey, Greece and Liberia as well as the United States Army and National Science Foundation. The company was one of the United States Navy's prime contractors. They also constructed ferries and fireboats for local and state governments. In 1974, PBI produced a unique floating aquarium for the New England Aquarium. PBI built a crane barge for the Army Corps of Engineers in 1995.

Peterson Builders laid the keel for the schooner Denis Sullivan, a replica 19th century Great Lakes schooner that served as the flagship of Wisconsin from 2000 to 2022.

During the company's 65 years, the company delivered nearly 300 vessels that started with a fishing vessel. PBI was best known for the minesweepers constructed mostly during the 1950s and 1960s and in the late 1980s. While Peterson focused mainly on smaller vessels, they constructed several 300 feet (91 m) long roll-on/roll-off ships for the American Heavy Lift Shipping Company and salvage ships for the US Navy exceeding 220 feet (67 m).

== End of business ==
On June 16, 1995, second generation owner and CEO Ellsworth Peterson, announced that the company was for sale. On September 25, 1995, Larry Maples announced his intention to purchase and operate the company under the name Poseidon Shipbuilding LLC. By November, however, Maple was reported unable to secure the necessary financing. PBI closed down in January 1996. All that remains of the Sturgeon Bay shipyard is a historical marker in what is now Graham Park. A girl's little league baseball field at Graham Park is named after the company (PBI Field).

== See also ==
- Category:Ships built by Peterson Builders
