= Douglas H. Ginsburg =

American federal judge (born 1946)

Douglas Ginsburg
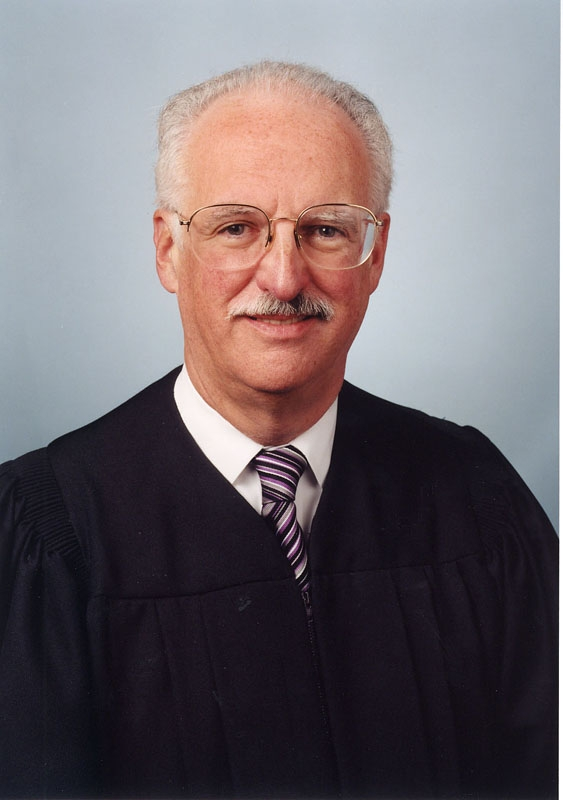
- Official portrait, 2005

Senior Judge of the United States Court of Appeals for the District of Columbia Circuit
- Incumbent
- Assumed office October 14, 2011

Chief Judge of the United States Court of Appeals for the District of Columbia Circuit
- In office July 16, 2001 – February 11, 2008
- Preceded by: Harry T. Edwards
- Succeeded by: David B. Sentelle

Judge of the United States Court of Appeals for the District of Columbia Circuit
- In office October 14, 1986 – October 14, 2011
- Appointed by: Ronald Reagan
- Preceded by: J. Skelly Wright
- Succeeded by: Cornelia Pillard

United States Assistant Attorney General for the Antitrust Division
- In office 1985–1986
- Preceded by: Paul McGrath
- Succeeded by: Charles F. "Rick" Rule

Administrator of the Office of Information and Regulatory Affairs
- In office 1984–1985
- President: Ronald Reagan
- Preceded by: Christopher DeMuth
- Succeeded by: Wendy Lee Gramm

Personal details
- Born: Douglas Howard Ginsburg; May 25, 1946 (age 80) Chicago, Illinois, U.S.
- Education: Cornell University (BS); University of Chicago (JD)

Douglas Howard Ginsburg (born May 25, 1946) is an American lawyer and jurist serving as a senior U.S. circuit judge of the United States Court of Appeals for the District of Columbia Circuit. Appointed in 1986 by President Ronald Reagan, he is also a professor of law at the Antonin Scalia Law School of George Mason University.

Born in Chicago, Ginsburg graduated from Cornell University and the University of Chicago Law School and was a law clerk to Justice Thurgood Marshall of the U.S. Supreme Court. He went on to a career in academia and government, becoming a professor at Harvard Law School and serving in the Reagan administration as Administrator of the Office of Information and Regulatory Affairs and later as Assistant Attorney General for the Antitrust Division of the U.S. Department of Justice.

In 1987, Reagan announced his intention to nominate Ginsburg as an associate justice of the Supreme Court. Ginsburg withdrew his name from consideration two weeks later in the wake of news reports that he had smoked marijuana in the past. Reagan instead nominated Anthony Kennedy.

Ginsburg served as chief judge of the D.C. Circuit from 2001 to 2008. He took senior status in October 2011 and joined the faculty of New York University School of Law in January 2012. In 2013, he left NYU and began teaching at George Mason University. He is the author of scholarly works on U.S. antitrust law and constitutional law.

== Early life and education ==
Ginsburg was born on May 25, 1946, in Chicago, Illinois, to Katherine (née Goodmont) and Maurice Ginsburg. After graduating from the Latin School of Chicago in 1963, he entered Cornell University as a classics major. He dropped out in 1965 due to "boredom" and co-founded Operation Match, an early computer dating service based in Boston, Massachusetts. Ginsburg sold the company in 1968 and returned to Cornell, graduating in 1970 with a Bachelor of Science degree in industrial relations.

Ginsburg then attended the University of Chicago Law School, where he was an editor of the University of Chicago Law Review along with future federal judge Frank Easterbrook and future billionaire investor David Rubenstein. He graduated in 1973 with a J.D. degree and membership in the Order of the Coif.

== Career ==
After law school, Ginsburg was a law clerk to Judge Carl E. McGowan of the D.C. Circuit from 1973 to 1974 and to U.S. Supreme Court justice Thurgood Marshall from 1974 to 1975. He then became a professor at Harvard Law School, where he taught labor law, administrative law, antitrust law, and other subjects.

In 1983, Ginsburg joined the administration of President Ronald Reagan as a deputy assistant attorney general in the U.S. Department of Justice's Antitrust Division. In 1984, he became the administrator of the Executive Office of the President's Office of Information and Regulatory Affairs, and in 1985 he was appointed Assistant Attorney General of the Antitrust Division.

From 1988 to 2008, Ginsburg was an adjunct professor at the George Mason University School of Law (now Antonin Scalia Law School), where he taught a seminar called "Readings in Legal Thought". Until 2011 he was also a Visiting Lecturer and Charles J. Merriam Scholar at the University of Chicago Law School. Ginsburg has been a visiting professor at Columbia University Law School (1987–1988) and a visiting scholar at New York Law School (2006–2008).

Ginsburg is currently a professor at the Antonin Scalia Law School. He was previously a visiting professor at University College London Faculty of Laws. He serves on the advisory boards of the Global Antitrust Institute (Chairman), the Jevons Institute for Competition Law and Economics and the Centre for Law, Economics, and Society, both at University College London, Faculty of Laws. His academic articles and writing has appeared in Competition Policy International, the Journal of Competition Law & Economics; the Journal of Law, Economics & Policy; the Supreme Court Economic Review; the University of Chicago Law Review; and the Harvard Journal of Law & Public Policy.

== Federal judicial service ==
Ginsburg was nominated by President Ronald Reagan on September 23, 1986, to a seat on the District of Columbia Circuit vacated by Judge J. Skelly Wright. He was confirmed by the United States Senate on October 8, 1986, and received his commission on October 14, 1986. He served as Chief Judge of the D.C. Circuit from 2001 to 2008, and he assumed senior status on October 14, 2011.

He was a member of the Judicial Conference of the United States, 2001–2008, and previously served on its Budget Committee, 1997–2001, and Committee on Judicial Resources, 1987–1996; American Bar Association, Antitrust Section, Council, 1985–1986 (ex officio), 2000–2003 and 2009–2012 (judicial liaison); Boston University Law School, Visiting Committee, 1994–1997; and University of Chicago Law School, Visiting Committee, 1985–1988.

== United States Supreme Court nomination ==
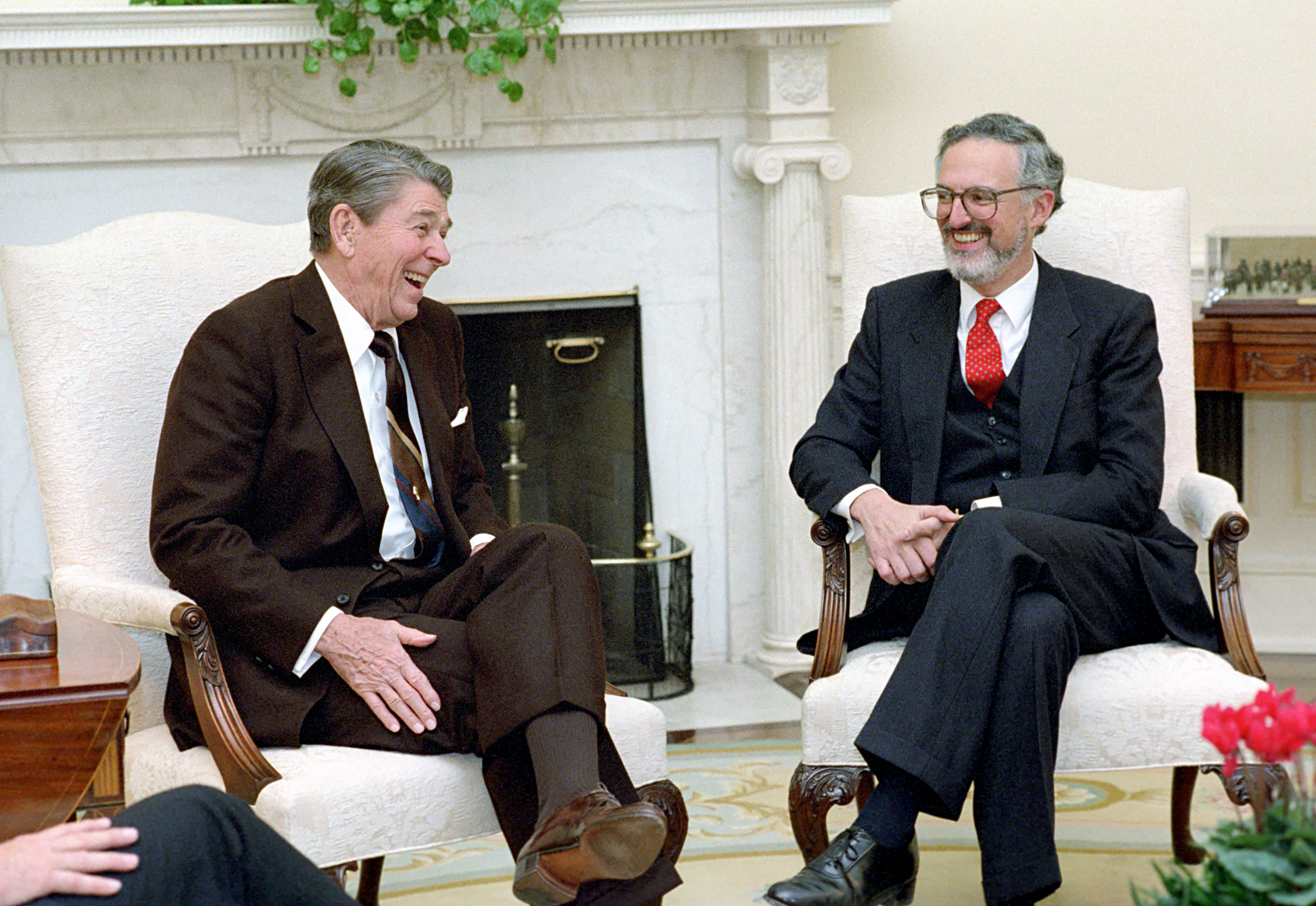
Ginsburg with President Ronald Reagan in 1987

On October 29, 1987, President Reagan announced his intention to nominate Ginsburg to the U.S. Supreme Court to fill the vacancy created by the retirement of Lewis Powell, which had been announced on June 26. Ginsburg was chosen after the United States Senate, controlled by Democrats, had voted down the nomination of Judge Robert Bork after a highly controversial nomination battle which ended with a 42–58 rejection vote on October 23.

Ginsburg's nomination collapsed for entirely different reasons from Bork's rejection, as he almost immediately came under some fire when NPR's Nina Totenberg revealed that Ginsburg had used marijuana "on a few occasions" during his student days in the 1960s and while an assistant professor at Harvard in the 1970s. It was Ginsburg's continued use of marijuana after graduation and as a professor that made his actions more serious in the minds of many senators and members of the public. Ginsburg was also accused of a financial conflict of interest during his work in the Reagan Administration, but a Department of Justice investigation under the Ethics in Government Act determined the allegation was baseless.

Due to the allegations, Ginsburg withdrew his name from consideration on November 7, and remained on the Court of Appeals, serving as chief judge for most of the 2000s. Anthony Kennedy was then nominated on November 11 and confirmed in early February 1988 as an associate justice of the Supreme Court.

== Personal life ==
Ginsburg married the public relations consultant Deecy Gray in 2007 in a ceremony at the U.S. Supreme Court performed by Chief Justice John Roberts. He has three daughters from two previous marriages. Ginsburg is unrelated to the late Supreme Court Justice Ruth Bader Ginsburg.

== Selected scholarly works ==
- Ginsburg, Douglas H. (1981). "Interstate Banking". Hofstra Law Review. 9 (4): 1133–1371.
- —; DeMuth, Christopher C. (1986). "White House Review of Agency Rulemaking". Harvard Law Review. 99 (5): 1075–88. JSTOR 1341244.
- —; Falk, Donald (1990). "The Court En Banc: 1981–1990". The George Washington Law Review. 59 (5): 1008–91.
- — (1991). "Vertical Restraints: De Facto Legality under the Rule of Reason". Antitrust Law Journal. 60 (1): 67–82. JSTOR 40799286.
- —; Shechtman, Paul (1993). "Blackmail: An Economic Analysis of the Law". University of Pennsylvania Law Review. 141 (5): 1849–76. JSTOR 3312576. Archived from the original on October 8, 2014.
- —; Menashi, Steven (2009). "Nondelegation and the Unitary Executive". University of Pennsylvania Journal of Constitutional Law. 12 (2): 251–76. Archived from the original on October 7, 2014.
- — (2010). "Originalism and Economic Analysis: Two Case Studies of Consistency and Coherence in Supreme Court Decision Making" (PDF). Harvard Journal of Law & Public Policy. 33 (1): 217–38.
- —; Wright, Joshua D. (2012). "Behavioral Law and Economics: Its Origins, Fatal Flaws, and Implications for Liberty". Northwestern University Law Review. 106 (3): 1033–88.
- —; Wright, Joshua D. (2013). "The Goals of Antitrust: Welfare Trumps Choice". Fordham Law Review. 81 (5): 2405–24.
- —; Wright, Joshua D. (2015). "Philadelphia National Bank: Bad Economics, Bad Law, Good Riddance". Antitrust Law Journal. 80 (2): 377–96. JSTOR 26411541.
- —; Padilla, Jorge; Wong-Ervin, Koren W. (2019). "Antitrust Analysis Involving Intellectual Property and Standards: Implications from Economics" (PDF). Harvard Journal of Law & Technology. 33 (1): 1–64.
- —; Wright, Joshua D. (2024). "Reimagining Antitrust Institutions: A (Modest?) Proposal". Review of Law & Economics. 20 (1): 83–155. doi:10.1515/rle-2023-0090.

== See also ==
- List of Jewish American jurists
- List of law clerks for the tenth seat of the Supreme Court of the United States

Political offices
Preceded by Christopher DeMuth	Administrator of the Office of Information and Regulatory Affairs; 1984–1985	Succeeded by Wendy Lee Gramm
Legal offices
Preceded by Paul McGrath	United States Assistant Attorney General for the Antitrust Division; 1985–1986	Succeeded by Charles Rule
Preceded by J. Skelly Wright	Judge of the United States Court of Appeals for the District of Columbia Circuit; 1986–2011	Succeeded by Cornelia Pillard
Preceded by Harry T. Edwards	Chief Judge of the United States Court of Appeals for the District of Columbia Circuit; 2001–2008	Succeeded by David B. Sentelle
