= George Mason University Civil Rights Law Journal =

- Discipline: Civil rights
- Language: English
- Edited by: Taylor Lane Daymude

Publication details
- History: 1990–present
- Publisher: William S. Hein & Co. (United States)
- Frequency: Triannually

Standard abbreviations
- Bluebook: Geo. Mason U. C.R. L.J.
- ISO 4: George Mason Univ. Civ. Rights Law J.

Indexing
- ISSN: 1049-4766
- OCLC no.: 21085585

Links
- Journal homepage

The George Mason University Civil Rights Law Journal is a law review run by students at the George Mason University School of Law. It published one or two issues each academic year from 1990 to 2006–2007, and three issues each year since then. The journal is published by William S. Hein & Co.

== History ==
The journal was established in 1990 in the wake of a rash of Supreme Court cases that undermined and weakened the effectiveness and purpose of the Civil Rights Act (42 U.S.C. 1983). Darrell Jackson, the law journal's first editor-in-chief, prefaced the inaugural volume with the assertion, "[The] Supreme Court will no longer act as a major guardian of minority rights. Because minority groups must now travel the path alone, George Mason University School of Law has created the Civil Rights Law Journal to provide guidance and to serve as a forum for civil rights issues."

The journal is published by a Board of Editors composed of select students at George Mason University School of Law. The journal covers civil rights related topics including race, gender, sexual orientation, religion, free speech, abortion rights, cruel and unusual punishment, search and seizure, voting rights, and rights of disabled people.

Beginning with Volume 20, the journal gives a "Best Note" award for its student-written pieces.

== Membership selection ==
First-year students and second-year evening students with a minimum 2.75 GPA may enter a competitive write-on to join the journal. The selection process takes into account individual's first-year grades, performance in the write-on competition, and Blue Book editing proficiency. The journal offers membership to somewhere between 15 and 20 percent of the first year law school class.

== Symposia and legal panels ==
Each year, the journal organizes a symposium on a current civil rights issue. In addition, the journal hosts occasional legal panels on a topic in civil rights law.

== Impact ==
In 2007, the journal was ranked sixth amongst student-edited civil rights law journals in the United States by Washington & Lee's law review rankings.

The United States Supreme Court cited Christopher R. Green's The Original Sense of the (Equal) Protection Clause: Subsequent Interpretation and Application (19 Geo. Mason U. C.R. L.J. 219 (2009)) in former Justice Stevens' dissent in McDonald v. City of Chicago.

== Notable alumni ==
- The journal's only alumnus to clerk at the Supreme Court of the United States was William Consovoy, who was editor-in-chief of the journal.
- Darrell Jackson, the journal's founding editor-in-chief, served several years as George Mason University's Dean for Diversity.

== See also ==
- George Mason Law Review
- Journal of Law, Economics & Policy
- National Security Law Journal
- List of law reviews in the United States
- Civil rights in the United States
- Law review
