= George Mason Law Review =

- Discipline: Law Review
- Language: English

Publication details
- Former names: International School of Law Review; George Mason Independent Law Review
- History: 1976 – present
- Frequency: 4/5 issues per year

Standard abbreviations
- Bluebook: Geo. Mason L. Rev.
- ISO 4: George Mason Law Rev.

Indexing
- ISSN: 1068-3801

Links
- Journal homepage

The George Mason Law Review is an independent law review run by students at the Antonin Scalia Law School of George Mason University. Founded in 1976 and partially re-founded after reorganization in 1995, it is the flagship law review of the Antonin Scalia Law School. The journal usually publishes four or five issues per year, with two of those issues dedicated to annual symposia including the journal's notable annual symposium that focuses on antitrust law.

The journal also publishes the online-only George Mason Law Review Forum, which is dedicated to publishing short-form legal scholarship on timely and newsworthy topics. Founded in 2023, the Forum operates on a rolling publication schedule, typically bringing a piece from acceptance to publication in a shorter period than the print journal.

== History ==
The Antonin Scalia Law School at George Mason University was formerly the International School of Law, whose student-run publication, the International School of Law Review, began in 1976. When the school became George Mason School of Law in 1979, the publication became the George Mason University Law Review. In 1992, the student-run law review briefly split from the law school's administration, publishing as the George Mason Independent Law Review. During this time, the George Mason Independent Law Review maintained a traditional law review format by publishing both professional and student works. While another law review under the name George Mason University Law Review only published articles written by the students of the law school. In the fall of 1995, pursuant to an agreement with the dean of the law school, the two law reviews merged and George Mason Independent Law Review began operating as the modern George Mason Law Review.

== Membership ==
Like most American law reviews, membership in the law review is granted through a competitive process. First-year students must participate in a Write-on competition after completing their final exams in the spring semester. The Law review then considers the student's first-year grades and performance in the write on to make offers of membership. Prospective members must be in the top 50 percent of their first-year law school class.

== George Mason Law Review Annual Symposium on Antitrust ==
Each year, the law review holds a symposium on antitrust law on the law school's campus in Arlington, Virginia. The symposium consists of a keynote address by a leader in the field of antitrust law followed by panels discussing aspects of antitrust law. Past speakers have included Makan Delrahim, Maureen Ohlhausen, Joshua D. Wright, J. Thomas Rosch, and Neelie Kroes. The law review publishes an issue dedicated to the symposium.

== Notable articles ==
Notable articles published in the George Mason Law Review include:

- Hausman, J. A., and G. K. Leonard. "Economic Analysis of Differentiated Products Mergers Using Real World Data." Geo. Mason L. Rev. 5 (1996): 321.
- Nelson, R. H. "Privatizing the Neighborhood: A Proposal to Replace Zoning with Private Collective Property Rights to Existing Neighborhoods." 7 Geo. Mason L. Rev. 827 (1998).
- Shapiro, C. "Exclusivity in Network Industries." 7 Geo. Mason L. Rev. 673 (1998).
- Salop, Steven C.; Romaine, R. Craig (1999). "Preserving Monopoly: Economic Analysis, Legal Standards, and Microsoft". George Mason Law Review. 7 (3): 617–72.
- Storzer, Roman P.; Picarello, Jr., Anthony R. (2001). "The Religious Land Use and Institutionalized Persons Act of 2000: A Constitutional Response to Unconstitutional Zoning Practices". George Mason Law Review. 9 (4): 929–1000.
- Mosteller, Robert P. (2008). "Exculpatory Evidence, Ethics, and the Road to the Disbarment of Mike Nifong: The Critical Importance of Full Open-File Discovery". George Mason Law Review. 15 (2): 257–318.
- Thompson, David C.; Wachtell, Melanie F. (2009). "An Empirical Analysis of Supreme Court Certiorari Petition Procedures: The Call for Response and the Call for the Views of the Solicitor General". George Mason Law Review. 16 (2): 237–302. SSRN 1377522.
- Kovacic, William E. (2009). "Rating the Competition Agencies: What Constitutes Good Performance?" (PDF). George Mason Law Review. 16 (4): 903–26.
- Laufer-Ukeles, Pamela; Blecher-Prigat, Ayelet (2013). "Between Function and Form: Towards a Differentiated Model of Functional Parenthood". George Mason Law Review. 20 (2): 419–84. SSRN 2151226.

== Elected Boards ==
Volume (year)	Editor-in-Chief	Executive Editor(s)	Managing Editor	Production Editor	Symposium Editor	Senior Forum Editor	Senior Articles Editor(s)	Senior Notes Editor	Senior Research Editor	Communications Editor	Developments Editor	Forum Editor(s)	Articles Editor(s)	Notes Editor(s)	Research Editor(s)	Associate Editor(s)	Other Positions
Vol. 34 (2026–2027)	Matthew Thomas	Tom Harrison, Liam McGettigan	Justin Evan Smith	Micayla Stoecker	Eric Ashcroft	Alex Reynolds	Reagan Connelly, Evan Poellinger	Madilynn Hewson	Marcelo De-Almeida	—	—	Colin Branham, Stephen Morris	Ella Chaffin, David Koster, C.J. Miller, Arlene Pradhuman, Andrew Smith	Ryan Goyer, Ben Gustafson, Aubrey Kirchhoff, Hannah Jane Upson	Genevieve Doctor, Ailan Evans, D.J. Hall, Ben Proctor, Kira Soricelli, Shon Stelman	—	—
Vol. 33 (2025–2026)	Nicholas Rodriguez	Christine Baltazar, Jack Shaffstall	Amelia Shook	Titus Schurter	Garrett Gillespie	Riley Marelli	Anthony Cash, Uros Ciric	Kiran H. Faiz	Savannah Telfer	Alex Whitehead	—	Alec Snell	Ethan Mack, Logan Markle, Alexander Phipps, Nicholas Sierco	Julia Dunning, Mick Rash, Kevin Stoll	Adam Anderson, Philip Koroshetz, Joshua Lloyd, Shane Shuma, Corbin Witt	—	—
Vol. 32 (2024–2025)	Peter Tucker	Jacob Hooper, JaKell Larson	David Gabbay	Emily Polinski Kraus	Samuel Stoner	Andrew Ceonzo	Savannah Griesinger, Caleb McClay	Maeve O'Leary	Alex Cook	Mia Fehrenbach	—	Megan Banke	Alfonso Gamboa, Susanna Goewey, Seth Lucas, John Russell	Sharon Le, Edward Linczer, Adam Marks, Madeline P. Smith	Joseph Elkach, Tyler Livingston, Morgan Salvato, Jack Winslow	—	—
Vol. 30 (2022–2023)	Greg Brown	Drew Bailey, Kevin Beck	Doug Horn	Mark Zanowicz	Tim Wieroniey	Tori Burke	Jamie Gray, Kevin Kehne	Brandon Beck	Aidan Wenzel	Noelle Peragine	—	Heather McShea	Makena Bonheim, Garrett Snedeker, Daniel Thetford	Roma Diseati, Antonia Mordino, Justin Shindo	Alexis Braswell, Nick Martini, Nicole McLaren, Apollo Yong	—	—
Vol. 29 (2021–2022)	Jennifer Cascone Fauver	Matthew Bargamin, Gary M. Bridgens	Blake Wortham	Helen Counts	Carly L. Hviding	—	Zachary Kobokovich	Elizabeth Grieco	Brittney A. Nochimson	—	Deena Lanier	Tabitha McPheron	Evelyn Johns, Michael Montoya, Alexis Romero, Andrew Strain	Patrick Griffo, Brandon Parker, Sahara Shrestha	Doug Boyle, Scott Laws, Meena Tadros, Brittney Wiesner	Kristin Bednarek, Alex Dardick, Oren Litwin, Caleb Peery, Michelle Story, Leigha Wentz, Stephanie Whiteley	—
Vol. 28 (2020–2021)	Lea Schild	Stephanie Comstock Ondrof, Cody Ray Milner	Mahlon J. Mowrer	Kevin E. P. Case	Timothy A. Swartz	—	Harrisson C. Kummer	Justin Angotti	Sydney Jolliffe	—	Sarah Christensen	—	Danny Bartle, Kirk D. Bowersox, Ethan S. Hoffman, Laura Ruppalt	Zach Villemez, David Wallach, Daniel Wilkinson	Harry L. Arnold, Gelane Diamond, Kristopher Hiser, Tuong-Anh Pham	Brady F. Clapp, Anne Cotter, Lillia J. Damalouji, Ruth G. Davila, Trenton Hafley, Mary Barkley Horn, Miranda Isaacs, Benjamin Janacek	—
Vol. 27 (2019–2020)	Conor D. Woodfin	Ashton L. Copeland, Richard J. Markel	Olivia Muller	Wendy Cousler	Evan Moore	—	Briana McLeod	Zackary Rogers	Conrad Meek	—	Gregory Wagner	—	Ryan Ansloan, Ross Broudy, Clayton T. Buckner, Emily Kvalheim	Olivia Gómez, Kyle McCauley, Anne Philpot	Josh McKenney, Evan McMahan, Stephanie Neville, Casey Watts	Robert Brosh, Giovanni Carillo, MJ Egan, Ian W. Fraser, Kate Gaziano, Victoria Glover, Jessica Hutto-Schultz, Taylor Klauza, Alec Royka	—
Vol. 19 (Spec. Issue)	Catherine Schmierer	Matthew R. McGuire	Kalynn Hughes	Mark DiGiovanni	Catherine Brown	—	Lora E. Barnhart Driscoll	Chelsea Sizemore	Paisly Bender	—	—	—	Sean Clerget, Angela Diveley, Stacey L. Sklaver	Alissa Dutrow, Emily Harp, Matthew Long	Robyn Burrows, Joshua Chamberlain, Meredith Schramm-Strosser	Stephen Foster, Carly Humphrey, James Kim	—
Vol. 18 (2010–2011)	Geoffrey B. Fehling	Anthony D. Peluso	Bret Lee	Michael Manteuffel	Isaac Post	—	Lindsey Champlin	Michael D'Anello	Cattleya Concepcion	—	—	—	Brendan Coffman, Joshua C. Cumby, Tony Tran	Mitchell A. Bashur, Aaron Brotman, Kendal Smith	Joseph Barrier, Nathan Chubb, Stephanie Cook	Bryan Andersen, Mitchell Calhoun, Kieran Carter, Jessica Farace	—
Vol. 17 (2009–2010)	Alyssa H. DaCunha	Darren H. Weiss	Mark A. Cowen	Taryn A. Elliott	Laura Marks O'Brien	—	David E. Pettit	George Ingham	Joshua Newborn	—	—	—	Adam Aft, Dylan S. Brown, Tom Cummins	Michael Rizzo, Craig Rust, Rosanne Rust	Kent A. Gibson, Austin Mills, Conor Reilly	Andrew Basler, Philip A. Cooke, Kyle Epting, Katie Polk, Ashley M. Sprague, Rachel Talbot, Erin Watkins	—
Vol. 16 (2008–2009)	Elizabeth F. Maher	Christopher Cazenave	Katherine Crytzer	James E. Rowland	Ashlie Lawton	—	Elizabeth L. Bahr	Thomas J. Craven	Donna Ostlund Woodward	—	—	—	Joseph E. Bain, Josh Blackman, Carroll Chancellor	Townsend L. Bourne, Joseph E. Judge, Alison Lima	Courtenay Canedy, Jonathan E. Hupp, Diane Taing	Joshua Dutill, Katherine Foley, Benjamin Haskins, Lauren Perotti, Katherine Ruffing, Bradford J. Sayler	—
Vol. 15 (2007–2008)	Lucy Jewett Wheatley	Claudia L. André	Alison R. Umberger	Andrew McNiven	Lauren Friend McKelvey	—	Timilin Kate Sanders	Elizabeth Bradshaw	Michael A. Petrino	—	—	—	Wendell Bartnick, Miranda Jones, G. Robert McLain Jr.	Richard J. Carey, Rebecca Ham Ormsbee, Jessica Hodges	William Krogh, Justin Simmons	Dyanne Griffith, Emily Halm Jenkins, Kate Manuel, Stacey Pratt, Ryan M. Schmalzle	—
Vol. 14 (2006–2007)	Sean W. Mullaney	Samantha Mortlock	Ashley Craw	Brandon Rule	Christopher H. Pruitt	—	Andrew Grossman	Katherine Dewart	Jamie Schey	—	—	—	Jesse Coleman, Tim Miano, Christopher T. Pickens	Anne Loomis, Anthony Schiavetti	Jennifer R. Moore, Peter M. Whelan	Dyanne Griffith, Sharon J. Kim, Brett Lavoie	—
Vol. 13 (2004–2005)	Michael B. LiCalsi	Elizabeth A. Owens	Deepa M. Menon	Zachary H. Mahshie	Lee Istrail	—	K. Adrienne S. Binnall	Michael W. Brooks	Michael Mateer	—	—	—	Beth Zeitlin Shaw, Matthew W. Spengler	Kimberly Graber, Elizabeth Phelps	Adrianna K. Marks, Rachel Polsky	Aimee E. DeFilippo, Timothy J. Keeler, Robert Lamborn, Andrew R. Sommer	—
Vol. 12 (2003–2004)	Michael P. DeGrandis	Matthew S. Sarelson	Brendan J. McMurrer	Andrew R. Sommer	Kristopher Henman	—	Andrew Habenicht	—	—	—	—	—	F. Chad Copier, Kate McSweeny	Joseph P. Moriarty, Nathan Wildermann	William W. Eldridge IV, Jonathan Rund	Rizwan Akmal, James Colling, Matthew E. Kelley, Adam Mandell, Jeremy J. Schofer	—
Vol. 11 (2002–2003)	Laura E. Zirkle	James N. Knaack	J. Justin McKenna Jr.	Joseph F. Weiss Jr.	Clair Smith	—	Lisa A. Pellegrino	—	—	—	—	—	Moin A. Yahya	James A. Ryan, Monica E. Scales	Brian Perryman, Sarah E. Wolf	Peter D. Irvine, Orest J. Jowyk	—
Vol. 10 (2001–2002)	Steven A. Fredley	Gregory S. Wagner	Jon E. Wright	Tricia J. Sadd	Andrew S. Cabana	—	—	—	—	—	—	—	Jennifer Sands Atkins, Nita Ghei, Elizabeth A. Harvey	Ellen Lynch, James H. Martin	Traci B. Eskildsen, Erik N. Frias	Karen E. Hickey, Lisa A. Hom, James P. Schaefer, John M. Wingate	—
Vol. 9 (2000–2001)	Elizabeth A. Keith	Thomas Ryan McCarthy	Clyde E. Findley	Rachel N. Reda	C. Todd Marks	—	—	—	—	—	—	—	C. Scott Meyers, Michael J. Nelson, Richard W. Roberts Jr.	Kristin K. Romero, Kimberly Sullivan Walker	Steven McLain	Aureliano Sanchez-Arango, Kenneth R. Baisden, Elizabeth J. Stevens	—
Vol. 8 (1999–2000)	Alice T. Armstrong	John F. Henault Jr.	Bradford R. Lucas	Joo Chung	Gerard M. Stegmaier	—	—	—	—	—	—	—	Lisa K. Leong, Timothy P. Tobin	Katherine Gasparek, Kimberly M. Hrabosky	Joshua Gessler	David J. Butzer, Larry L. Lewis, Matthew J. McCormack, Erin Slusser	—
Vol. 6 (1997–1998)	J. Andrew Read	Nicholas A. Widnell	Mark D. Dix	Philip F. Carpio	Bruce McCulloch	—	—	—	—	—	—	—	Jennifer E. Gladieux, Jesse D. Lyon	Jennifer J. Dacey, Michael G. Langan	Brock A. Swartzle	John D. Gilbody, Robert M. Hansen, Bryan M. Haynes, Katherine S. Milin	—
Vol. 5 (1996–1997)	Christopher F. Tate	—	Eric A. Adamson	F. Jesse Bausch	—	—	—	—	—	—	—	—	J. Linwood Smith, Jeanne M. Tanner	Sharon P. Lamb, Roland B. Ninomiya	—	Scott M. Faga, Nicholas A. Widnell, James R. Menker, Alexander I. Arezina	Michael J. Vernick (Business); Jeremy E. Carroll (Citations)
Vol. 3 (1994–1995)	Barry M. Parsons	—	DeLisa R. Kilpatrick	Raymond R. Pring Jr.	—	—	John E. Byrnes (Lead Articles)	—	—	—	—	—	Beth S. Ayres, Matthew H. Kraft (Manuscripts)	James V. Cole II, Michelle Patterson, Timothy S. Sampson	—	Janine Benton, Leslie Y. Norwalk	Andrew Roppel (Business); Andy Corea (Citations)
Vol. 2 (1993–1994)	Heather K. Bardot	—	Bonnie H. Hoffman	Elizabeth J. Leatherbarrow	—	—	Thomas K. Plunkett Jr. (Lead Articles)	—	—	—	—	—	Mary E. Riordan, Jennifer M. Roof (Manuscripts)	Anne-Marie Lund Kagy, Granta Y. Nakayama, Tina M. Pirrello	—	—	Marsha L. Garst (Business); Carol A. Simpson (Citations)
Vol. 1 (1992–1993)	Arthur E. Schmalz	—	Stacey Turner Caldwell	Christina L. Hosp	—	—	Anne Penney Miller (Lead Articles)	—	—	—	—	—	Steven J. Parent, Ritchenya A. Shepherd (Manuscripts)	Elliot P. Holar, Jim Hyde, Suzanne E. Sumpter, David M. Young	—	Ann M. Beimdiek, Mark D. Crawford	Eric C. Lund (Business)
