= Shughart =

Shughart is surname, which may refer to:

== People ==
- Randy Shughart (1958–1993), American soldier and Medal of Honor recipient
- William F. Shughart II (born 1947), American economist

== Other uses ==
- MV Shughart, a United States Navy ship, named after Randy Shughart

== See also ==
- Shugart (disambiguation)
