= Economides =

Economides (Greek: Οικονομίδης), also transliterated as Economidis, Oikonomides, "Ekonomidis", Economides", "Iconomides" or Oikonomidis, is a Greek surname. Notable people with the surname include:

- Georgios Oikonomidis (born 1978), Greek sprinter
- Giorgos Economides (born 1990), Cypriot footballer
- Konstantinos Economidis (born 1977), Greek tennis player
- Luc Economides (born 1999), French figure skater
- Nicholas Economides, American economist
- Nikolaos Oikonomides (1934–2000), Greek-Canadian Byzantist
- Phil Economidis, Australian rugby league coach
- Yannis Economides, Cypriot film director
