= William C. Bradford =

American lawyer and academic

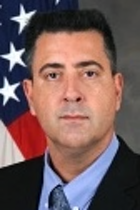
- Bradford in 2015
- Born: c. 1964 (age 61–62); Lansing, Michigan, United States
- Education: Northwestern University; Harvard University; University of Miami

William C. Bradford (born c. 1964) is an American lawyer and scholar of political science. He previously served in United States Department of Energy as the Director, Office of Indian Energy until resigning on August 31, 2017, after derogatory and controversial comments he had posted on the Internet were publicized.

He attained significant media attention in 2015 for a scholarly article which argued that a small cadre of legal academics in U.S. universities was sapping the United States' "will to fight" in the global war on terrorism and called for treason charges against and the imprisonment of such academics. Bradford was an associate professor of law at the Indiana University Robert H. McKinney School of Law, before resigning in 2005 after a dispute over tenure and under suspicions of exaggerating his military service. He was also briefly an assistant professor at the United States Military Academy before resigning in 2015 following the controversy stemming from the aforementioned article.

== Personal life ==
Bradford is married with three children. He is a member of the Chiricahua band of the Apache nation.

== Education and career ==
Bradford earned a PhD in Political Science from Northwestern University with major fields in International Relations, U.S. Foreign Policy, and Comparative Politics. His 1995 doctoral dissertation is titled "United States foreign policy decision-making in Arab-Israeli crises: The association of United States presidential personality constructs with political and military crisis outcomes" (AAT 9537394). Bradford earned an LL.M. from Harvard University in International Law, Human Rights Law, and the Law of Armed Conflict. He graduated from the University of Miami School of Law.

Following his resignation from Indiana University in 2005, Bradford was briefly a visiting faculty member at the William & Mary Law School. He was also a lecturer at the United States Coast Guard Academy. He subsequently claimed to be an associate professor at the Near East South Asia Center for Strategic Studies in the National Defense University; however, according to an August 29, 2015 article in The Guardian, a representative of the National Defense University said Bradford was a contractor at the Defense Department-run institution, but "never an NDU employee nor an NDU professor".

Bradford has authored several scholarly articles.

== Controversy ==
=== Tenure controversy ===
Bradford joined the faculty of Indiana University Robert H. McKinney School of Law in the fall of 2002 after serving in the Army Reserve. In 2005 Bradford accused Professor Florence Roisman of opposing his tenure because of some of his conservative views. The official reason given was that Prof. Bradford was "uncollegial." The feud became a national one when Fox News and FrontPage magazine.com, among others, continually reported on the controversy. Bradford claimed that his support of the Iraq War and his refusal to sign a letter in defense of Ward Churchill were contributing factors. "The presumption was that I've got to sign this thing because I'm an Indian, but I can't do that," he said. Roisman has denied most of Bradford's claims and school administrators pointed out that Bradford never actually applied for tenure and as such no vote to approve or deny tenure to Bradford was held. He resigned from the university shortly thereafter.

=== Controversial article and resignation from West Point ===
In an article in the Spring/Summer 2015 issue of the National Security Law Journal, Bradford argued that "lawful targets" for the U.S. military in the fight against Islamic radicalism could include "Islamic holy sites", "law school facilities, scholars' home offices and media outlets where they give interviews." In a statement to The Guardian, a spokesman for the United States Military Academy said that the article was written and accepted for publication before Bradford was employed at West Point, and that "The views in the article are solely those of Bradford and do not reflect those of the Department of Defense, the United States Army, [or] the United States Military Academy." On August 24, 2015, the National Security Law Journal's editor-in-chief called the article's publication "a mistake".

The journal has posted a rebuttal by George Mason University (the journal's host institution) law professor Jeremy A. Rabkin. Robert M. Chesney, a law professor at the University of Texas at Austin, the author of one of the papers discussed in Bradford's article told The Guardian: "It's very hard to take this seriously ... except insofar as he may actually be teaching nonsense like this to cadets at West Point."

As a result of this article, and the scrutiny it generated concerning his credentials, Bradford resigned from his position as Assistant Professor at the U.S. Military Academy on August 30, 2015, after only a month at the institution.

=== Inflammatory comments ===
In June 2017, the Washington Post reported that Bradford had from a now-deleted Twitter account "tweeted a slew of disparaging remarks about the real and imagined ethnic, religious and gender identities of former president Barack Obama, Facebook co-founder Mark Zuckerberg, TV news host Megyn Kelly and Japanese Americans during World War II." Bradford called Obama a "Kenyan creampuff", "the Tehran candidate" and expressed concern that Obama would stay in office beyond his term and that a military coup would be needed to overthrow him. In response to a story that the Trump administration planned to purge climate-change policy-makers, Bradford tweet "Soon, 'climate change' cultists will be pitied as the nuts they always were." On the 2016 anniversary of the internment of Japanese-Americans during WWII, Bradford stated "it was necessary". He called Zuckerberg a "little arrogant self-hating Jew", and then-Fox News host Megyn Kelly as "MegOBgyn Kelly." He stated that "women have no business in combat" and that he would "shoot anyone who comes for my daughters".

Bradford later apologized for the tweets.

Similar comments were found to have been made by a Disqus account traced to Bradford, from which it was posted that "Obama is the son of a fourth-rate p&*n actress and w@!re". Bradford denied posting this comment, asserting that the posting of these comments was the result of his account being hacked.
