= Steve Andersen =

Steve Andersen is a retired rear admiral who was Judge Advocate General and Chief Counsel of the United States Coast Guard.

== Career ==
Early in his career, Steve Andersen was stationed aboard USCGC Steadfast. He later served as commanding officer of USCGC Sturgeon Bay. Additionally, he was deployed to serve as part of NATO Training Mission - Afghanistan.

Andersen assumed the roles of Judge Advocate General and Chief Counsel in 2016 before retiring from the military four years later. Decorations he received during his career include the Bronze Star Medal. As a civilian, he joined the Federal Maritime Commission.

== Education ==
- United States Coast Guard Academy
- George Mason University School of Law
