= William Eldridge =

William Eldridge may refer to:

- Bill Eldridge, Australian producer
- William W. Eldridge IV, American General District Court Judge for the 26th Judicial District of Virginia
- William Eldridge Brooks (born 1971), American former professional football player and sportswriter covering the National Football League for Sports Illustrated
- William Eldridge "Bill" Frenzel (1928–2014), member of the United States House of Representatives from Minnesota
- William Eldridge Odom (1932–2008), United States Army lieutenant general who served as Director of the National Security Agency under President Ronald Reagan

== See also ==
- William Aldridge 1737–1797), English nonconformist minister
