= USCGC Sturgeon Bay =

1988 American coast guard cutter

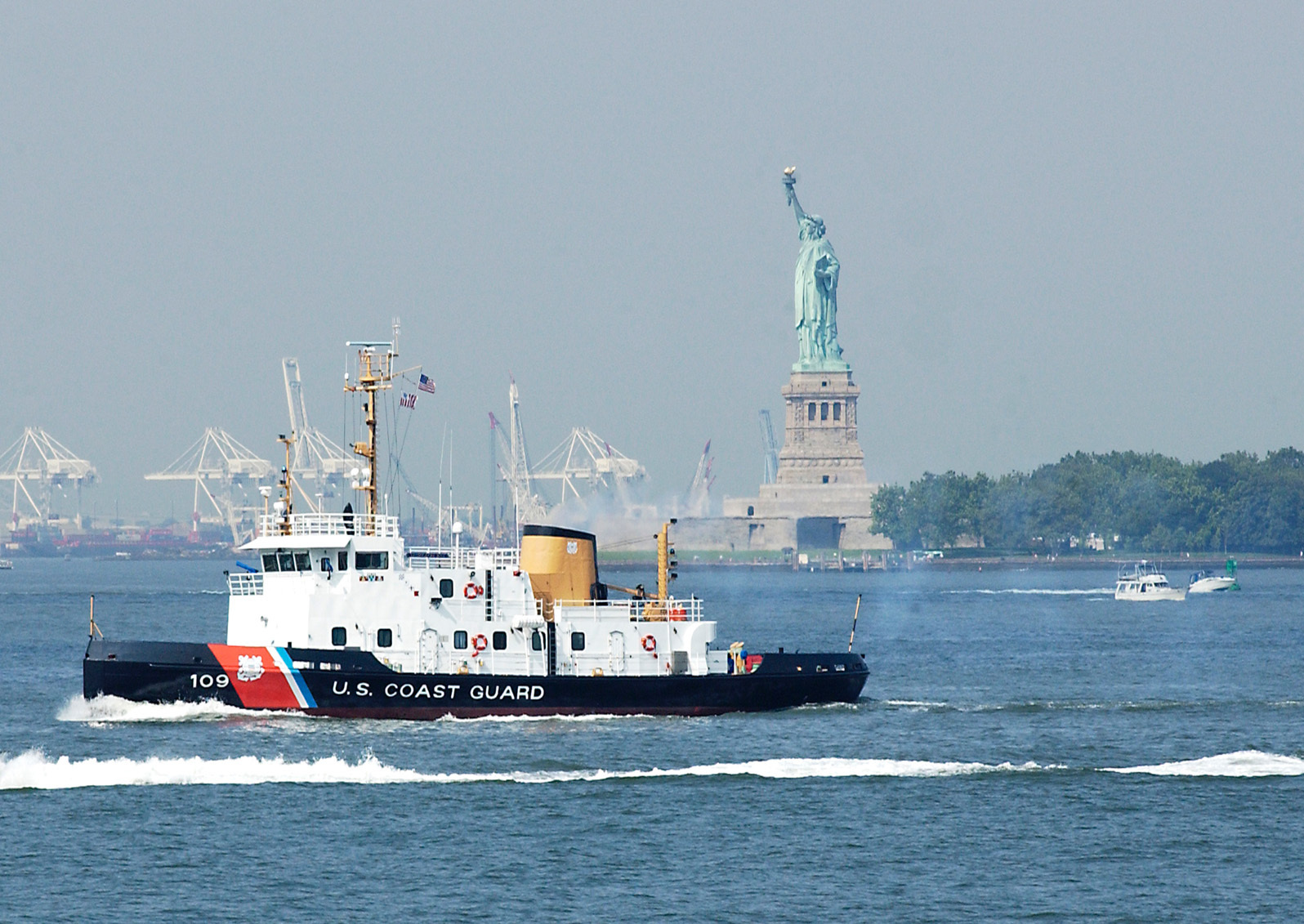
- USCGC Sturgeon Bay (WTGB-109)

History

United States
- Name: Sturgeon Bay
- Namesake: Sturgeon Bay, Wisconsin
- Builder: Bay City Marine Incorporated
- Launched: 1987
- Commissioned: 1988
- Home port: Bayonne, New Jersey
- Identification: IMO number: 8635198; MMSI number: 366999984; Callsign: NSXB
- Status: In active service

General characteristics
- Class & type: 140-foot Bay-class icebreaking tug (WTGB)
- Displacement: 662 tons
- Length: 140 ft (43 m)
- Beam: 37.5 ft (11.4 m)
- Propulsion: Two Fairbanks-Morse diesel engines

USCGC Sturgeon Bay (WTGB 109) is the newest of the United States Coast Guard 140-foot (43 m) Bay-class cutters. Homeported in Bayonne, New Jersey, the primary missions of Sturgeon Bay and her crew are Domestic Icebreaking and Ports, Waters, & Coastal Security. During the winter months, Sturgeon Bay is responsible for providing search and rescue capabilities to the ice-covered areas in New York City and the Hudson Valley, as well as throughout coastal New England. The cutter also facilitates the safe navigation of commercial product, including gasoline and heating oil, through the ice-choked Hudson River from New York City to Albany. All Bay-class cutters, including Sturgeon Bay, use a low-pressure-air hull lubrication or bubbler system that forces air and water between the hull and ice. This system improves icebreaking capabilities by reducing resistance against the hull, reducing horsepower requirements.

In addition to ice breaking, Sturgeon Bay is heavily involved in providing waterside security for the port of New York/New Jersey, the busiest port on the East Coast. Sturgeon Bay is also responsible for monitoring vessel traffic, enforcing boating regulations for recreational and commercial vessels, and acting as lead security for high-profile events in the port.

Sturgeon Bay is crewed by 18 personnel, consisting of 15 enlisted members and 3 officers. She was built by Bay City Marine in San Diego, California, launched on 12 September 1987, and commissioned on 20 August 1988. Her overall length is 140 feet with a beam of 37 feet, displacing 662 tons.

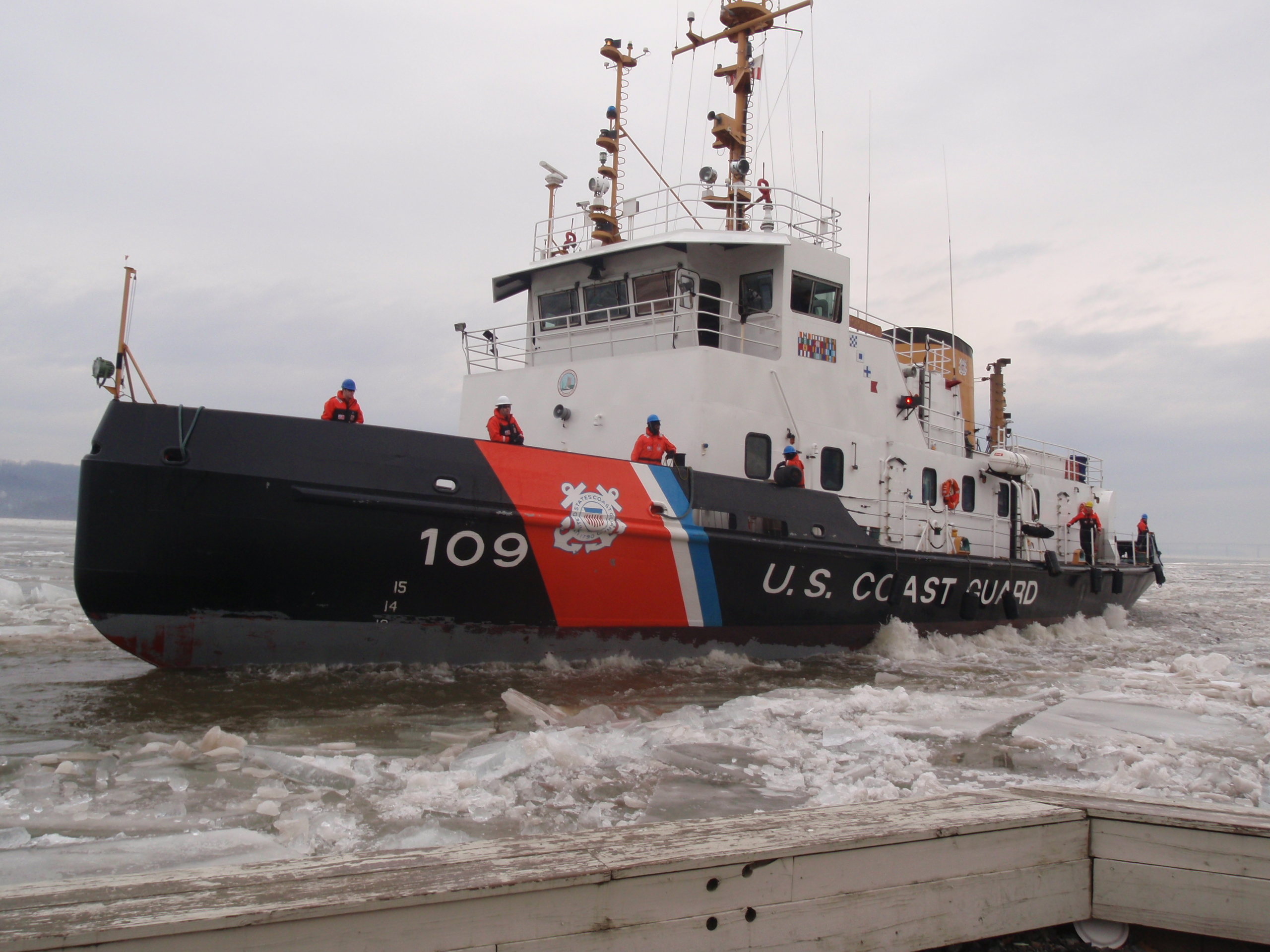
Cutter Sturgeon Bay at Rhinecliff landing, 2014

== See also ==
- USCGC Mobile Bay (WTGB-103)
- USCGC Penobscot Bay (WTGB-107)
