= Florence Roisman =

American law professor

Florence Wagman Roisman is the William F. Harvey Professor of Law at Indiana University Robert H. McKinney School of Law. Roisman's work largely focuses on housing discrimination, issues around race and property rights.

== Early life ==
Roisman was born in February 1939. She lived in the Bronx of New York City until her junior year of high school, when her family, which included her parents and younger sister, moved to Mount Vernon, New York. She is of Polish and Russian descent.

Roisman moved to Mount Vernon, New York, for her final two years of high school, where she was active in the drama club and served as a yearbook editor. She graduated at age 16 and enrolled at the University of Connecticut, chosen by her parents for its affordable tuition. She graduated in 1959 with a double major in English and history, earning distinction in both subjects and membership in Phi Beta Kappa.

== Legal and academic work ==
Roisman received a Bachelor of Arts degree in 1959 from the University of Connecticut with high honors, a distinction in English and in History, as well as a membership in Phi Beta Kappa. She earned an LL.B. degree cum laude in 1963 from Harvard Law School.

=== Views ===
Roisman has stated she believes white supremacy and racial dominance are currently a prominent factor in property discrimination in the United States. When asked "How did you see yourself bringing about an impact on the students" Roisman stated "One thing that I try to do is to expose people to issues and problems and ways of thinking to which they might not otherwise be exposed. Most obviously, in my Property course, I'm putting in a lot of race, a lot of poverty issues. These are not people who had chosen to take a course with me. They have no choice. They were assigned to me. They may have no interest in racial issues or poverty issues or equity issues and I confront them with those issues." In a prominent lecture at IUPUI, called the "Last Lecture," Roisman also stated that the United States is built on racial injustice.

Following these views, she co-authored a casebook with Professor Stacy E. Seicshnaydre (JD) and Professor Rigel C. Oliveri (JD) on housing law titled The Right to Fair Housing: Cases, Statutes, and Context, published February 2025. In reference to herself and her co-authors, Roisman stated "we all believe that housing discrimination and segregation are central problems in the U.S. today and are pleased to have produced a book that others can use to teach this complex subject."

== Controversies ==
=== Christmas Tree Removal ===
In 2003, Roisman, citing her Jewish faith, complained about the sectarian nature of the placement of a Christmas tree in the IU McKinney School of Law lobby. Roisman stated, in an article supporting her complaint about the tree "...this is a time of heightened religious and cultural intolerance." Dean of Students Tony Tarr took the tree down, but disagreed with Roisman's assessment of the legal status regarding Christmas trees, saying "The U.S. Supreme Court has ruled Christmas tress are secular holiday symbols."

=== Professor William Bradford Tenure Dispute ===
In 2005 Roisman was accused of opposing the tenure of Prof. William Bradford because of some of his conservative views. The feud became a national one when Fox News and FrontPage Magazine, among others, continually reported on the controversy. Bradford claimed that his support of the Iraq War and his refusal to sign a letter in defense of Ward Churchill that was circulated by Roisman were contributing factors and that Roisman "engineered" the vote against him. Roisman has publicly denied most of Bradford's claims.

In December 2005, retired Army Lt. Col. Keith R. Donnelly, then a recent IU McKinney law grad, contacted The Indianapolis Star, suspicious of Bradford's claims that he served in Desert Storm and that he had been awarded a Silver Star. Both Donnelly and the Star independently requested Bradford's army records, which "showed he was in the Army reserve from Sept. 30, 1995, to Oct. 23, 2001. He was discharged as a second lieutenant. He had no active duty. He was in military intelligence, not infantry. He received no awards." (For reference, Desert Storm started on August 2, 1990, and ended February 28, 1991.) Bradford resigned, effective January 1, 2006.

== Awards ==
In 2010 Roisman was awarded the "Servant of Justice Award" by the Legal Aid Society of the District of Columbia.

In 2011 she received the Cushing Niles Dolbeare Lifetime Service Award from the National Low Income Housing Coalition.

In 2014 she received the M. Shanara Gilbert Human Rights Award from the Society of American Law Teachers (SALT). She was given the award during the group's annual dinner in New York City.
