= Martha Boneta =

American policy advisor

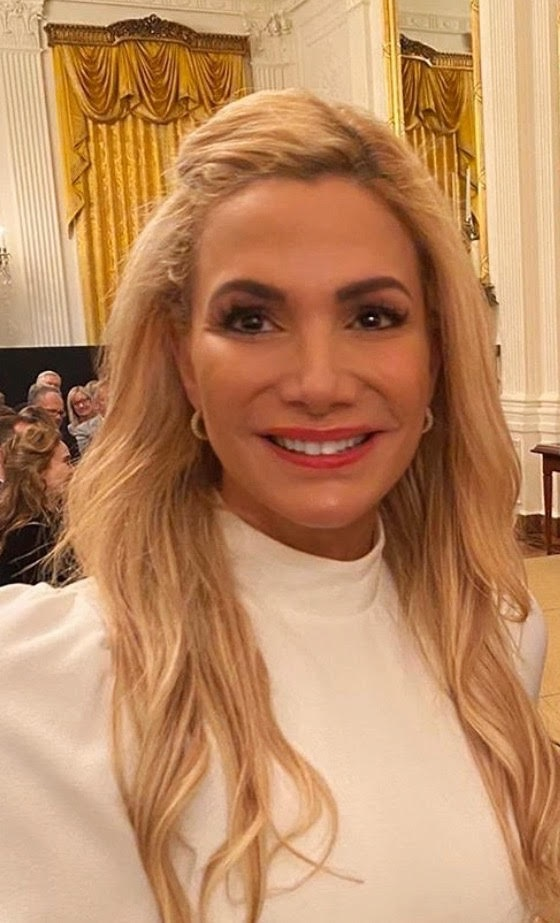
- Education: George Mason School of Law
- Occupations: Policy advisor, commentator, farmer
- Known for: Boneta Act (2014) in Virginia Code § 15.2-22886 and § 3.2-6400
- Notable work: Farming in Fear (2015 film)

Martha Boneta is an American policy advisor, commentator, and farmer who is known for her role in the passage of a landmark right-to-farm law in the Commonwealth of Virginia. She was featured in the 2015 documentary film Farming in Fear.

== Education ==
Boneta earned a Juris Doctor degree from George Mason School of Law.

== Career ==
In 2006, Boneta purchased a 65-acre property in Paris, Virginia called Liberty Farm.

Boneta was featured in the 2015 documentary Farming in Fear. The film documented her farming and advocacy which resulted in numerous television appearances for Boneta.
