= Christopher DeMuth =

American lawyer (born 1946)

Chris DeMuth
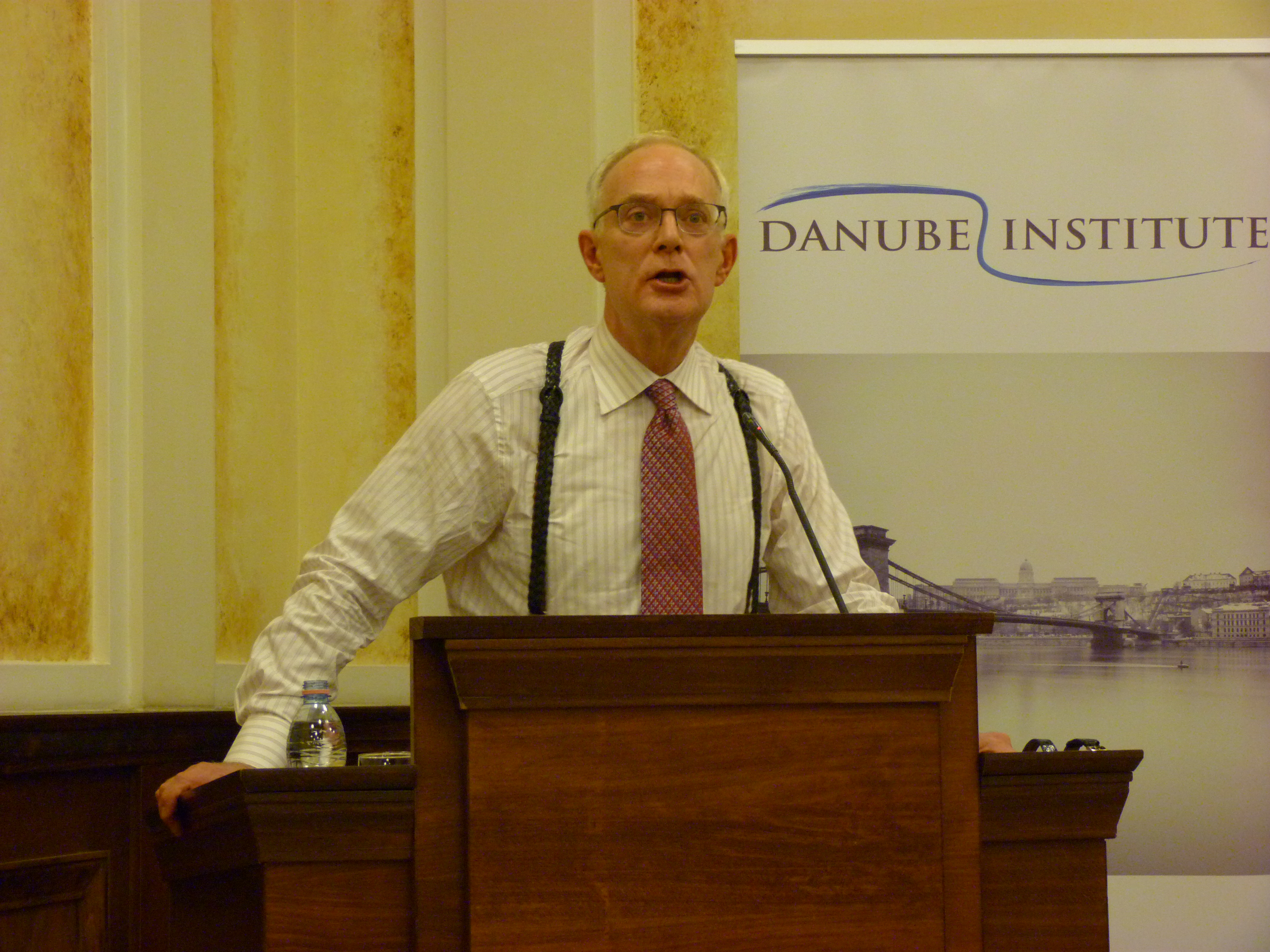
- DeMuth in 2014

Administrator of the Office of Information and Regulatory Affairs
- In office October 1981 – May 1984
- President: Ronald Reagan
- Preceded by: James C. Miller III
- Succeeded by: Douglas H. Ginsburg

Personal details
- Born: August 5, 1946 (age 79) Kenilworth, Illinois, U.S.
- Party: Republican
- Spouse: Susan
- Children: 3
- Education: Harvard University (BA); University of Chicago (JD)
- Website: Official website

Christopher C. DeMuth (born August 5, 1946) is an American lawyer and a distinguished fellow at the Hudson Institute, as well as director of the National Conservatism conference organized by the Edmund Burke Society. He was the president of the American Enterprise Institute (AEI), a conservative think tank, from 1986 to 2008. DeMuth is widely credited with reviving AEI's fortunes after its near-bankruptcy in 1986 and leading the institute to new levels of influence and growth. Before joining AEI, DeMuth worked on regulatory issues in the Ronald Reagan administration.

== Early life and education ==
Christopher DeMuth was born on August 5, 1946, in Kenilworth, Illinois. He attended Lawrenceville School in Lawrence Township, New Jersey, where he graduated in 1964. He then attended Harvard College, graduating in 1968.

== Career ==
After graduating from Harvard College, he worked in the White House during the Nixon administration, where he helped draft speeches on environmentalism, affordable housing, and women's issues. In his youth, he was a member of the politically moderate Ripon Society. After attending law school at the University of Chicago, he worked for law firm Sidley & Austin, the Consolidated Rail Corporation, and Harvard Kennedy School at Harvard University, where he taught that corporations should not be racist because that would put them at a competitive disadvantage if they were not hiring the best personnel regardless of race, and would therefore go out of business.

When Ronald Reagan took office in 1981, DeMuth joined the Reagan administration as administrator for information and regulatory affairs at the Office of Management and Budget and executive director of the Presidential Task Force on Regulatory Relief. He was known as Reagan's "deregulation czar."

DeMuth later ran an economics consulting firm and edited and published Regulation magazine, published by AEI.

=== American Enterprise Institute president ===
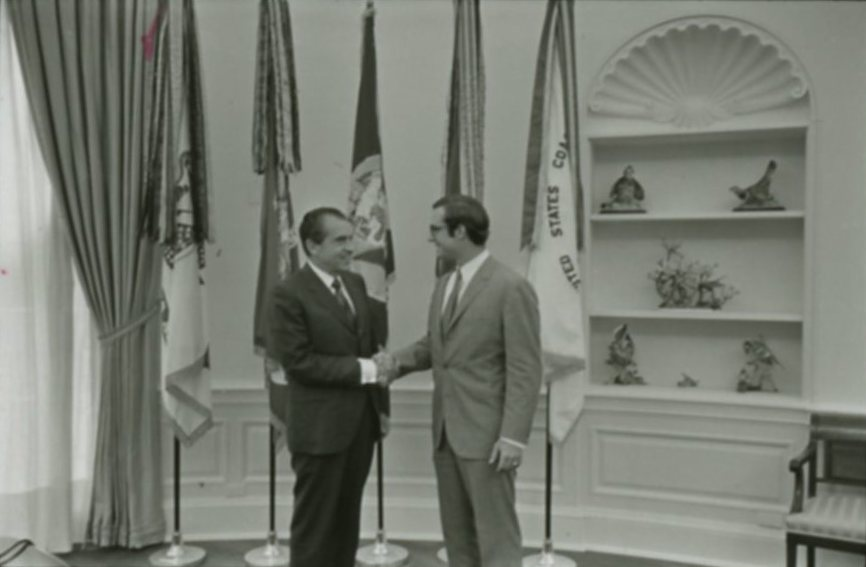
DeMuth greeting President Richard Nixon in 1970

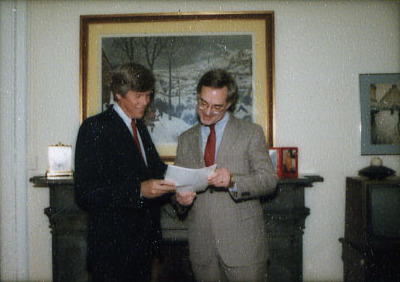
DeMuth with Connie Mack in 1984

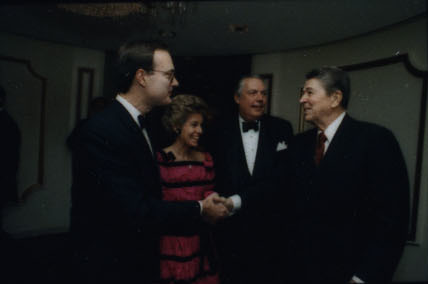
DeMuth greeting President Ronald Reagan in 1988

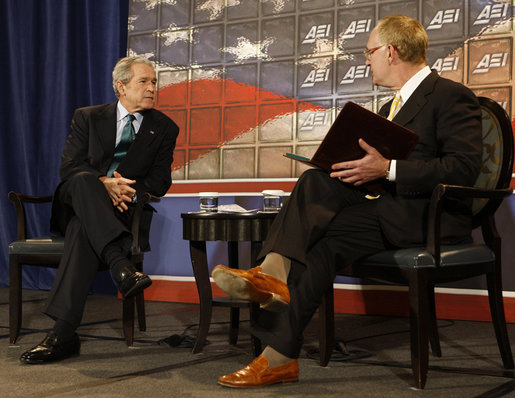
DeMuth moderating a question-and-answer session with President George W. Bush in 2008

DeMuth is said to have read American Enterprise Institute publications as an undergraduate and used them as a lecturer at Harvard. He was appointed president of AEI at a time of crisis for the institute, after the turbulent presidency of William J. Baroody Jr. AEI was a respected institution, but Baroody had been careful to keep AEI in the political mainstream.

During DeMuth's tenure, AEI turned further to the political right wing. DeMuth returned the institute to its conservative and small-government principles, allowing it to compete with The Heritage Foundation and Cato Institute, and bringing in more money from conservative foundations. At the beginning of his tenure, AEI was in severe financial distress. DeMuth restored AEI's financial fortunes, eliminating $9 million in debt and generating an asset balance of over $75 million. He also more than tripled AEI's budget during his presidency. Academic David M. Lampton writes that during DeMuth's tenure, AEI was responsive to the financial power of "America's hard right".

DeMuth presided over the institute as a number of high-profile scholars joined AEI, including Charles Murray, Richard and Lynne Cheney, Michael Barone, James K. Glassman, Newt Gingrich, Karl Zinsmeister, and Ayaan Hirsi Ali. As many as twenty AEI scholars served in the George W. Bush administration. AEI scholars also influenced the administration. Announcing his departure from AEI in 2007, DeMuth noted that the Iraq surge strategy was devised at AEI. DeMuth oversaw the creation of an AEI magazine, the founding a joint center on regulation with the Brookings Institution, where he was a fellow, the expansion of AEI's publications, the founding of AEI's National Research Initiative to underwrite and promote research by university-based academics and independent scholars, a reorientation of AEI's foreign policy division to focus on the Middle East, and the merger of the National Legal Center for the Public Interest into AEI to form the AEI Legal Center for the Public Interest.

In addition to promoting the role of think tanks in public policy research and the flexibility that they have in developing innovative ideas over long periods of time, DeMuth has also been bullish on the role of the corporation in U.S. life. "[T]hey are . . . the single most important positive force in American politics," he said in 1992. "The corporation is the transmission belt of much of our saving, prosperity, and progress. It is the place where many Americans pursue their vocations and spend most of their lives," he said in 2007. "The corporation is a vital, reality-based counterweight to those for whom politics is primary."

DeMuth announced his retirement as president in October 2007, and became a senior fellow at AEI at the beginning of 2009. His announcement was met with praise and criticism. Conservative writers referred to him as "charming" and "brilliant" and wrote: "It is just remotely possible that there may be someone whose contributions to American intellectual life over the past two decades have equaled those of Christopher DeMuth." Liberal critics have noted their disapproval of DeMuth.

Since retiring as president of AEI, DeMuth has held the D.C. Searle Chair there, researching government regulation, culture, and U.S. politics. He has also been active in promoting the work of prominent 20th century U.S. political thinkers, calling them proponents of ideas "timely, topical, pertinent, and relevant to today."

=== National Conservatism ===
In 2019, DeMuth joined American-Israeli scholar Yoram Hazony in organizing the first National Conservatism conference. He has been the main director for controversial conference group ever since. He has written extensively on the need for a new American nationalism.

== Personal life ==
DeMuth is married to Susan DeMuth, a physician, and they have three children. He is a board member of State Farm.

== Bibliography ==
- Christopher DeMuth and William Kristol, eds. The Neoconservative Imagination: Essays in Honor of Irving Kristol. Washington: AEI Press, 1995. (ISBN 0844738999)
- Robert W. Crandall, Christopher DeMuth, Robert W. Hahn, Robert E. Litan, Pietro S. Nivola, Paul R. Portney. An Agenda for Federal Regulatory Reform. Washington: AEI Press, 1997. (ISBN 0-8447-7104-X)
- Christopher DeMuth and Yuval Levin, eds. Religion and the American Future. Washington: AEI Press, 2008. (ISBN 978-0-8447-4259-5)

Non-profit organization positions
Preceded by Paul McCracken; Acting	President of the American Enterprise Institute; 1986–2008	Succeeded by Arthur C. Brooks
