= USCGC Thunder Bay =

Bay-class tugboat of the United States Coast Guard

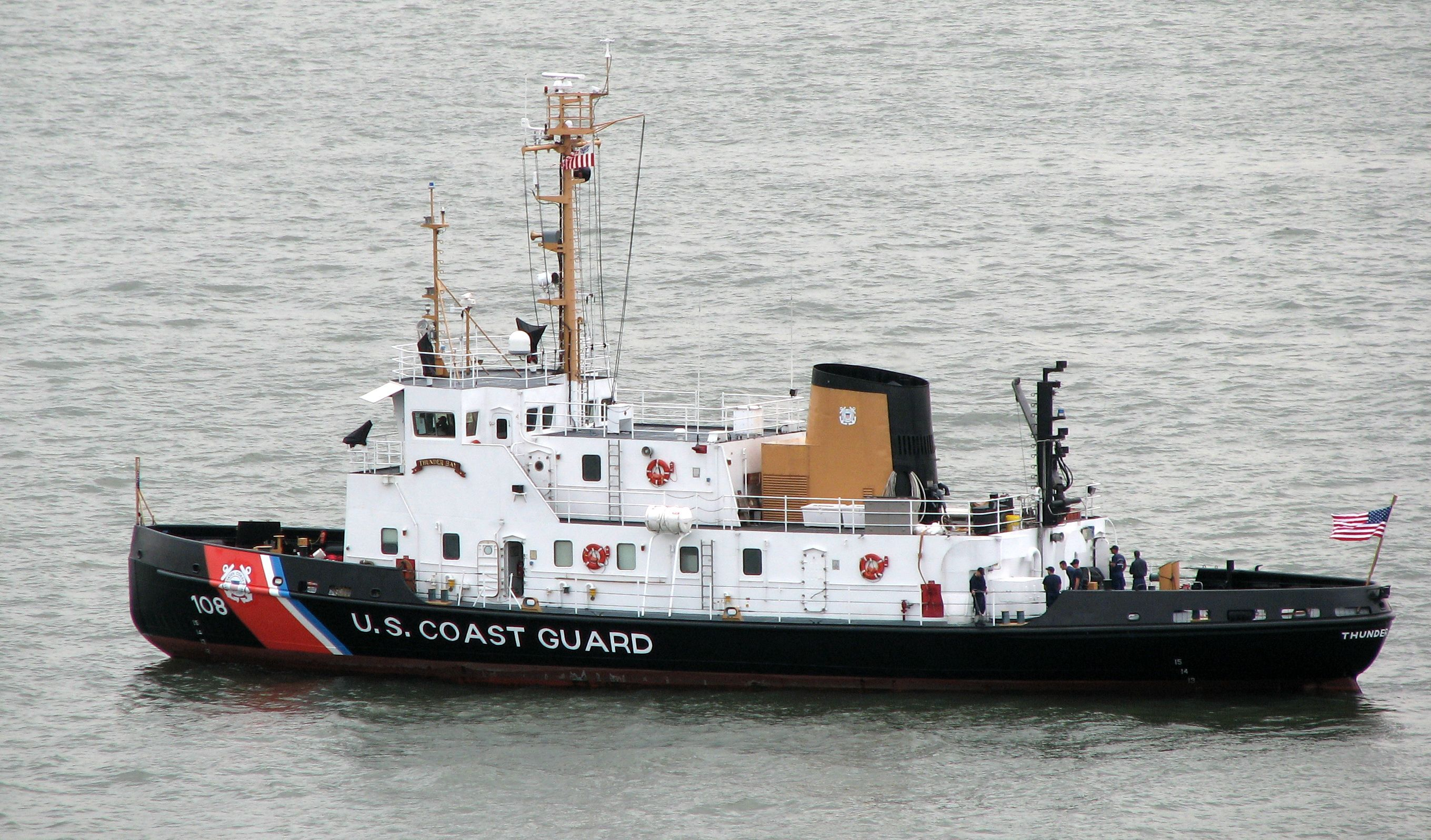
- USCGC Thunder Bay

History

United States
- Name: Thunder Bay
- Namesake: Thunder Bay
- Builder: Bay City Marine Inc.
- Launched: 31 July 1985
- Commissioned: 1986
- Home port: Rockland
- Identification: IMO number: 8635203; MMSI number: 366999983; Callsign: NNTB; Hull number: WTGB-108
- Honors and awards: See Awards
- Status: Active

General characteristics
- Class & type: Bay-class tugboat
- Displacement: 662 t (652 long tons)
- Length: 42.7 m (140 ft)
- Beam: 11.4 m (37 ft 5 in)
- Draft: 3.8 m (12 ft 6 in)
- Propulsion: 2 × Fairbanks-Morse diesel engines; 1 × Westinghouse DC motor; Westinghouse DC generators
- Speed: 14.7 knots (27.2 km/h; 16.9 mph)
- Range: 1,500 nmi (2,800 km; 1,700 mi) at 14.7 knots; 3,500 nmi (6,500 km; 4,000 mi) at 12 knots (22 km/h; 14 mph); 6,000 nmi (11,000 km; 6,900 mi) at 10 knots (19 km/h; 12 mph)
- Complement: 3 officers and 14 enlisted
- Armament: 2 × M240 machine guns

USCGC Thunder Bay (WTGB-108) is the eighth vessel of the Bay-class tugboat built in 1985 and operated by the United States Coast Guard. The ship was named after a bay in the U.S. state of Michigan on Lake Huron. She is homeported in Rockland, Maine.

== Design ==
The 140-foot (43 m) Bay-class tugboats are operated primarily for domestic icebreaking duties. They are named after American bays and are stationed mainly in the Northeastern United States and the Great Lakes.

WTGBs use a low-pressure, air-hull lubrication or bubbler system that forces air and water between the hull and ice. This system improves icebreaking capabilities by reducing resistance against the hull, thus reducing horsepower requirements. They can break up to 30 inches of ice continuously.

== Construction and career ==
Thunder Bay was built by the Bay City Marine Inc., in Tacoma, Washington, in 1985. She was launched on 31 July 1985 and later commissioned in 1986.

Thunder Bay is homeported in Rockland, Maine. During icebreaking season, Thunder Bay frequently breaks the Penobscot River for ice clearing and flood prevention, but may also surge to the Hudson River in New York to assist when necessary.

On 4 February 2021, Thunder Bay conducted an icebreaking mission at the Penobscot River. On 18 June, the ship finished the In-Service Vessel Sustainment program and departed Coast Guard Yard in Curtis Bay, Maryland.

== Awards ==
- Transportation 9-11 Ribbon
- Coast Guard Presidential Unit Citation
- Secretary of Transportation Outstanding Unit Award
- Coast Guard Unit Commendation
- Coast Guard Meritorious Unit Commendation
- Coast Guard Meritorious Team Commendation
- Coast Guard Bicentennial Unit Commendation
- National Defense Service Medal
- Global War on Terrorism Service Medal
- Humanitarian Service Medal
- Coast Guard Special Operations Service Ribbon
- Coast Guard Sea Service Ribbon
