= Bay City Marine Incorporated =

Shipbuilder in San Diego County, California

Bay City Marine Incorporated is a shipbuilder based in National City, California near San Diego.

== History ==
Founded in 1968 (and incorporated in 1971), Bay City Marine has built and maintained vessels for the NOAA, United States Navy and United States Coast Guard.

== List of ships built ==
- Built four of the newer Bay Class icebreaking tugs for United States Coast Guard:
  - USCGC Morro Bay (WTGB-106)
  - USCGC Penobscot Bay (WTGB-107)
  - USCGC Thunder Bay (WTGB-108)
  - USCGC Sturgeon Bay (WTGB-109)

A fifth ship, Curtis Bay (WTGB-110), was cancelled and never built.
