= FantasySCOTUS =

American legal fantasy league for the US Supreme Court

FantasySCOTUS is an online fantasy league created by Josh Blackman. FantasySCOTUS was subsequently acquired by LexPredict, LLC.

Those participating in the league predict how each member of the United States Supreme Court will rule on any given case. As of 2014, more than 25,000 had signed up. A high school version was created with the goal of raising awareness of constitutional law.

It is credited with correctly predicting the 2015 Supreme Court rulings that same-sex couples are constitutionally entitled to marry and upholding a key funding platform of the Affordable Care Act (ACA), sometimes termed “Obamacare.”
