= William F. Shughart II =

American economist and researcher (born 1947)

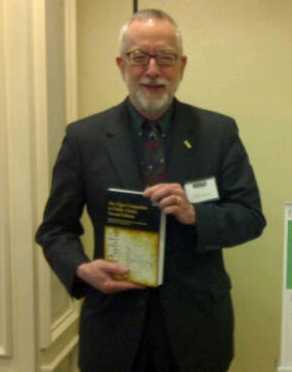
- Shughart in 2018
- Born: December 3, 1947 (age 78); Harrisburg, Pennsylvania, U.S.
- Education: Ph.D in Economics
- Alma mater: Texas A&M University
- Occupations: Economist, professor, author
- Employer: Utah State University
- Title: J. Fish Smith Professor in Public Choice

William Franklin Shughart II (born December 3, 1947) is an American economist. He is the J. Fish Smith Professor in Public Choice at the Jon M. Huntsman School of Business at Utah State University, and a Distinguished Research Advisor and senior fellow at the Independent Institute. He has served as the editor-in-chief of Public Choice (until 2022), senior associate editor of the Southern Economic Journal, and associate editor of the Independent Review.

== Education ==
Shughart completed his B.A. in economics in 1969 followed by M.S. in economics in 1970 from Texas A&M University. In 1973, as part of his military service, he worked as a courier for the Joint Chiefs of Staff and as a systems analyst at the Center for Naval Analyses (now CNA Corp.). After his honorable discharge from the U.S. Navy, he received his Ph.D. in economics from Texas A&M University.

== Career ==
Right after completing his Ph.D., Shughart taught at the University of Arizona in 1978–1979. He then worked at the Federal Trade Commission as a staff economist. In 1982, he left his position as the special assistant to the Director of the Bureau of Economics at the Federal Trade Commission to join Clemson University as an assistant professor.

Shughart left Clemson University in 1985 and joined George Mason University as an associate professor of economics and a research associate at the Center for Study of Public Choice. Three years later, he left George Mason University and started teaching at the University of Mississippi. At the University of Mississippi, he was appointed to the P.M.B. Self, William King Self and Henry C. Self Free Enterprise Chair. In 1998, he was named an F.A.P Barnard Distinguished Professor and held a Robert M. Hearin Chair at the University of Mississippi.

In 2011, Shughart became professor emeritus at the University of Mississippi and was appointed as J. Fish Smith Professor in Public Choice at Utah State University's Jon M. Huntsman School of Business.

Shughart has served the Southern Economic Association for most of his academic career, being a rank-and-file member and board member for many years before becoming the President of the Association for the 2009 term. He also serves as the senior associate editor of the Southern Economic Journal since 2012. In 2013, he was appointed as an associate editor of The Independent Review and as the research director of The Independent Institute.

== Work ==
Shughart has authored 10 books. He has contributed chapters to 65 books and has published over 140 peer-reviewed journal articles. He has written columns in outlets such as Wall Street Journal, Los Angeles Times, Philadelphia Inquirer, Pittsburgh Post-Gazette, Detroit News, San Francisco Chronicle, Washington Times, Fortune, Business Week, Investor's Business Daily, and National Post. Shughart was a long-term collaborator with Robert Tollison (1942–2016), with whom he published over 60 articles.

Much of Shughart's work has been focused on industrial organization, also the subject of his first textbook, The Organization of Industry, published in 1990. Aside from industrial organization, much of his work in the 1980s and 1990s was focused on tax policy, education reform and college sports. His second book, Antitrust Policy and Interest-Group Politics, was also published in 1990.

In 1997, Shughart edited the book Taxing Choice: The Predatory Politics of Fiscal Discrimination. He co-authored the 1998 book The Political Economy of the New Deal with Jim Couch, one of his University of Mississippi doctoral students.

In the late 2000s, energy policy also become a recurring topic in his research.

== Awards and honors ==
- 1998 – Sir Antony Fisher International Memorial Award, Atlas Economic Research Foundation.
- 1998 – Named as a Frederick A. P. Barnard Distinguished Professor by The University of Mississippi.
- 1988 – P.M.B. Self, William King Self and Henry C. Self Free Enterprise Chair at The University of Mississippi
- 1991 – Recognized for research on public transit policy by State of Mississippi Senate Concurrent Resolution No. 570, enacted March 1991.
- 1999 – Recipient of the 1999 Business Week Award, presented by the Economic Faculty Association of Rotterdam, Erasmus University, The Netherlands.
- 2003 – Distinguished Lecturer in Law and Economics, George Mason University Law School
- 2011 – J. Fish Smith Professor in Public Choice Utah State University, 2011 to present.
- 2023 - Named to the first cohort of Distinguished Fellows of the Southern Economic Association.

== Books ==
- The Organization of Industry (1990)
- Antitrust Policy and Interest-Group Politics (1990)
- Modern Managerial Economics: Economic Theory for Business Decisions, with William F. Chappell and Rex L. Cottle (1994)
- The Causes and Consequences of Antitrust: The Public-Choice Perspective, ed. with Fred S. McChesney (1995)
- Taxing Choice: The Predatory Politics of Fiscal Discrimination (1997)
- The Organization of Industry, 2nd ed. (1997)
- The Political Economy of the New Deal, with Jim F. Couch (1998)
- The Elgar Companion to Public Choice, ed. with Laura Razzolini (2001)
- The Economics of Budget Deficits, ed. with Charles K. Rowley and Robert D. Tollison (2002)
- Policy Challenges and Political Responses: Public Choice Perspectives on the Post-9/11 World, ed. with Robert D. Tollison (2005)
- The Elgar Companion to Public Choice, Second Edition, ed. with Michael Reksulak and Laura Razzolini (2013)
- The Oxford Handbook of Managerial Economics, ed. with Christopher Thomas (2013)

== Selected papers ==
- Preliminary evidence on the use of inputs by the Federal Reserve System (with Robert D. Tollison). American Economic Review (1983)
- The random character of merger activity (with Robert D. Tollison). RAND Journal of Economics (1984)
- Adam Smith in the customhouse (with Gary M. Anderson and Robert D. Tollison), Journal of Political Economy (1985)
- Free entry and efficient rent seeking: efficient rents 2 (with Richard S. Higgins and Robert D. Tollison). Public Choice (1985)
- On the incentives of judges to enforce legislative wealth transfers (with Gary M. Anderson and Robert D. Tollison). The Journal of Law and Economics (1989)
- Private school enrollment and public school performance (with Jim F. Couch and Al L. Williams). Public Choice (1993)
- Antitrust policy in Chicago and Virginia, Kansas Journal of Law and Public Policy (1995)
- Batter up! Moral hazard and the effects of the designated hitter rule on hit batsmen (with Brian L. Goff and Robert D. Tollison). Economic Inquiry (1997)
- The political economy of the IRS (with Marilyn Young and Michael Reksulak). Economics and Politics (2001)
- On the third law of demand (with Laura Razzolini and Robert D. Tollison). Economic Inquiry (2003)
- Bending before the storm: the U.S. Supreme Court in economic crisis, 1935–1937. Independent Review (2004)
- An analytical history of terrorism, 1945–2000. Public Choice (2006)
- Katrinanomics: The politics and economics of disaster relief. Public Choice (2006)
- On ethnic conflict and the origins of transnational terrorism (with Atin Basuchoudhary). Defence and Peace Economics (2010)
- Antitrust agonistes, Journal of Law, Economics & Policy (2022)
