= Joshua D. Wright =

American economist

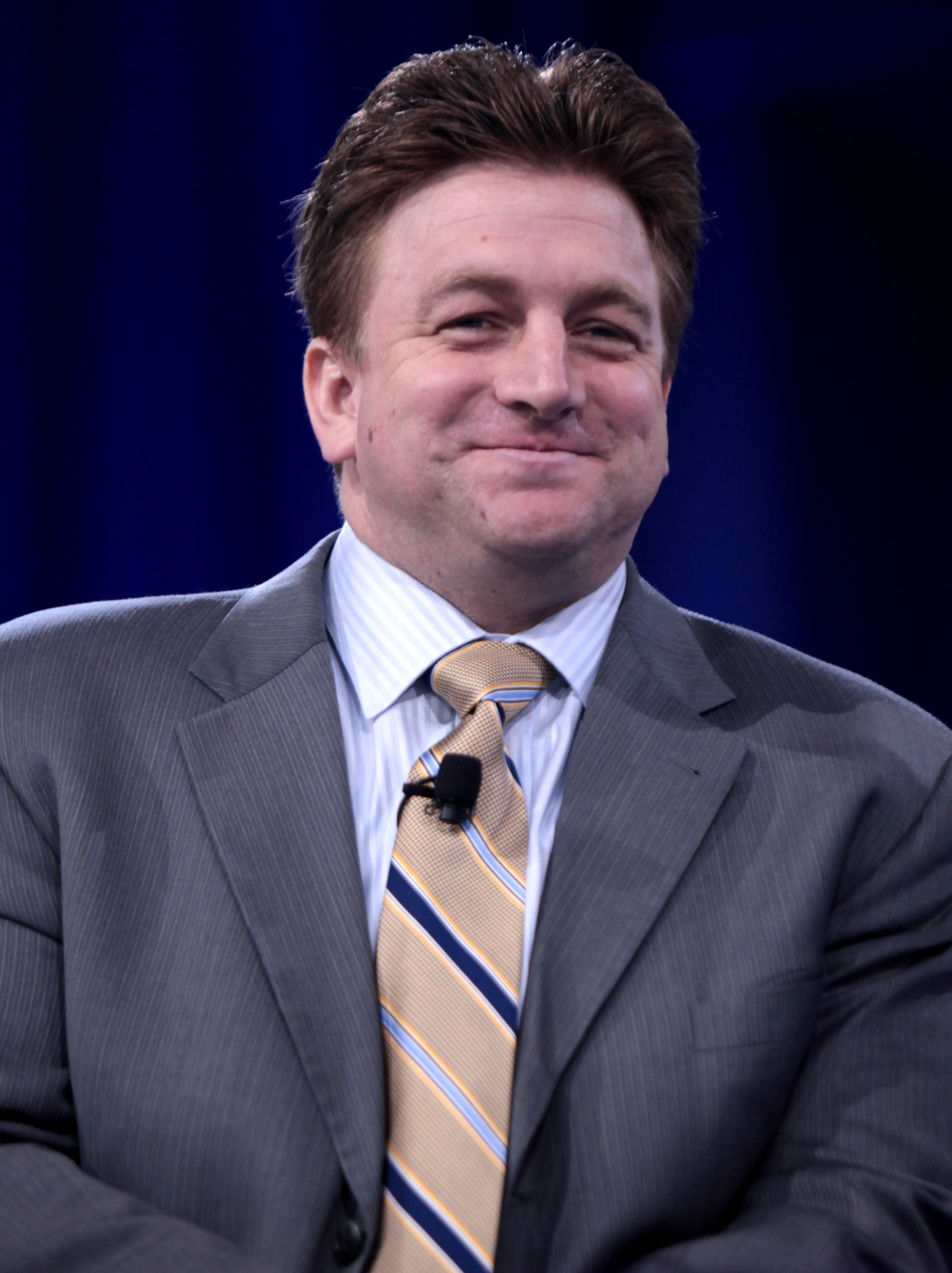

Commissioner of the Federal Trade Commission
- In office January 2013 – August 2015
- President: Barack Obama
- Preceded by: J. Thomas Rosch
- Succeeded by: Rohit Chopra

Personal details
- Born: January 20, 1977 (age 49) San Diego, California, U.S.
- Party: Republican
- Education: University of California, San Diego (BA); University of California, Los Angeles (JD, PhD)
- Awards: Bator Award (2014)

Joshua Daniel Wright (born January 20, 1977) is an American economist, attorney, and former government official. Wright was a commissioner of the Federal Trade Commission (FTC) from 2013 to 2015. At the time of his nomination, Wright was the fourth economist to be an FTC commissioner. Wright was a professor of law at George Mason University's Antonin Scalia Law School between 2004 and 2023, and was the executive director of its Global Antitrust Institute (GAI). In 2023, Wright resigned from George Mason following eight allegations of sexual misconduct from former students, and a determination by George Mason University that he violated university policies relating to consensual relationships and professional ethics that constituted grounds for termination.

While on the FTC, Wright advocated a laissez-faire approach to antitrust enforcement. After leaving the commission, the FTC inspector general found that Wright violated federal conflict of interest laws by representing Qualcomm and lobbying the FTC to drop a lawsuit it was pursuing against the company. While working as a law professor, Wright led the Global Antitrust Institute, which received significant funding from companies including Google, Apple, and Meta Platforms.The Wall Street Journal reported that Wright's clients ended their relationship with him in 2023 following a series of sexual misconduct allegations.

As a scholar, Wright's work has focused on the fields of antitrust law, law and economics, and consumer protection. In 2013, Wright was described by the National Review to be "widely considered his generation's greatest mind on antitrust law." He has published more than 100 articles and book chapters, co-authored a casebook, and edited several book volumes in these fields. Wright has served as co-editor of the Supreme Court Economic Review and senior editor of the Antitrust Law Journal, and in 2014 received the Paul M. Bator Award.

== Early life and education ==
Wright was born and raised in San Diego, California. After graduating from Patrick Henry High School in 1995, Wright studied economics at the University of California, San Diego, graduating in 1998 with a Bachelor of Arts, with honors. He then went to the University of California, Los Angeles (UCLA), where he jointly did doctoral study in economics and attended the UCLA School of Law. As a law student, Wright was a managing editor of the UCLA Law Review. He received a J.D. in 2002 and a Ph.D. in economics in 2003.

== Career ==
Wright was a law clerk for Judge James V. Selna of the U.S. District Court for the Central District of California from 2003 to 2004. He then joined the faculty of the George Mason University Law School (now Antonin Scalia Law School).

=== Federal Trade Commission (FTC) ===
Wright served in the Federal Trade Commission (FTC) in the Bureau of Competition as its inaugural Scholar-in-Residence from 2007 to 2008, where he focused on enforcement matters and competition policy.

In January 2013, President Barack Obama appointed Wright to serve as a commissioner of the FTC at the recommendation of Mitch McConnell. At the time, his appointment was scrutinized because of a pending FTC case against Google. Wright's research had been indirectly funded by Google, and he previously criticized the FTC's probe into Google. He agreed to recuse himself on any FTC matters involving Google for two years. He was ultimately unanimously confirmed by the U.S. Senate.

During his FTC tenure, Wright prolifically sided against attempts to regulate Big Tech. Wright resigned August 2015 to return to academia.

=== Academic and consulting work ===
As of October 2020, Wright's clientele as a consultant included Big Tech companies Google, Amazon, and Facebook, as well as Walmart, Qualcomm, and law firm Kirkland & Ellis. The Wall Street Journal reported that the companies dropped Wright as a client following allegations in 2023 that Wright engaged in affairs with law students.

In 2020, The New York Times described the Global Antitrust Institute (GAI), which was led by Wright, as working on behalf of Big Tech companies looking to evade antitrust scrutiny. The article noted that the "institute's leaders, including Joshua Wright, who has longstanding ties to Google, have worked closely with tech companies to fend off antitrust criticism".

In 2023, Wright was given a six-month contract with Google worth $430,000 to oppose efforts by the Biden administration and congressional lawmakers to remove YouTube and other tech platforms' liability protections. Wright was contracted to publish opinion articles and academic works in opposition to removing liability protections.

=== Other activities ===
Following the 2016 presidential election, Wright was appointed to serve on Donald Trump's presidential transition team, where he oversaw matters pertaining to the FTC. He was considered for the position of United States Assistant Attorney General for the Department of Justice Antitrust Division.

== Conflict-of-interest accusations ==
=== Qualcomm controversy ===
In June 2024, The Wall Street Journal reported that the office of the inspector general of the FTC had opened an investigation in 2017 into whether Wright had violated a federal conflict-of-interest law by representing Qualcomm and lobbying the FTC to drop a lawsuit it was then pursuing against Qualcomm, with the FTC inspector general's office concluding that Wright had violated federal law and recommending that he be prosecuted, although the Department of Justice declined to pursue the case.

=== Academic conflict of interest concerns ===
The Wall Street Journal reported that, as an academic, "Wright used research papers, blogs and his legal expertise to defend U.S. tech corporations from federal antitrust regulators". The report noted that, during his time as head of the Global Antitrust Institute (GAI), the institute received a $1 million donation from both Google and Amazon, with Qualcomm donating $2.9 million and Facebook (now Meta Platforms) donating $675,000.

As a result of the use of funds for hosting officials at vacation destinations, several members of the George Mason faculty expressed concerns that the companies' donations were a means of unlawfully lobbying foreign government officials. Such a practice would be in violation of the Foreign Corrupt Practices Act (FCPA). Additionally, several faculty members believed that university administrators violated the school's gift-acceptance policy by failing to review corporate donations for potential conflicts of interest.

== Allegations of sexual harassment ==
Wright resigned from his position at law school in August 2023 after eight women accused him of sexual misconduct. He faced allegations that he abused his position as a professor and manager to pressure current and former students and employees into sexual relationships. The Wall Street Journal reported that Wright's affairs with his students began as early as 2006. Following the completion of an investigation by an outside investigator, George Mason University determined in March 2023 that Wright violated university policies around consensual relationships and professional ethics, which constituted grounds for termination.

Wright began directing faculty hiring for the law school at George Mason in 2015. Bloomberg News reported that Wright's accusers alleged that he "used his positions and influence to proposition female students, staffers and job applicants," with several accusers stating that they feared professional retaliation if they didn't comply. Wright also worked as an attorney at Wilson Sonsini, between 2016 and 2019, where he left amid a 2019 investigation into a sexual relationship with a subordinate woman, Lindsey Edwards, who was also a research assistant to Wright at GMU and an intern to Wright at the FTC.

Two former students of Wright's, Elyse Dorsey and Angela Landry, accused Wright of trying to silence them and stated that he pressured them into sexual relationships during their time as students and after graduating. In 2021, Wright arranged for Dorsey to have an economics fellowship at the University of Virginia with living expenses and tuition funded by Google, Amazon, and Facebook. Dorsey stated in her Title IX complaint that she believed Wright blocked promised funding for the program in retaliation after their relationship ended.

Wright denied coercion and said that the relationships were consensual and sued two of the women for defamation. Google terminated its relationship with Wright as a consultant after allegations publicly surfaced in 2023.

=== Response from companies ===
The Wall Street Journal reported that, for a year after being informed of sexual misconduct allegations facing Wright by a university investigator in 2022, Google and Meta continued to contract Wright as a consultant for the companies. Amazon stopped working with Wright after finding out that Wright, who served as the company's lawyer, asked Amazon for money for Dorsey without disclosing his relationship to her, citing violations of the company's ethics policies. In deposition testimony, Kirkland & Ellis reported that the firm stopped working with Wright because the case he was on ended, and that the firm had no intention of working with Wright in the future after reading Wright's defamation complaint.

Wright continued to have a professional relationship with Wilson Sonsini after leaving the firm following the investigation. Susan Creighton, who led the firm's office in Washington, D.C., urged Wright to continue working for the firm on Google's behalf, suggesting in an email that he "continue to bill through the firm, effectively as an 'expert,' and keep 100% of the revenues".

=== Title IX suit and defamation lawsuit against accusers ===
Wright filed a $108 million defamation lawsuit against two of his accusers in August 2023. Owing to lost income, Wright urged the court to relieve him from his requirement to pay $35,000 in monthly spousal and child support payments. Wright's wife filed a legal response arguing that Wright was at fault for the loss of income stemming from his former clients terminating their relationship with him. The defamation lawsuits were dismissed without prejudice on December 1, 2023. However, the judge in the case allowed the lawsuit to proceed to trial after Wright amended the initial suit.

During the defamation litigation, Wright admitted to sexual relationships with at least seven female GMU Law students over a period of more than 15 years. In March 2025, Wright dropped the defamation case, settling with Dorsey and non-suiting the case against Landry. Wright said he was "fully vindicated" and would "not hesitate to take further action if necessary to hold accountable those responsible for false accusations." Dorsey described the defamation matter as "19 months of retaliatory litigation," and noted that the settlement funds came exclusively from insurance and constituted less than 0.3% of Wright's alleged $108 million in damages. Dorsey further stated she was "motivated to speak out because it became clear to me that Wright was repeatedly using his power as a professor to facilitate improper sexual interactions with numerous students not just me," and the "idea that other women would also feel like their career opportunities were tied to sexual interactions with Professor Wright--whether welcome or not--is never acceptable."

Landry moved for sanctions against Wright after he dropped the lawsuit one business day before a 3-week trial was set to start, and the court scheduled a 2-day evidentiary hearing. Landry's motion noted Wright's "eye-popping" $108 million damages claim was "more than double the amount Johnny Depp sought when making defamation claims related to multi-billion dollar movie franchises," and quoted Wright as saying he might file "defamation for fun but not to win," that he intended to "Raise the cost," "Break her" and potentially "bankrupt" her, referred to defendants as "bitches," and agreed he would like to "make their lives hell." Wright responded that he never instructed attorneys to drive up the costs of litigation and that he "filed the lawsuit because lies were told about me that did immense damage." The evidentiary hearing was held March 24–25, 2025, following which the judge ordered post-hearing briefing due April 25, 2025.

In December 2023, Wright filed a Title IX lawsuit against George Mason University. In the lawsuit, Wright claimed that GMU engaged in sex discrimination against him, alleging that university leadership prematurely stood with his accusers because they are women. In a September 2024 decision, the Eastern District of Virginia denied Wright's motion for a preliminary injunction to stop GMU's Title IX investigation, and granted in part and denied in part GMU's motion to dismiss Wright's claims. Wright dropped his lawsuit against GMU in December 2024.

== Personal life and recognition ==
Wright lived in McLean, Virginia with his wife and three children. As of 2024, Wright is currently engaged to Edwards, a former student who was also an intern for him during his FTC tenure, and who had previously called him a "predator."

=== Work and recognition ===
In 2013, Wright was praised by the National Review for his expertise on antitrust matters, and was described as being "widely considered his generation's greatest mind on antitrust law." In 2014, Wright received the Paul M. Bator Award by the Federalist Society at the society's 33rd annual symposium. As an academic, Wright published over one hundred articles and book chapters.

He was also co-editor of the Supreme Court Economic Review, a journal that applied scholarship to assess decisions by the United States Supreme Court. He was also senior editor of the Antitrust Law Journal, an academic journal published by the American Bar Association Antitrust Law Section

== See also ==
- List of former FTC commissioners
- Weinstein effect
