= National Security Law Journal =

- Discipline: Law
- Language: English
- Edited by: Hala Shabaneh, Editor-In-Chief; Keagan Pendergrass, Executive Editor; Selena Kuhlman, Managing Editor

Publication details
- History: 2013-present
- Publisher: Antonin Scalia Law School (United States)
- Frequency: Biannually
- Open access: Yes

Standard abbreviations
- ISO 4: Natl. Secur. Law J.

Indexing
- ISSN: 2373-8464
- LCCN: 2014202997
- OCLC no.: 883081388

Links
- Journal homepage; Online archive

The National Security Law Journal is a biannual student-edited law journal at George Mason University's Antonin Scalia Law School. The journal covers the field of national security law, including legal issues related to diplomacy, intelligence, homeland security, and the military. NSLJ serves as a forum for thought-provoking scholarly articles written by leading academics and experienced practitioners on current legal developments. The articles selected for publication each year promote a greater understanding of national security laws and precedent, serve as a catalyst for legal change and development, and provide a source of legal authority and analysis to the legal community. The first issue was released in March 2013.

The journal accepts manuscripts throughout the year on its Scholastica website. Each publication issue features three to five pieces, including two to three “professional pieces” written by professors, judges, attorneys, or other practitioners, along with two or three student Notes or Comments.

The journal was cited widely in national and international media in the summer of 2015 for publishing an article that shed light on controversial views held by a professor then teaching at the U.S. Military Academy.

The National Security Law Journal also holds at least one symposium each year that highlights and examines emerging issues in national security law. Previous symposium topics have included digital currency, election security, Russia-Ukraine crisis, sanctions, and drone surveillance.

== Events ==
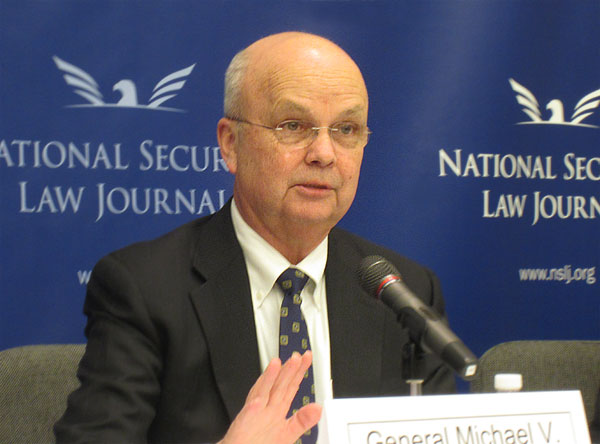
General (Ret.) Michael Hayden, former director of the National Security Agency and Central Intelligence Agency, speaks at a National Security Law Journal symposium on cybersecurity in Washington, D.C. in April 2013

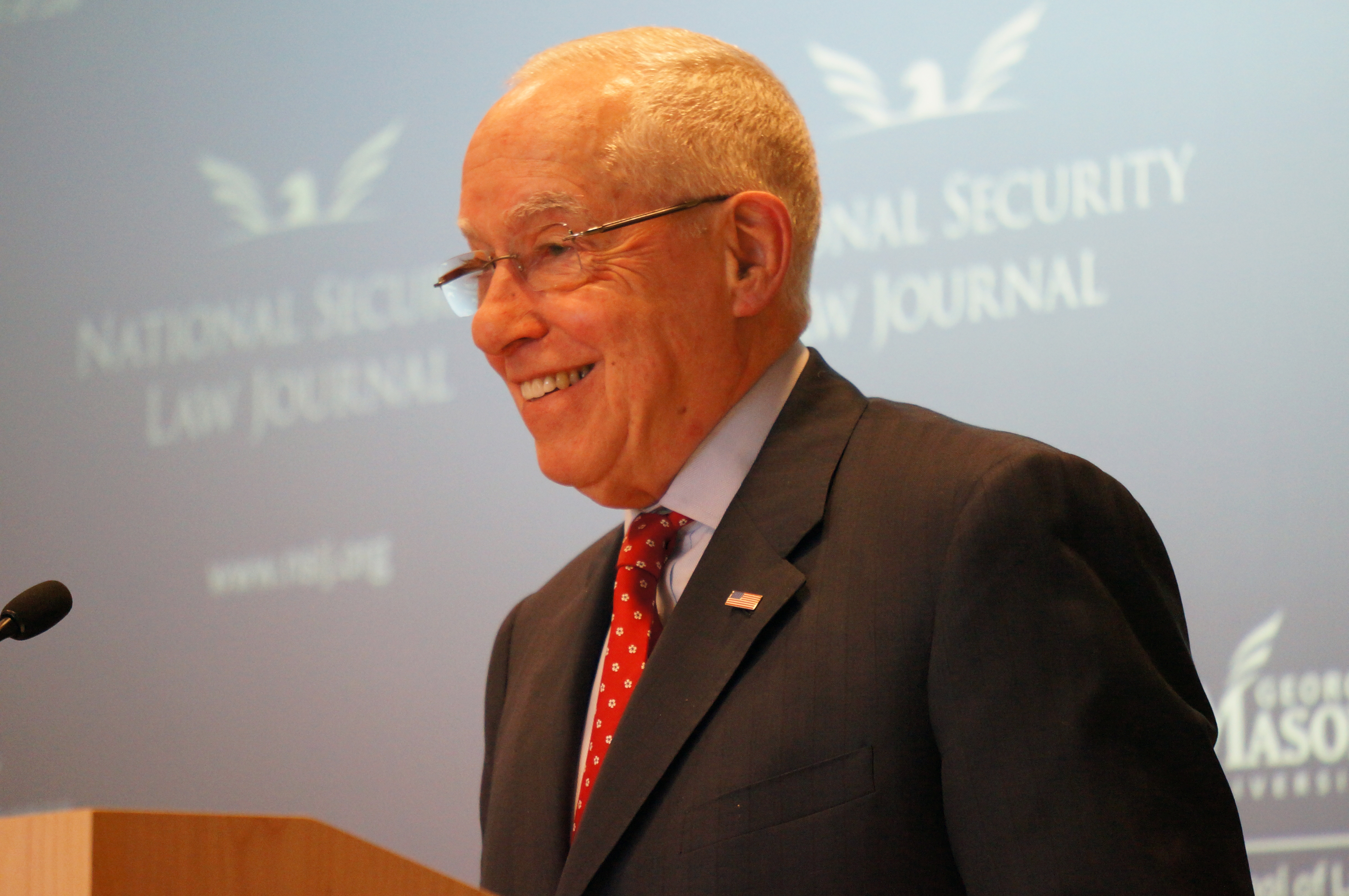
Former U.S. Attorney General Michael Mukasey speaks at a National Security Law Journal event in Arlington County, Virginia in March 2014

On April 2, 2013, the journal hosted a symposium on cybersecurity with Michael V. Hayden, former director of the National Security Agency and Central Intelligence Agency; Suzanne E. Spaulding, Deputy Under Secretary for the National Protection and Programs Directorate at the U.S. Department of Homeland Security; and Ronald D. Lee, partner at Arnold & Porter and former General Counsel, National Security Agency.

On November 6, 2013, the journal hosted "Drone Wars", a panel discussion on the legal framework for the use of drones under the law of armed conflict, featuring panelists from The Heritage Foundation, The New York Times, BBC News, and George Mason University. The following week, on November 12, 2013, the journal hosted "Blinking Red: Crisis and Compromise in American Intelligence After 9/11", a discussion with author and former Congressional staffer Michael Allen on his new book on intelligence reform.

On March 26, 2014, the journal hosted an event with former U.S. Attorney General Michael Mukasey, who spoke on the NSA, wiretapping, and PRISM.

During the fall of 2020, the journal's symposium was titled "Running Interference: Protecting the Integrity of American Elections." The two virtual panels featured speakers such as The Honorable Susan M. Gordon, Nikolas Guggenberger, Prof. Josephine Wolff, and Jamil N. Jaffer. The events were held in conjunction with the National Security Institute founded by Jamil Jaffer.

In February 2022, the journal hosted its 10th anniversary symposium series with four panels of speakers speaking on topics such as the future of U.S. Export Controls and the Impact on International Trade, as well as the future of OFAC Sanctions and International Trade.

== Impact ==
The journal attracted international media attention in the summer of 2015 when it published an article by William C. Bradford. The article, titled Trahison des Professeurs, argues that law professors who criticize the war on terror are operating as an Islamist Fifth Column and should therefore be treated as “targetable” unlawful enemy combatants. The article was published in part to shed light on these controversial views and to invite responses from other academics.

The journal’s new editorial board soon repudiated the article and posted a highly critical response authored by George Mason University law professor Jeremy A. Rabkin. Bradford defended his views but resigned from his teaching position at the U.S. Military Academy. The controversy was covered by The Washington Post, The Guardian, The Atlantic, Fox News, and other media. and the Associated Press.

The National Security Law Journal has also previously been cited in newspapers such as Roll Call.
