= Nicholas Economides =

American economist

Nicholas Economides is a Professor of Economics at the NYU Stern School of Business. He is also Executive Director and Founder of the NET Institute. He has previously taught at Stanford University, the University of California at Berkeley, and Columbia University. He is an internationally recognized academic authority on antitrust, network economics, and public policy.

He conducts research in antitrust and public policy, the economics of platforms and networks, interoperability and standardization, the structure and organization of financial markets and payment systems, privacy in platforms, and strategic analysis of markets and mergers.

He has advised or is currently advising the US Federal Trade Commission, the governments of Canada, Greece, Ireland, New Zealand, and Portugal, the Attorneys General of New York and Texas, telecommunications and high technology companies, Federal Reserve Banks, the Bank of Greece, and Financial Exchanges.

He is an editor of the Journal of Competition Law and Economics, the Journal of Economics and Management Strategy, and the Social Sciences Research Network.
