= J. Thomas Rosch =

American government official (1939–2016)

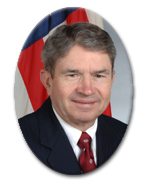

Commissioner of Federal Trade Commission
- In office January 5, 2006 – January 11, 2013
- President: George W. Bush; Barack Obama
- Preceded by: William Kovacic
- Succeeded by: Joshua D. Wright

Personal details
- Born: John Thomas Rosch; October 4, 1939 Council Bluffs, Iowa, U.S.
- Died: March 30, 2016 (aged 76) Lake Forest, Illinois, U.S.
- Party: Republican
- Spouse(s): Carolyn Lee (Kitzi) Rosch, (two children, 4 grandchildren)
- Education: Harvard College (BA); Jesus College, Cambridge; Harvard Law School (LLB)
- Profession: Lawyer

John Thomas Rosch (October 4, 1939 – March 30, 2016) was an American lawyer and former Commissioner of the United States Federal Trade Commission.

Rosch joined the FTC from the San Francisco office of Latham & Watkins, where he was the former managing partner and most recently a partner, working in the firm's antitrust and trade practices group. Rosch served as chair of the American Bar Association’s Antitrust Section in 1990, and he has chaired the State Bar of California’s Antitrust Section. He served as the FTC's Bureau of Consumer Protection director from 1973 to 1975, and in 1989 was a member of the Special Committee to Study the Role of the FTC.

Nationally regarded for his antitrust and trade regulation law expertise, and as a Fellow of the American College of Trial Lawyers for more than 20 years, he has been lead counsel in more than 100 federal and state court antitrust cases and has more than 40 years experience before the Bar. In 2003, Rosch was honored as Antitrust Lawyer of the Year by the California State Bar Antitrust Section. He obtained his LLB from Harvard University in 1965.

Rosch died on March 30, 2016, at the age of 76. Rosch was married with two children and four grandchildren.

== See also ==
- List of former FTC commissioners
