= Supreme Court Economic Review =

- Discipline: Law and economics
- Language: English

Publication details
- History: 1975-2020
- Publisher: University of Chicago Press for the Antonin Scalia Law School, George Mason University (US)
- Frequency: quarterly
- Impact factor: 0.37 (2017)

Standard abbreviations
- ISO 4: Supreme Court Econ. Rev.

Indexing
- ISSN: 0736-9921

Links
- Journal homepage

The Supreme Court Economic Review was an academic journal published by the University of Chicago Press. The journal applied economic and legal scholarship to the work of the United States Supreme Court. Articles considered the implicit or explicit economic reasoning employed by the Court to reach its decisions, and explained the economic consequences of the Court's decisions. SCER was published in conjunction with the Law and Economics Center at the George Mason University School of Law. It was established in 1975 and ceased publication in 2020.
