= USCGC Penobscot Bay =

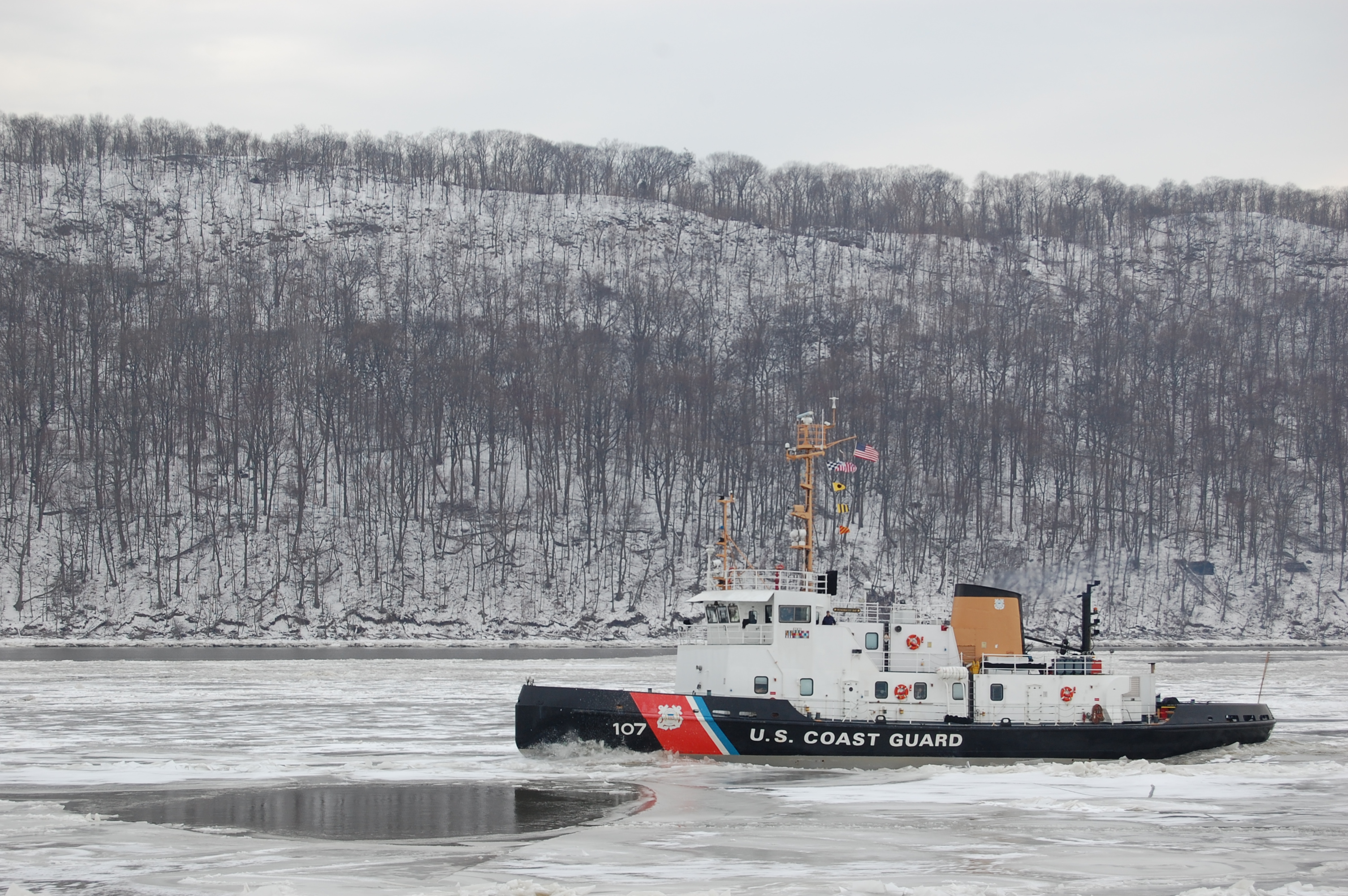
- USCGC Penobscot Bay (WTGB 107)

History

United States
- Builder: Bay City Marine Incorporated
- Laid down: July 1, 1983
- Launched: July 30, 1984
- Commissioned: January 4, 1985
- Home port: Bayonne, NJ
- Identification: IMO number: 8635186; MMSI number: 366999982; Callsign: NIGY
- Motto: "Performance, Prowess, Pride"
- Status: Active

General characteristics
- Class & type: 140' Bay-class Icebreaking Tug (WTGB)
- Type: Icebreaker
- Displacement: 690 tons
- Length: 140 ft
- Beam: 37.5 ft
- Draft: 12.5
- Ice class: 30 inch continuous, 6 feet back/ramming
- Installed power: Diesel Electric
- Propulsion: Two Fairbanks-Morse diesel engines
- Speed: 14.7 knots (27 km/h) max
- Crew: 17

USCGC Penobscot Bay (WTGB 107) is the seventh of nine United States Coast Guard 140-foot Bay-class icebreaking tugs. Homeported in Bayonne, New Jersey, the primary missions of Penobscot Bay and her crew are Domestic Icebreaking and Ports, Waterways, & Coastal Security. During the winter months, Penobscot Bay is responsible for providing search and rescue capabilities to the ice-covered areas in New York City and the Hudson Valley, as well as throughout coastal New England. The cutter also facilitates the safe navigation of commercial product, including gasoline and heating oil, through the ice-choked Hudson River from New York City to Albany. All Bay-class cutters, including Penobscot Bay, use a low-pressure-air hull lubrication or bubbler system that forces air and water between the hull and ice. This system improves icebreaking capabilities by reducing resistance against the hull, reducing horsepower requirements.

In addition to ice breaking, Penobscot Bay is heavily involved in providing waterside security for the port of New York/New Jersey, the busiest port on the East Coast. Penobscot Bay is also responsible for monitoring vessel traffic, enforcing boating regulations for recreational and commercial vessels, and acting as lead security for high-profile events in the port.

Penobscot Bay is crewed by 17 personnel, consisting of 14 enlisted members and 3 officers. She was built by Bay City Marine in Tacoma, WA, keel was laid on 1 July 1983, launched on 30 July 1984, and commissioned on 4 January 1985. Her overall length is 140 feet with a beam of 37 feet, displacing 662 tons.
