= Shugart =

Shugart is surname, which may refer to:

== People ==
- Alan Shugart (1930–2006), American engineer, business executive, and founder of Shugart Associates
- Chase Shugart (born 1996), American baseball player
- Clyde Shugart (1916–2009), American gridiron football player
- Frank Shugart (1866–1944), American baseball player
- Ian Shugart (1957–2023), Canadian politician, professor, and public servant
- Kenneth Shugart (1925–1985), American naval officer and All-American college basketball player
- Matthew Søberg Shugart (born c. 1960), American political scientist and orchardist
- Rita Shugart, American bridge player; second wife of Alan Shugart

== Technology ==
- Shugart Associates, a defunct computer peripheral manufacturer
- Shugart Associates System Interface, a type of interface between computers and storage devices
- Shugart bus, a type of floppy disk drive interface
- Shugart Technology, former name of Seagate Technology, a data storage company

== See also ==
- Shughart (disambiguation)
