= Josh Blackman =

American lawyer and law professor

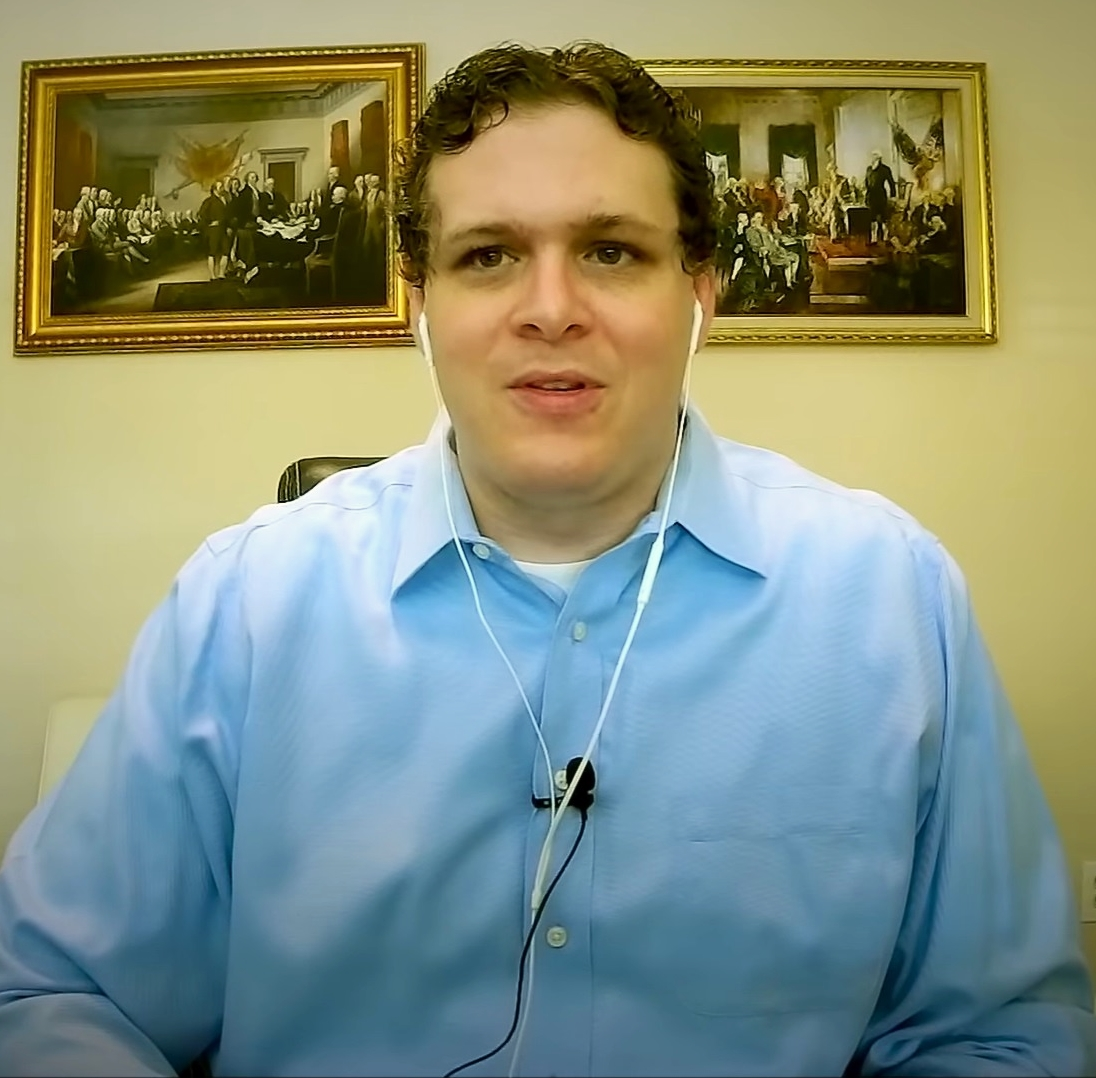
- Blackman in 2012
- Born: Joshua Michael Blackman

Academic background
- Education: Pennsylvania State University (BS); George Mason University (JD)

Academic work
- Discipline: Constitutional Law
- Institutions: South Texas College of Law Houston; Cato Institute
- Website: Personal Website, South Texas College of Law Biography

Joshua Michael Blackman is an American lawyer. He is a professor at South Texas College of Law Houston, where he serves as the Centennial Chair of Constitutional Law. He focuses on constitutional law and the intersection of law and technology. He has authored one book and co-authored two others.

== Life and career ==
Blackman attended Pennsylvania State University, and graduated in 2005 with a BS in information sciences and technology. He then attended George Mason Law School, (now the Antonin Scalia Law School), graduating with a JD in 2009. After finishing law school, Blackman clerked for judge Kim R. Gibson in Johnstown, Pennsylvania, and subsequently for Judge Danny Julian Boggs.

In 2009 he launched (via his nonprofit, the Harlan Institute) FantasySCOTUS, a United States Supreme Court prediction market. In 2010, his personal blog was identified as a top 100 law blog by the American Bar Association, which took note of his claim to have co-developed an algorithm to predict the outcome of Supreme Court cases.

Blackman joined the South Texas College of Law in 2012 as an assistant professor, and was promoted through the ranks, becoming a full professor in 2018 and the Centennial Chair of Constitutional Law in 2023. He teaches property, constitutional law, and legal theory. He has appeared as a speaker for the Federalist Society, and is an adjunct scholar at the Cato Institute.

Blackman is listed as a contributor to the Heritage Foundation's Project 2025 policy document. In 2025, he publicly accused the Heritage Foundation of fueling antisemitism and stopped working with the organization.

== Court cases ==
In 2015, Blackman represented Defense Distributed in their First Amendment challenge to the International Traffic in Arms Regulations ban on 3D printed gun files. The lawsuit was settled in 2018.

== CUNY incident ==
On March 29, 2018, at a Federalist Society event hosted by CUNY Law School, Blackman's presentation was disrupted by campus protesters. Blackman later shared a video of the incident, in which he was heckled and shouted down for approximately ten minutes before the protestors left the room. Some of the protestors objected to Blackman's support for President Trump's decision to end the Deferred Action for Childhood Arrivals (DACA) program, although Blackman explained that he would support a DACA law that was passed by Congress.

== Books ==
- Blackman, Josh, and Randy Barnett. Unprecedented: The Constitutional Challenge to Obamacare. PublicAffairs, 2013. ISBN 978-1610393287
- Blackman, Josh. Unraveled: Obamacare, Religious Liberty, and Executive Power. Cambridge University Press, 2016. ISBN 978-1107169012
- Barnett, Randy E., and Josh Blackman. An Introduction to Constitutional Law: 100 Supreme Court Cases Everyone Should Know. Wolters Kluwer, 2020. ISBN 978-1543813906
