= Luke Nichols =

American YouTuber (born 1978)

- Born: Luke Joseph Nichols; October 3, 1978 (age 48); Anchorage, Alaska, U.S.
- Education: Brigham Young University (B.S.); George Mason University (J.D.)
- Spouse: Rebecca Nichols
- Children: 3

YouTube information
- Channels: outdoorboys; catsandcarp; NicholsGreen
- Years active: 2013–2025
- Genres: outdoor recreation; outdoor cooking; vlog; family; camping; survival; bushcraft; fishing
- Subscribers: 20.9 million (Outdoor Boys); 1.27 million (Catfish and Carp)
- Views: 3.7 billion (Outdoor Boys); 322 million (Catfish and Carp)
- Last updated: August 22, 2026

Luke Joseph Nichols (born October 3, 1978) is an American attorney and YouTuber best known for the channel Outdoor Boys, where he primarily produced content on backcountry camping, bushcraft, survival, and outdoor cooking. He launched the Outdoor Boys YouTube channel in May 2015, and as of Nov 2026, the channel has more than 20 million subscribers. However on May 17, 2025, announced by a 4:46 minute video titled "Goodbye", Luke J. Nichols retired from his main YouTube channel, Outdoor Boys, due to his concerns.

Since December 1, 2025, Nichols has served on the Young Men General Advisory Council for the Church of Jesus Christ of Latter-day Saints.

== Early life and education ==
Luke Nichols was born and raised in Anchorage, Alaska on October 3, 1978 to Melvin and Sharon Nichols. Growing up in Alaska, Nichols developed a passion for the outdoors. When he was 19, Nichols traveled to Japan on a mission for the Church of Jesus Christ of Latter-Day Saints in Fukuoka and the surrounding area. He attended Brigham Young University (BYU), where he briefly studied engineering before studying and earning his bachelor's degree in political science in 2004.

After graduating from BYU, Nichols started a political consulting firm and ran 20 campaigns over three years. Nichols and his wife later moved to Virginia, where he attended law school at George Mason University and obtained his Juris Doctor in 2009. Later, Nichols started his own criminal defense practice, Nichols & Green, focusing on traffic laws.

== YouTube career ==
In 2013, Nichols started posting videos on his first channel, Catfish & Carp, which was first created to advertise their law firm based in northern Virginia before focusing on fishing and outdoors related content. In 2020, Nichols began to work on YouTube full time when his channels outpaced his law practice. Followers enjoy Nichols' content for its "simple and wholesome" nature. His emphasis on "outdoor activities, self-reliance, and family values" is said to resonate with viewers.

=== Retirement ===
In May 2025, Nichols announced via a video on his channel that he would be stepping back from YouTube, both due to privacy concerns and to spend more time with his family. In the span of the 18 months leading up to this video, Nichols gained 12 million followers. Nichols considered the resulting attention to be "overwhelming". Nichols stated that he may post a final round of videos at the end of the year. In November 2025, Nichols announced he would be posting three unfinished videos throughout the month. Nichols can still be seen on his son's youtube channel, Outdoor Tom, which is still actively posting videos similar to ones posted on the Outdoor Boys channel.

In November 2025, a guest video Nichols filmed was published on the YouTube channel MyLifeOutdoors, since the channel's regular host was on hiatus to care for a family member diagnosed with cancer.

=== Appeal to younger audiences ===
The Outdoor Boys channel attracted a broad audience across age groups, but became particularly noted for its appeal to younger viewers and families. Nichols' approach of featuring his sons Tommy, Nathan, and Jacob as active participants rather than passive observers in activities such as fishing, bushcraft, and wilderness survival modeled a form of hands-on, curiosity-driven outdoor education.

Reviewers noted that the channel's content functioned as informal outdoor education, with Nichols teaching practical skills such as fire-making, animal tracking, and wilderness navigation alongside his children. The family-centered format was described as encouraging viewers particularly children watching with parents to engage with nature rather than consume it passively.

=== Viral growth and cross-platform reach ===
In December 2023, a viral TikTok trend centered on Outdoor Boys content introduced the channel to a significantly younger demographic, driving a surge in subscribers and expanding its reach beyond its existing audience of outdoor enthusiasts. In the 18 months leading up to his May 2025 departure announcement, Nichols gained approximately 12 million subscribers, growth he described as "overwhelming."

The channel's cross-platform presence on YouTube, TikTok, and Reddit contributed to its characterization as one of the fastest growing outdoor channels on the platform during that period.

== Personal life ==
As of 2026, Nichols lives with his wife Rebecca and three sons Thomas, Nathan, and Jacob in Alaska after relocating from Virginia during the COVID-19 pandemic.

=== Religious service ===
In December 2025, Nichols was appointed to the Young Men General Advisory Council for the Church of Jesus Christ of Latter-day Saints.
