= Jeremy A. Rabkin =

American law professor

Jeremy A. Rabkin (born July 15, 1952) is a professor of law at the Antonin Scalia Law School at George Mason University, where he teaches constitutional law and international law. Prior to joining the George Mason faculty in 2007, he spent 27 years as a professor of government at Cornell University. He holds a Ph.D. in government from Harvard University and graduated summa cum laude with a B.A. from Cornell.

Rabkin has written numerous books, chapters, papers, articles, and essays. Known for excellence in teaching, in 1999 and 2001 he was awarded the title of "Cornell's Most Influential Teacher." Among his famous students include New York Times best-selling author Ann Coulter.

Rabkin is a board member of the United States Institute of Peace, the chairman of the Center for Individual Rights, and a member of the Council of Academic Advisers at the American Enterprise Institute. His interests include national security law and early constitutional history.

== See also ==
- Independent Women's Forum
- Loren Smith
- Stephen F. Williams
- United Nations Convention on the Law of the Sea
