= William W. Eldridge IV =

American judge

General District Court Judge for the 26th Judicial District of Virginia
- Preceded by: N. Randolph Bryant

William W. Eldridge IV is an Virginia Circuit Court Judge for the 26th Judicial District.

== Early life and education ==
Eldridge was raised in Orange County, California. He attended George Mason University School of Law, graduating in 2004 with a juris doctor. He passed the bar in 2004.

== Career ==
Eldridge was a partner at Eldridge & Nagy until 2015, working as a defense attorney. Eldridge worked on one federal and one state death penalty case. He also represented clients in civil litigation.

In June 2015, Eldridge was temporarily appointed as a General District Court for the 26th Judicial Circuit of Virginia, and was sworn in on July 8, 2015. He was later assigned to the Harrisonburg and Rockingham County General District Court. On May 1, 2020, Eldridge was elevated to the Circuit Court to begin an eight-year term there. Chris Collins replaced him in the General District Court.

== Personal life ==
Eldridge lives in Harrisonburg, Virginia.
