= Journal of Law, Economics, and Policy =

American law journal

Journal of Law, Economics & Policy
- Discipline: Law Review
- Language: English

Publication details
- History: 2004 – present
- Frequency: 2-4 issues per year

Standard abbreviations
- Bluebook: J.L. ECON & POL'Y
- ISO 4: Find out here

Indexing
- ISSN: 1553-4367

Links
- Journal homepage

The Journal of Law, Economics & Policy is an independent, peer-edited law journal run by students at the Antonin Scalia Law School of George Mason University. Founded in 2002, the journal covers the eponymous fields of law, economics, and policy. The journal usually publishes two to four issues per year, with one of those issues dedicated to annual symposia and one issue dedicated to student submissions. The journal accepts manuscripts throughout the year on its Scholastica website. The Journal is the first student-run journal of law and economics in legal academia.

The journal is cited widely throughout state and federal courts, including notably in an opinion by D.C. Circuit U.S. federal judge Neomi Rao in District of Columbia v. Exxon Mobil Corp. It also holds symposia regularly on relevant legal challenges.

== Membership ==
Like most American legal journals, candidate membership on the Journal is granted through a competitive process. First-year students must participate in a Write-On competition after completing their final exams in the spring semester. The Journal then considers the student's first-year grades, resume, and performance in the write on to make offers of membership. Full membership is granted upon finishing a comment and spading an article to be published.

== Most Cited Articles ==
- Eugene Volokh and Donald M. Falk, Google: First Amendment Protection for Search Engine Results, 8 J.L. Econ. & Pol'y 883 (2012)
- Henry E. Smith, Self-Help and the Nature of Property, 1 J.L. Econ. & Pol'y 69 (2005)
- Roger A. Fairfax, Jr., From "Overcriminalization" to "Smart on Crime": American Criminal Justice Reform Legacy and Prospects, 7 J.L. Econ. & Pol'y 597 (2011)
- Ernest A. Young, A General Defense of Erie Railroad Co. v. Tompkins, 10 J.L. Econ. & Pol'y 17 (2013)
- Darryl K. Brown, Criminal Law's Unfortunate Triumph Over Administrative Law, 7 J.L. Econ. & Pol'y 657 (2011)
- Nicholas J. Johnson, Self-Defense? 2 J.L. Econ. & Pol'y 187 (2006)
