= Journal of Competition Law & Economics =

The Journal of Competition Law & Economics (print: ISSN 1744-6414, online: ISSN 1744-6422) is a quarterly peer-reviewed law journal dedicated to competition law and economics, published by Oxford University Press. The journal was established in March 2004. The first issue was published in March 2005. The founding co-editors are J. Gregory Sidak (Criterion Economics), and Damien Geradin (Covington & Burling).

== See also ==
- List of law journals
