= Antonin Scalia Law School =

Law school of George Mason University

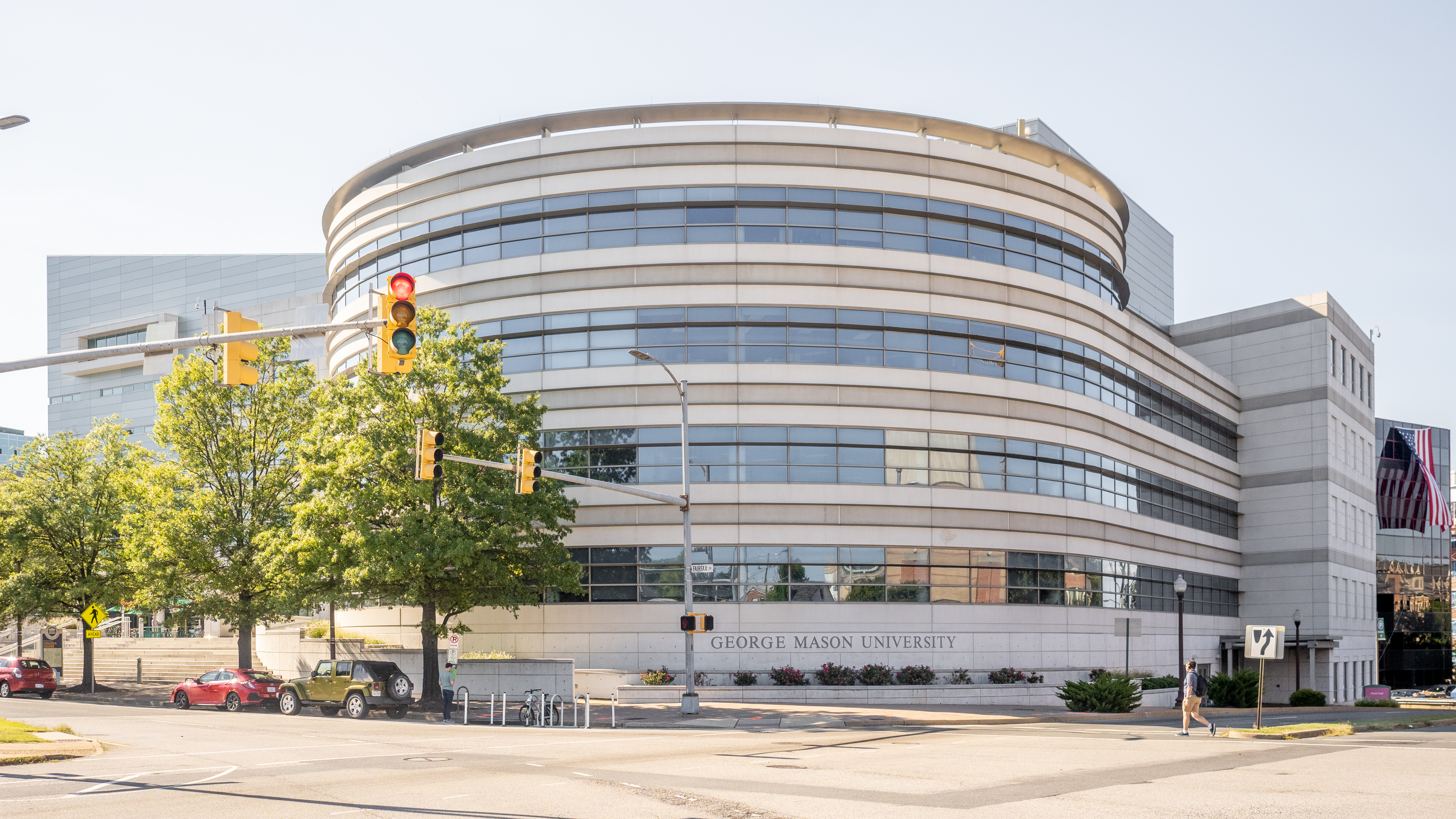
- Parent school: George Mason University
- Established: December 2, 1979; 46 years ago
- School type: Public law school
- Dean: Ken Randall
- Location: Arlington, Virginia, United States; 38°53′06″N 77°06′01″W
- Enrollment: 546 (2023)
- USNWR ranking: 31st (tie) (2025)
- Website: www.law.gmu.edu
- ABA profile: ABA Profile

The Antonin Scalia Law School is the law school of George Mason University, Virginia's largest public research university. It is located in Arlington, Virginia, near both Washington, D.C. and Mason University's main campus in Fairfax, Virginia. The school is accredited by the American Bar Association (ABA) and is known for its conservative ideological leaning in law and economics. It is named after former Supreme Court Justice Antonin Scalia.

== History ==
The Antonin Scalia Law School at George Mason University traces its origins to the International School of Law (ISL), which was established in 1972 and initially held classes in a classroom at the Federal Bar Building on Pennsylvania Avenue in Washington, D.C. In 1973, the school relocated to the former residence of United States Chief Justice Edward Douglass White on Rhode Island Avenue. Two years later, in 1975, it acquired the former Kann's Department Store building in Arlington, Virginia. Despite this expansion, ISL was unable to obtain accreditation. The Virginia General Assembly authorized a law school at George Mason University in March 1979, and the school was formally founded on July 1, 1979.

In 1976, ISL discussed a merger with George Mason University, which expressed interest in setting up a law school. In 1978, the Virginia State Council of Education denied GMU's proposal to start a law school and encouraged a merger with ISL instead. Later that year, the Council advised against allowing that merger, but the Virginia state legislature nonetheless approved the merger in early March 1979.

The law school became fully accredited by the American Bar Association in 1980. Since then, its ranking among U.S. law schools has risen rapidly, being ranked 31st in the United States in 2025, according to U.S. News & World Report.

In 2016, the school received $30 million to rename itself for Antonin Scalia, the late United States Supreme Court justice. The Charles Koch Foundation provided $10 million of the donation, with the remaining $20 million coming from an anonymous donor. On March 31, 2016, Mason's Board of Visitors approved the renaming. The initially approved name was announced as "Antonin Scalia School of Law", which quickly received attention when the public began to note the abbreviated title would spell out an almost profane acronym. To remedy the situation, school officials soon announced a new name: Antonin Scalia Law School, a decision ratified by the State Council of Higher Education for Virginia on May 17, 2016. In 2022, ProPublica reported that the anonymous donation made in 2016 was allegedly from Barre Seid, a businessman and philanthropist known for his donations to conservative causes.

In 2019, the law school received a gift of $50 million, the largest ever received by the university, from the estate of Allison and Dorothy Rouse to "fund a chair or chairs that will promote the conservative principles of governance, statesmanship, high morals, civil and religious freedom and the study of the United States Constitution".

== Admission and academics ==
For the Juris Doctor (J.D.) class entering in 2023, the law school received 2,303 applications and admitted 14%, of which 97 law students enrolled. In 2024, U.S. News & World Report listed George Mason University School of Law as the 12th hardest law school to get into out of 198 ABA accredited law schools in the United States. The total enrollment of all J.D. students in 2023 was 546 law students. The median LSAT score among incoming J.D. students in 2024 was 168, and the median GPA was 3.92. The passage rate for first-time takers of the Virginia bar exam in July 2023 was 90.7%, third among Virginia's eight law schools.

The school also offers various Master of Laws (LLM) programs such as the Flex-LLM program which focuses on training and qualifying foreign law graduates to take bar exams in various U.S. states. In addition, the school offers in-residence and online LLMs that specialize in subjects such as cybersecurity, global antitrust, and intellectual property.

== Rankings ==
In 2024, U.S. News & World Report ranked the George Mason University School of Law (Scalia) at 28th in the United States. That same year, U.S. News & World Report ranked the school as the 11th-best public law school in the United States.

== Tuition ==
The total cost of attendance (tuition, fees, and living expenses) for the 2023–24 academic year at Mason Law is $62,196 for in-state students attending full-time; the total cost of attendance for non-resident students attending full-time is $78,044. According to The National Jurist, the school was ranked second among all U.S. law schools for lowest debt-to-earnings ratio, surpassed only by Harvard Law School.

== Journals ==
=== Student-edited ===
- George Mason Law Review(ISSN 1088-5625)
- George Mason Civil Rights Law Journal (ISSN 1049-4766)
- George Mason International Law Journal
- National Security Law Journal (ISSN 2373-8464)
- The Journal of Law, Economics & Policy (ISSN 1553-4367)

== Law library ==
The George Mason Law Library has a collection of electronic and print materials providing access to legal treatises, journals, and databases. Non-legal materials are available through the GMU University Libraries. It is a selective depository for U.S. Government documents and it provides interlibrary lending services with other academic libraries.

The library occupies four levels of the law school building. It has 14 study rooms, 70 carrel seats, and 196 table seats. The library also operates two computer labs with a variety of software. The library employs 16 full-time staff members, including 6 librarians with degrees in law and library science and 3 technology specialists. Access is limited to university faculty, students, staff, alumni and members of the bar.

== Academic climate ==
The law school is known for its conservative ideological leaning in law and economics. In addition, the school is known for tilting towards conservative principles, a perception that increased with the renaming in 2016 to honor U.S. Supreme Court Justice Antonin Scalia, a constitutional originalist.

A 2023 New York Times report detailed the school's effort to cultivate ties to the Republican-appointed U.S. Supreme Court justices. The author described the school as "a Yale or Harvard of conservative legal scholarship and influence".

== National Security Institute ==
The law school is also home to the National Security Institute (NSI), a think tank dedicated to research in national security, especially the relevance of legal issues pertaining to national security issues in the global context.

== Global Antitrust Institute ==
Antonin Scalia Law School also houses the Global Antitrust Institute (GAI), a think tank mainly concerned with antitrust and competition policy. In 2021, Bloomberg reported on the "revolving door" between members of the GAI's faculty who later held positions at the Federal Trade Commission, a government agency tasked with regulating many of the companies that make significant donations to the GAI and the law school at large.

== Notable people ==
=== Alumni ===
==== Judges ====
- Katherine A. Crytzer, United States District Judge of the United States District Court for the Eastern District of Tennessee
- William W. Eldridge IV, American General District Court Judge for the 26th Judicial District of Virginia
- Melissa A. Long, Associate Justice of the Rhode Island Supreme Court
- Liam O'Grady, judge of the U.S. District Court for the Eastern District of Virginia
- David J. Porter, judge of the U.S. Court of Appeals for the Third Circuit
- Wesley G. Russell Jr., Justice of the Supreme Court of Virginia
- Richard L. Young, judge of the U.S. District Court for the Southern District of Indiana
- William W. Mercer, judge of the United States District Court for the District of Montana and former United States Associate Attorney General under President George W. Bush

==== Legal academics ====
- Jonathan H. Adler, American legal commentator and law professor at the Case Western Reserve University School of Law
- Josh Blackman, American scholar of United States constitutional law
- Harlan M. Sands, 7th President of Cleveland State University

==== Politicians and public officials ====
- Anna Escobedo Cabral, Treasurer of the United States under President George W. Bush
- James W. Carroll, director of the Office of National Drug Control Policy under President Donald Trump
- Kathleen L. Casey, Commissioner of the U.S. Securities and Exchange Commission
- Ken Cuccinelli, politician, 46th Attorney General of Virginia, Acting United States Deputy Secretary of Homeland Security, and former member of the Virginia Senate from the 37th district
- David Jolly, a former member of the U.S. House of Representatives
- Colleen Kiko, chairman of the United States Federal Labor Relations Authority under Presidents Donald Trump and Joe Biden
- Chris Krebs, director of the Cybersecurity and Infrastructure Security Agency under President Donald Trump
- Paul F. Nichols, former delegate to the Virginia General Assembly
- Maureen Ohlhausen, former commissioner of the U.S. Federal Trade Commission
- Charles Stimson, Deputy Assistant Secretary of Defense for Detainee Affairs under President George W. Bush
- Steve Ricchetti, counselor to the president under President Joe Biden
- Glen Sturtevant, member of the Senate of Virginia from 2016-2020
- David Warrington, White House Counsel during second Trump administration
- Mary Kirtley Waters, Director of the United Nations Information Centre
- John Whitbeck, chairman of the Republican Party of Virginia from 2015-2018

==== Other ====
- Steve Andersen, Rear Admiral and Judge Advocate General of the United States Coast Guard
- Robert Bixby, Executive Director of the Concord Coalition
- John Bartrum, American lawyer and colonel in the United States Air Force Reserve
- Robert A. Levy, chairman of the Cato Institute and director of the Institute of Justice
- Martha Boneta, American policy advisor, commentator, and farmer known for her role in the passage of a landmark right-to-farm law in Virginia
- Michael F. Cannon, director of health policy studies at the Cato Institute
- Rabia Chaudry, Pakistani-American attorney, author, and podcast host; founder and president of the Safe Nation Collaborative
- John Critzos II, American martial arts fighter and instructor teaching martial arts at the United States Naval Academy and personal injury lawyer
- Kendrick Moxon, lead counsel for the Church of Scientology
- Luke Nichols, American YouTuber
- Scott Pinsker, American filmmaker, talk-show host, author, and celebrity publicist

=== Faculty ===
- David Bernstein, university professor, constitutional law scholar, and legal blogger at The Volokh Conspiracy
- Ilya Somin, university professor, scholar at the Cato Institute, and legal blogger at The Volokh Conspiracy
- F. H. Buckley, George Mason University Foundation Professor of Law
- Henry N. Butler, Henry G. Manne Chair in Law and Economics, director of Law & Economics Center and former dean
- Ernest W. DuBester, member of the Federal Labor Relations Authority
- Douglas H. Ginsburg, Senior Judge, U.S. Court of Appeals for the District of Columbia Circuit and former U.S. Supreme Court nominee
- Timothy Muris, George Mason University Foundation Professor of Law, former chairman of the Federal Trade Commission (FTC)
- Todd Zywicki, George Mason University Foundation Professor of Law
