= List of George Mason University people =

This list includes alumni and faculty of George Mason University.

== Presidents ==
The following persons have served as president of George Mason University:

No.	Image	President	Term start	Term end	Ref.
Chancellor of George Mason College (1966–1972)
1		Lorin A. Thompson	1966	1973	
President of George Mason University (1972–present)
2		Vergil H. Dykstra	1973	1977	
3		Robert C. Krug	1977	1978	
4		George W. Johnson	1978	1996	
5		Alan G. Merten	July 1, 1996	June 30, 2012	
6		Ángel Cabrera	July 1, 2012	July 31, 2019	
7 interim		Anne Holton	August 1, 2019	June 30, 2020	
8		Gregory Washington	July 1, 2020	present	

== Notable faculty ==
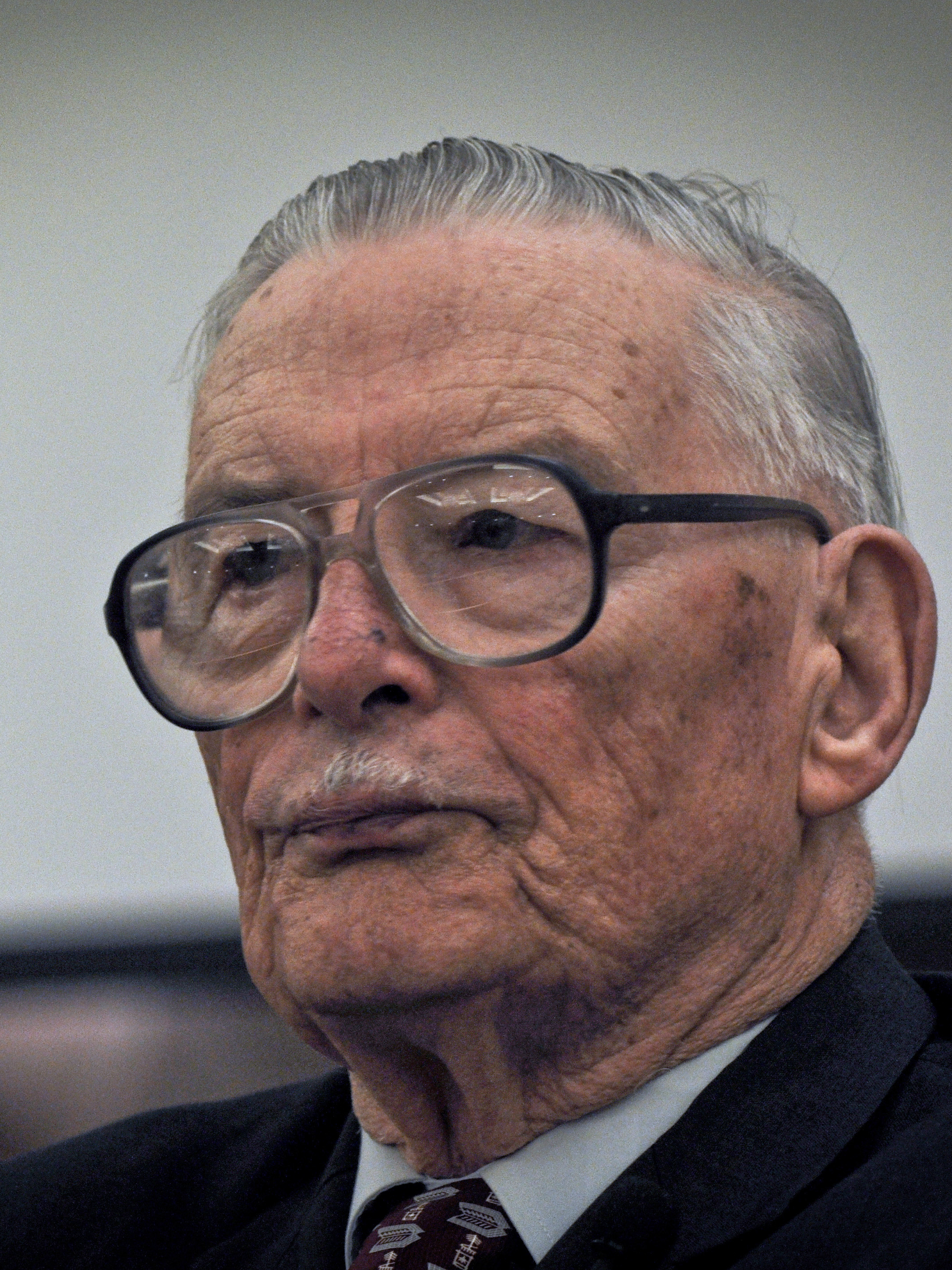
James M. Buchanan, Nobel Prize-winning economist

=== Nobel laureates ===
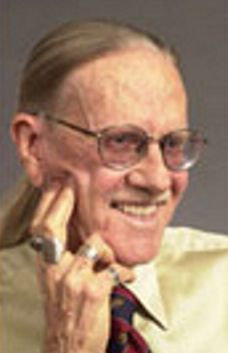
Vernon L. Smith, Nobel Prize-winning economist

- James M. Buchanan, Nobel Prize-winning economist (1986)
- Vernon L. Smith, Nobel Prize-winning economist (2002)

=== Pulitzer Prize winners ===
- Steven Pearlstein, Pulitzer Prize winner for Commentary in 2008
- Martin Sherwin, Pulitzer Prize winner for his biography of Robert Oppenheimer
- Roger Wilkins, Pulitzer Prize winner for coverage of the Watergate scandal (along with Bob Woodward and Carl Bernstein) while he was working at The Washington Post; retired

=== College of Humanities and Social Sciences ===
- William Sims Bainbridge
- Shaul Bakhash, scholar of Persian studies; husband of Haleh Esfandiari
- Mary Catherine Bateson, former Clarence J. Robinson Professor in Anthropology and English; professor emerita
- Robert Bausch, novelist
- Rei Berroa, poet
- Andrés Boiarsky
- Courtney Angela Brkic, poet
- Alan Cheuse, novelist
- Arthur W. Chickering
- Jeremy Crampton, cartographer
- Wilfrid Desan
- Bùi Diễm, South Vietnam's ambassador to the United States
- Robert J. Elder, Jr, Air Force commander
- Marita Golden, novelist
- Gerald L. Gordon
- Joshua Greenberg
- Hugh Gusterson
- Helon Habila
- Deanna Hammond
- Frances V. Harbour
- Hugh Heclo, professor of American politics and winner of John Gaus award
- Carma Hinton, documentary filmmaker, The Gate of Heavenly Peace
- Susan Hirsch, legal and linguistic anthropologist
- Mark N. Katz
- Peter Klappert, poet
- Gary L Kreps
- Thelma Z. Lavine, philosopher
- Suzannah Lessard, writer
- Lawrence W. Levine, historian
- Samuel Robert Lichter, former professor at Princeton University, Georgetown University, George Washington University, Yale, and Columbia University
- Peter Mandaville, professor of international affairs and scholar of political Islam
- Nadine Meyer, poet
- Robert Nadeau, English professor
- Eric Pankey, poet
- Roy Rosenzweig
- Richard E. Rubenstein
- Clare Shore
- Susan Shreve
- Richard Norton Smith, presidential historian; former director of five presidential libraries
- Rod Smith, poet
- Peter Stearns, American historian and former provost
- Lev Vekker, psychologist
- Rex A. Wade, professor of Russian history
- Margaret R. Yocom
- Mary Kay Zuravleff, novelist

=== Department of Economics ===
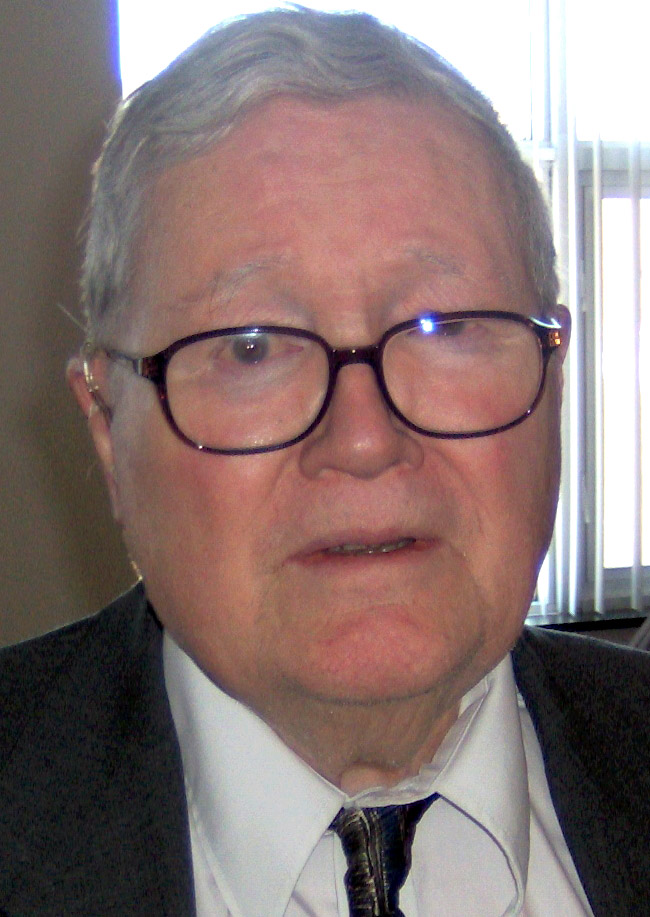
Gordon Tullock, developed the public choice theory

- Peter Boettke
- Donald J. Boudreaux
- Henry N. Butler
- Bryan Caplan
- Tyler Cowen
- Christopher Coyne
- Richard H. Fink, executive vice president of Koch Industries
- Joseph L. Fisher, U.S. congressman from Virginia
- Jack A. Goldstone
- Wendy Lee Gramm
- Robin Hanson
- Laurence Iannaccone
- Manuel H. Johnson, former vice governor of the Federal Reserve
- Daniel B. Klein
- Arnold Kling
- Don Lavoie
- Peter T. Leeson
- Kevin McCabe
- Maurice McTigue, former Minister for Labor in New Zealand
- James C. Miller III, director of the Office of Management and Budget under President Ronald Reagan
- Jennifer Roback Morse
- Russ Roberts, host of EconTalk
- George Selgin
- Alex Tabarrok
- Robert Tollison
- Gordon Tullock, developed the public choice theory
- Richard E. Wagner
- Lawrence H. White
- Walter E. Williams, John M. Olin Distinguished Professor of Economics
- Bart Wilson
- Bruce Yandle, executive director of the Federal Trade Commission

=== School of Art ===
- Chawky Frenn

=== Jimmy and Rosalynn Carter School for Peace and Conflict Resolution ===
- Kevin Avruch, Henry Hart Rice Professor of Conflict Resolution and Professor of Anthropology and Dean of S-CAR
- Marc Gopin, James H. Laue Professor of World Religions, Diplomacy and Conflict Resolution
- Susan Hirsch, professor of Conflict Resolution and Anthropology
- Richard E. Rubenstein, University Professor of Conflict Resolution and Public Affairs

=== Schar School of Policy and Government ===
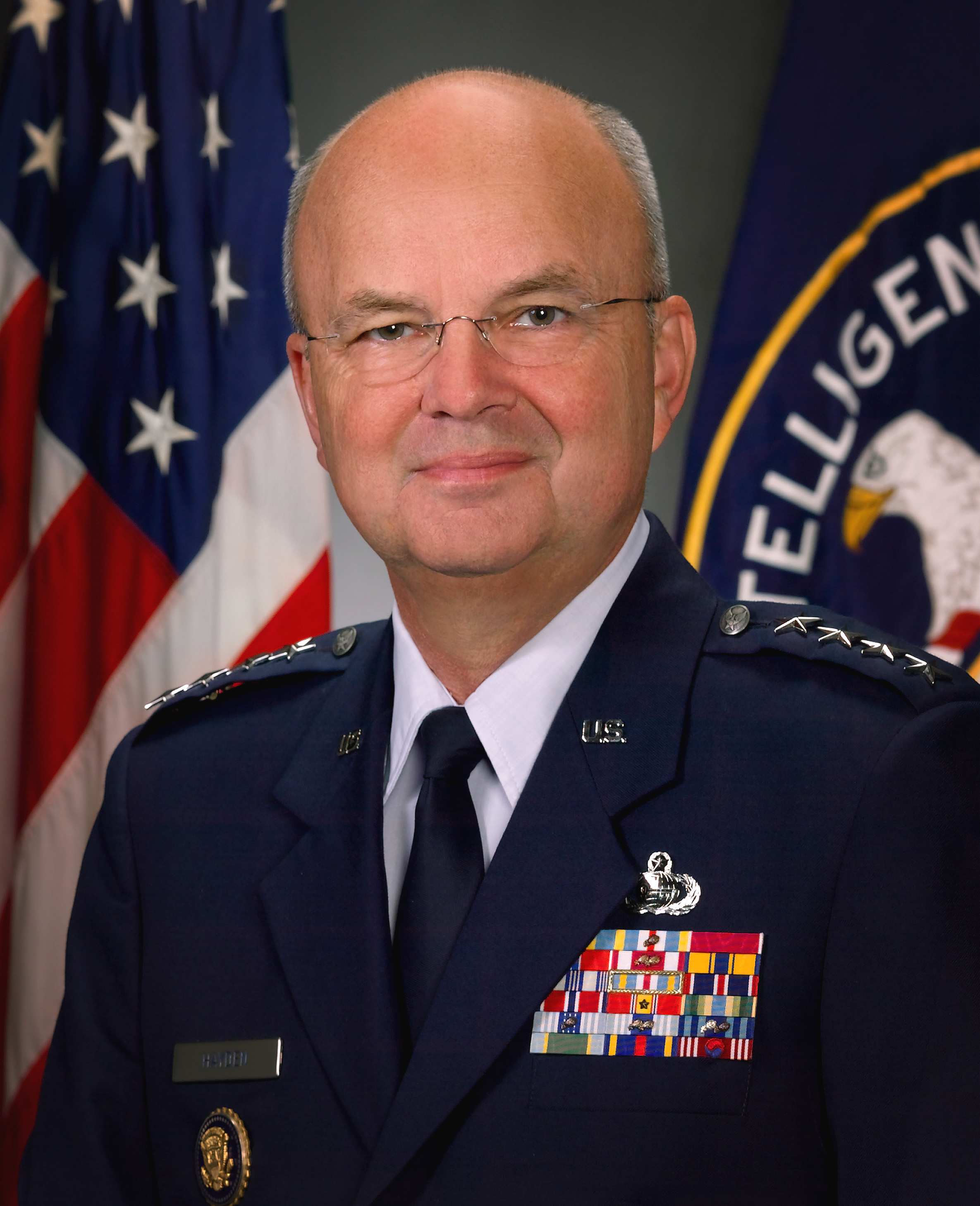
Michael Hayden, former director of the CIA

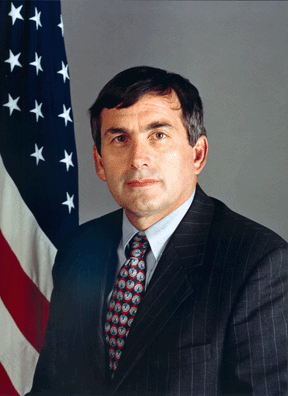
Thomas J. Miller, United States Ambassador to Greece and Bosnia and Herzegovina

- Zoltan Acs
- David S. Alberts, director of research for the Office of the Assistant Secretary of Defense
- Kenneth Button
- Thomas M. Davis, former U.S. congressman from Virginia
- Robert Deitz, former chief counsel of the Central Intelligence Agency and National Security Agency
- Desmond Dinan
- Richard Florida
- William Conrad Gibbons
- Marc Gopin
- Stephen Haseler
- Michael Hayden, former director of the Central Intelligence Agency and National Security Agency
- Ellen Laipson, former CEO of The Stimson Center
- Seymour Martin Lipset
- Andrew McCabe, former acting director of the Federal Bureau of Investigation
- Serena McIlwain, secretary of the Maryland Department of the Environment
- Patrick Mendis, diplomat and expert on Sino-American relations
- Patrick Michaels, climatologist
- Thomas J. Miller, former United States Ambassador to Greece, and Bosnia and Herzegovina
- Michael Morell, former acting director of the Central Intelligence Agency
- Mike Pence, former Vice President of the United States
- Saskia Popescu, infectious disease epidemiologist
- Bill Schneider, Los Angeles Times contributor and former CNN senior political analyst
- Jeremy Shearmur
- Louise Shelley
- Richard Norton Smith
- John N. Warfield

=== College of Science ===
- Yakir Aharonov (professor 2006–2008), physicist, known for Aharonov–Bohm effect, winner of National Medal of Science (2009)
- David Albright
- Ken Alibek, colonel in the Soviet Union in charge of biodefense
- Robert Axtell
- Peter J. Denning
- Genevieve Grotjan Feinstein, mathematician and cryptanalyst
- Klaus Fischer, mathematician
- Peter A. Freeman
- Rebecca Goldin, mathematician
- Robert Hazen, Clarence Robinson Professor of Earth Science; author
- Abul Hussam, inventor of the Sono arsenic filter, for which he received the 2007 sustainability prize awarded by the National Academy of Engineering
- Thomas Lovejoy
- Angela Orebaugh
- Suresh V. Shenoy
- Jagdish Shukla, meteorologist
- Fred Singer
- John P. Snyder, cartographer
- James Trefil, physicist, and author
- Ernst Volgenau, chairman and founder of SRA International
- Edward Wegman, statistician
- Boris Willis

=== School of Systems Biology ===
- Valery Soyfer

=== Donald G. Costello College of Business ===
- Anthony Sanders, Distinguished Professor of Real Estate Finance
- Ajay Vinze, dean of the School of Business

=== Antonin Scalia Law School ===
- Jonathan H. Adler, legal commentator and law professor
- Steve Andersen, rear admiral and Judge Advocate General of the United States Coast Guard
- Peter Berkowitz
- David Bernstein
- Lawrence J. Block, federal judge
- Frank H. Buckley
- Henry N. Butler, Republican candidate for member of the U.S. House of Representatives from Virginia's 11th congressional district
- Susan Dudley, administrator of the Office of Information and Regulatory Affairs under President George W. Bush
- Victoria Espinel, United States intellectual property enforcement coordinator
- Adrian S. Fisher, lawyer, diplomat, and politician during the 1960s and 1970s
- Sandra Froman, president of the National Rifle Association of America
- Sigrid Fry-Revere, founder and president of Center for Ethical Solutions
- Ernest Gellhorn
- Douglas H. Ginsburg, judge on the United States Court of Appeals for the District of Columbia Circuit; Ronald Reagan's nominee to the United States Supreme Court
- Neil Gorsuch, associate justice of the Supreme Court of the United States
- Brett Kavanaugh, associate justice of the Supreme Court of the United States
- William Kovacic, former member of the Federal Trade Commission
- Michael I. Krauss, former commissioner for Québec's Human Rights Commission
- William H. Lash, former United States assistant secretary of commerce
- James LeMunyon, former United States assistant secretary of commerce
- Robert A. Levy, chairman of the Cato Institute
- Leonard Liggio, vice president of Atlas Economic Research Foundation
- Deborah Platt Majoras, former chairman of the Federal Trade Commission
- Henry Manne
- James C. Miller III, chairman of the Federal Trade Commission; Budget Director for President Ronald Reagan
- John Warwick Montgomery
- Timothy Muris, former chairman of the Federal Trade Commission
- Paul F. Nichols, former delegate to the Virginia General Assembly
- Raymond O'Brien
- Daniel D. Polsby, dean of Law
- Jeremy A. Rabkin
- Steve Ricchetti, served as White House deputy chief of staff in the Clinton administration; counselor to Vice President Joe Biden
- Chuck Robb, former governor of Virginia; former U.S. senator
- Kyndra Miller Rotunda, Army JAG officer
- Hans-Bernd Schäfer
- Loren A. Smith, Federal Judge
- Clarence Thomas, associate justice of the Supreme Court of the United States
- Michael Uhlmann
- Clay T. Whitehead, former director of the White House Office of Telecommunications Policy
- Todd Zywicki, former director of the Office of Policy Planning at the Federal Trade Commission

=== School of Recreation, Health, and Tourism ===
- Steve Baumann, chief executive of the National Soccer Hall of Fame
- Charley Casserly, general manager of the Washington Redskins and Houston Texans
- Craig Esherick, former head coach of the Georgetown basketball team

== Notable alumni ==
=== Corporate/non-profit ===
- Muna AbuSulayman (Muna Abu-Sulayman), secretary general and executive director, Alwaleed Philanthropies
- Erden Eruç, president, CEO, Around-n-Over
- Zainab Salbi, president, Women for Women International
- Will Seippel, executive
- Roy Speckhardt, executive director, American Humanist Association
- Martin Andrew Taylor, former senior executive corporate VP of Windows Live and MSN

=== Government, politics, and economics ===
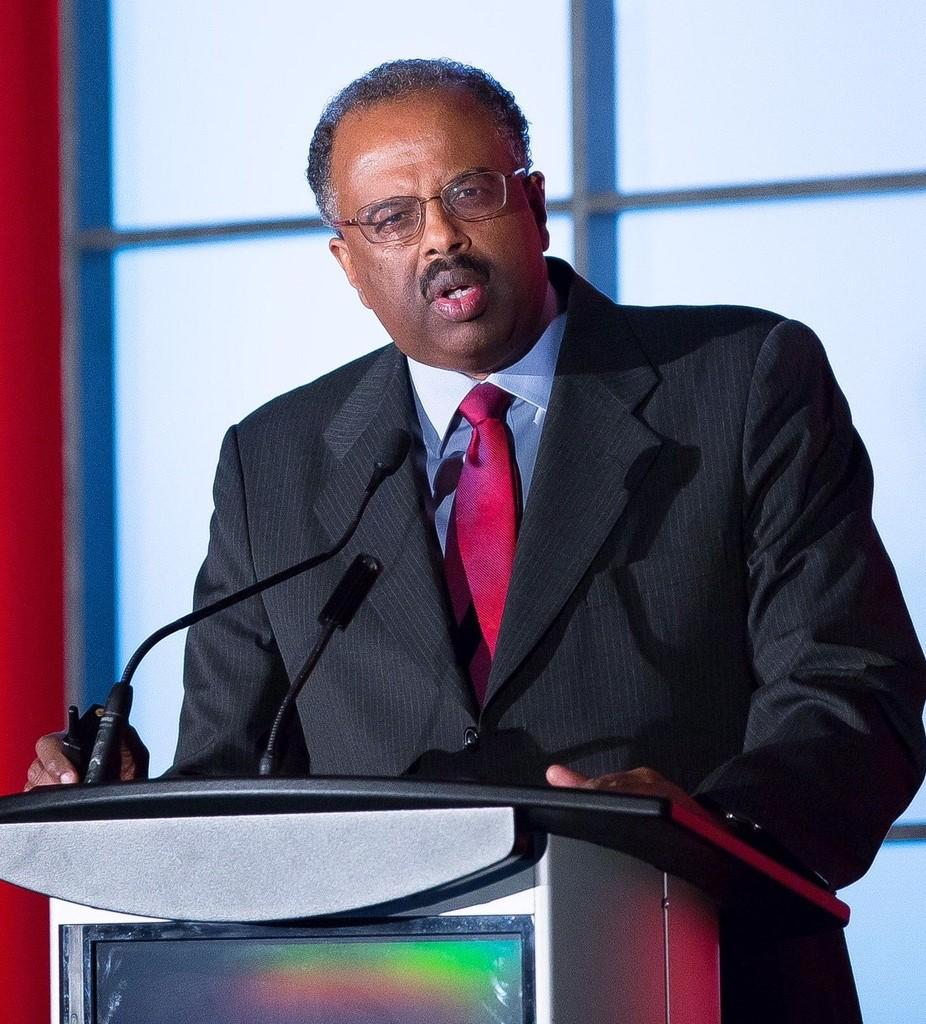
2015 IB Conference presentation - Dr. Abdirahman M Abdi

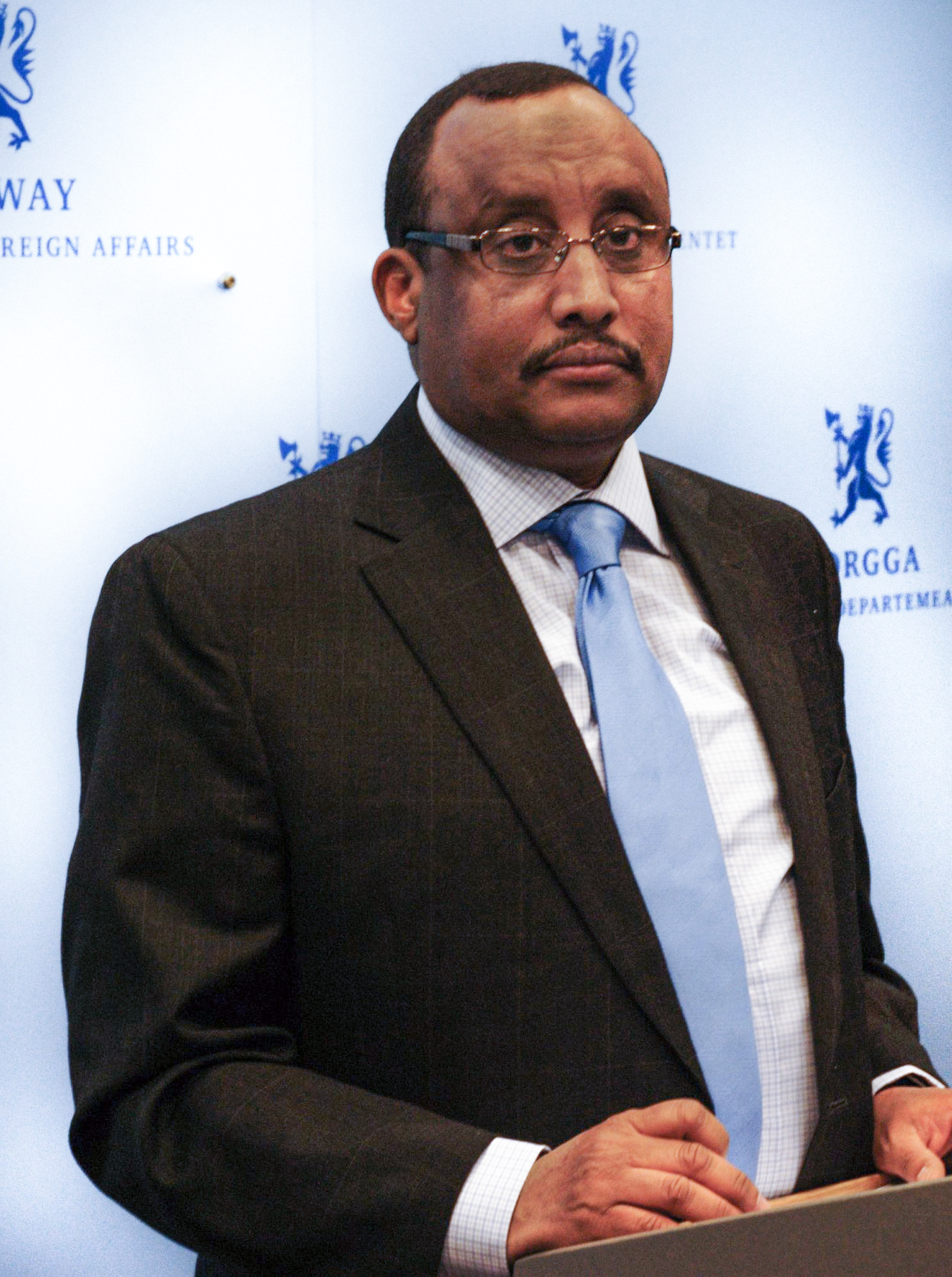
Abdiweli Mohamed Ali, PM of Somalia

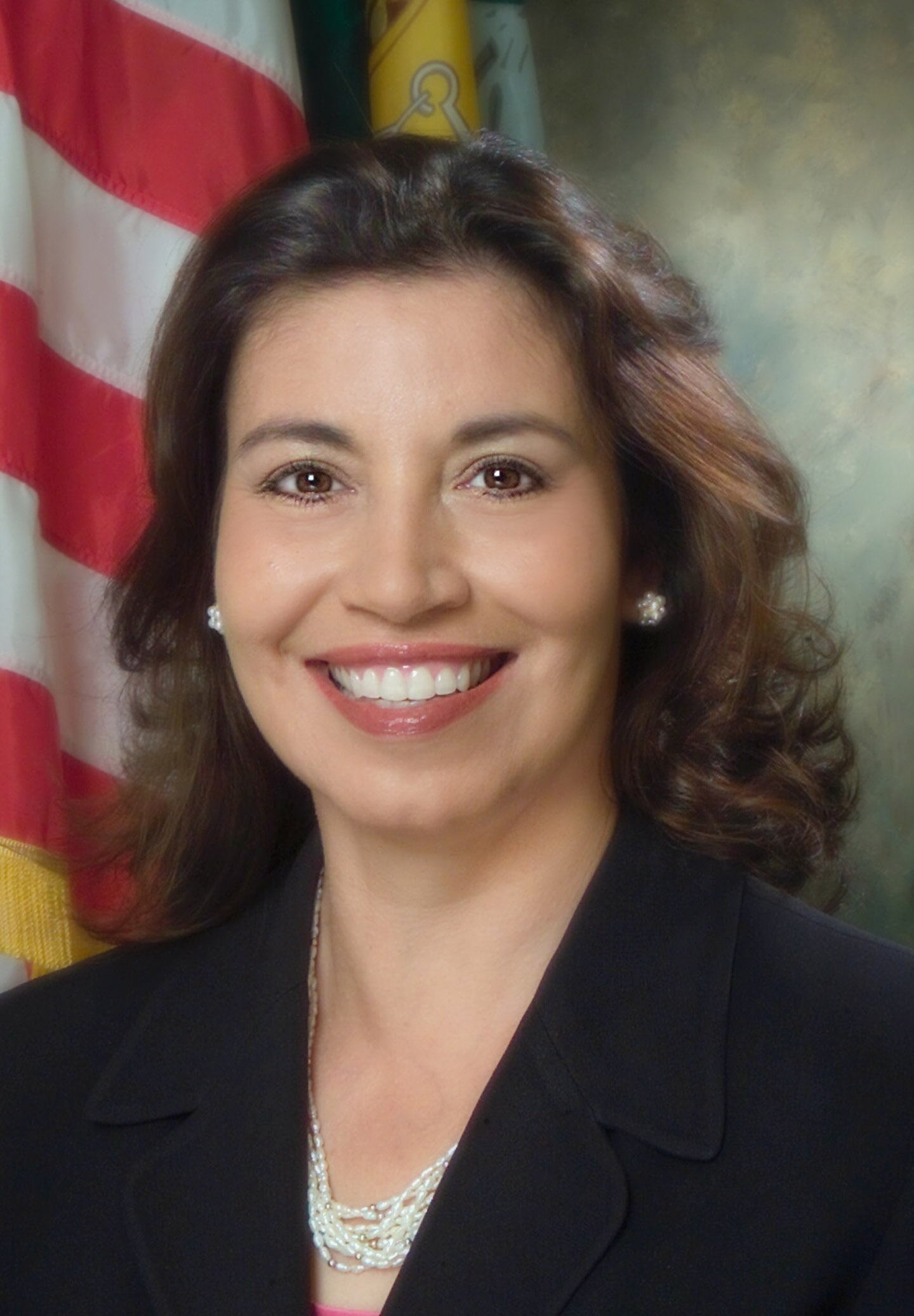
Anna Cabral, treasurer of the United States

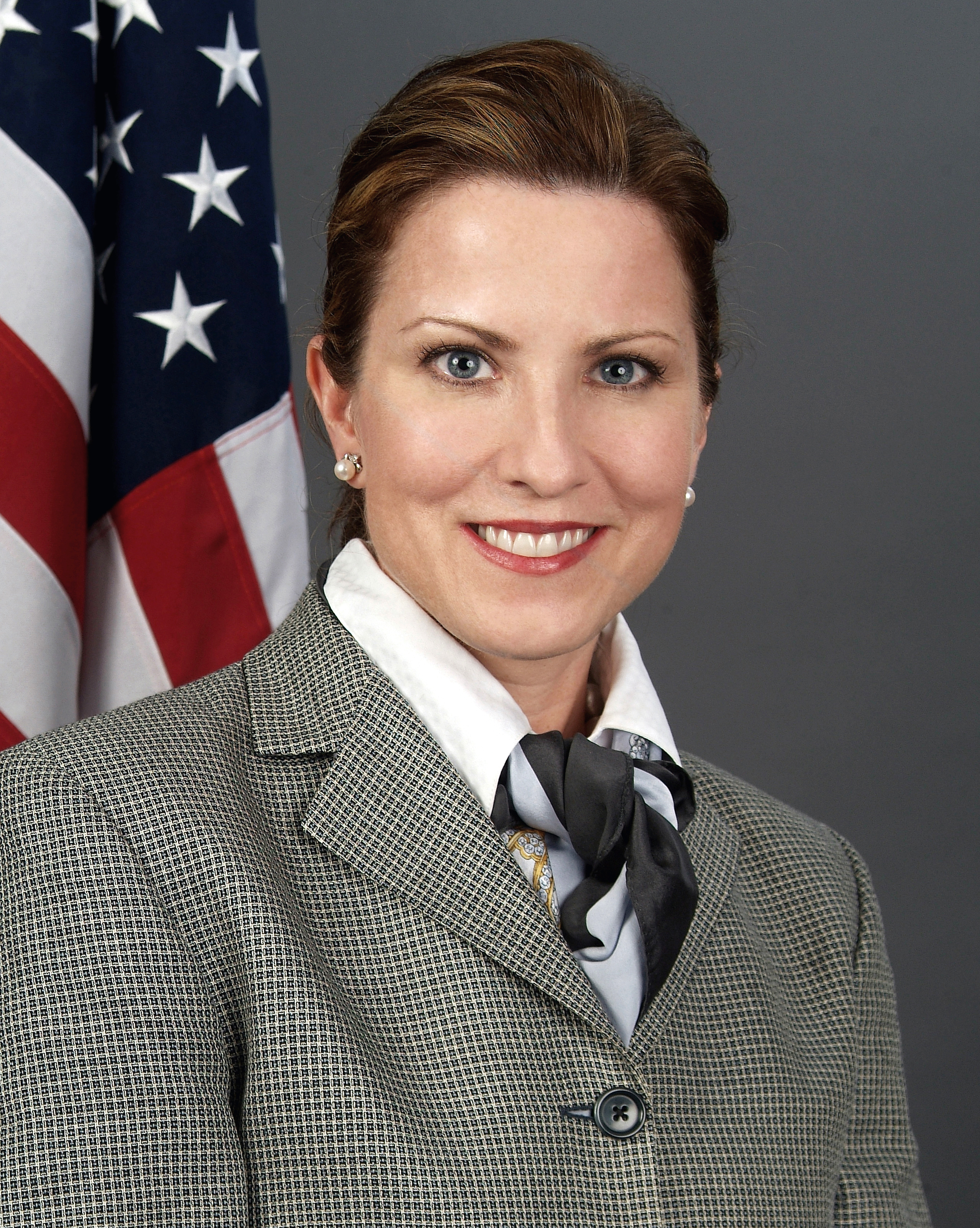
Kathleen Casey, Commissioner of the U.S. Securities and Exchange Commission

- Abdirahman M. Abdi, Somali politician, economist, and former Minister of Fisheries and Blue Economy in the Federal Government of Somalia
- Abdiweli Mohamed Ali, president of Puntland and former prime minister of Somalia
- Don Beyer, Member of the U.S. House of Representatives from Virginia's 8th district.
- David Bobzien, member of the Nevada Assembly
- Denise Bode, energy expert, member of President George W. Bush's Energy Transition Advisory Team
- Anna E. Cabral, treasurer of the United States under President George W. Bush
- Kathleen L. Casey, commissioner of the U.S. Securities and Exchange Commission
- Sandra Cauffman, NASA
- John Cobin, American-born Chilean economist and politician, former U.S. Libertarian Party candidate, and founder of the Galt's Gulch Libertarian Compound in Chile; known for his involvement in the 2019 Reñaca shooting during the 2019–2021 Chilean protests
- Sean Connaughton, Virginia secretary of transportation and former U.S. maritime administrator
- Garrison Courtney, chief of Public Affairs of the Drug Enforcement Administration
- Ken Cuccinelli, attorney general of Virginia
- Bob Deuell, Texas state senator
- Christine Fox, former acting U.S. deputy secretary of defense
- Michael Frey, member of the Fairfax County Board of Supervisors
- Nancy Garland, member of the Ohio house of representatives
- Juleanna Glover, press secretary to Vice President Dick Cheney
- Jim Hagedorn, Member of the U.S. House of Representatives from Minnesota's 1st district.
- Bethany Hall-Long, Governor of Delaware
- William D. Hansen, US deputy secretary of Education under President George W. Bush
- Charniele Herring, former majority leader, Virginia House of Delegates
- Deborah Hersman, National Transportation Safety Board
- Cathy Hudgins, member of the Fairfax County Board of Supervisors
- David Jolly, Member of the U.S. House of Representatives from Florida's 13th district.
- Mohammad Khazaee, representative of the Islamic Republic of Iran to the UN
- Kaye Kory, Virginia House delegate
- Sherri Kraham, deputy VP at the Millennium Challenge Corporation
- Nathan Larson, former politician, arrested in Denver, Colorado and faces child kidnapping and child pornography charges
- Patrick Lechleitner, acting director of the U.S. Immigration and Customs Enforcement
- Mark B. Madsen, Utah state senator
- Harold T. Martin III, National Security Agency contractor convicted of theft of classified information
- Mike Mazzei, Oklahoma state Senator
- William W. Mercer, United States attorney for the District of Montana
- Riley Moore, Member of the U.S. House of Representatives from West Virginia's 2nd district.
- John Morlu, Liberian presidential candidate
- Paul F. Nichols, Virginia House delegate
- Liam O'Grady, United States federal judge
- Nancy Pfotenhauer, adviser to the 2008 John McCain presidential campaign
- David Ramadan, member of the Virginia House of Delegates
- Steve Ricchetti, former Counselor to the President of the United States under President Joe Biden and former deputy chief of staff to President Bill Clinton
- Denise Turner Roth, former administrator of the GSA
- James M. Scott, Virginia House delegate
- William P. Winfree, NASA
- Chris Wood, director of the Central Intelligence Agency's Counterterrorism Center
- Richard L. Young, United States federal judge

=== Literary and media ===
- Richard Bausch, novelist
- Robert Bausch, novelist
- Stuart Cosgrove, Scottish journalist, broadcaster and television executive
- Sharon Creech, novelist
- Chad Ford, sports journalist and founder of ESPN Insider
- Angie Goff, news anchor, NBC 4 Washington WRC-TV
- Hala Gorani, news anchor, CNN International
- Brian Krebs, journalist
- Carolyn Kreiter-Foronda, Poet Laureate of Virginia
- J. Michael Martinez, poet
- Nadine Meyer, poet
- Stephen Moore, journalist, policy analyst, The Wall Street Journal and Fox News
- Evan Oakley, poet
- Nancy K. Pearson, poet
- Susan Rook, news anchor, CNN
- Clayton Swisher, journalist, Al Jazeera English
- Rebecca Wee, poet
- Mark Winegardner, author

=== Sports and entertainment ===
- Julius Achon, Ugandan distance runner, 800m American collegiate record holder
- Joe Addo, soccer player
- Mark Adickes, football player
- Murielle Ahouré, NCAA Indoor Track and Field Championships All-American in the 60-meter dash
- Jorge Andres, anchor and NFL analyst for NBC Universal; former Sportscenter anchor for ESPN
- Negar Assari, artist
- Abdi Bile, Olympic runner
- Justin Bour, baseball player, Miami Marlins
- Brent Brockman, soccer player
- Bill Brown, George Mason baseball coach
- Lamar Butler, basketball player
- Shawn Camp, baseball player, Toronto Blue Jays
- Folarin Campbell, basketball player
- Rebecca Cardon, actress
- Keri Chaconas, basketball player
- Terri Dendy, Olympic track and field athlete
- Jennifer Derevjanik, basketball player
- Ben Dogra, sports agent
- John Driscoll, actor
- Chad Dukes, radio host, WJFK-FM
- Jerry Dunn, basketball coach
- Ryan Ellis, NASCAR driver
- George Evans, basketball player
- Denis Hamlett, soccer coach
- Luke Hancock, former George Mason basketball player; current Louisville basketball player
- Richard Hatch, winner of the first season of Survivor
- Nikki Hornsby, singer, songwriter, musician, recording artist, founder of CJP-NHRecords
- Jake Kalish, baseball player
- King Kamali, Iranian bodybuilder
- Archie Kao, actor
- Joelle Khoury, musician (pianist and composer)
- Sarah Kozer, television personality, appeared on Joe Millionaire
- Jim Larranaga, Mason's head men's basketball coach 1997–2011
- Jai Lewis, basketball player
- Bob Lilley, soccer player and head coach
- Tamir Linhart, soccer player
- Jason Miskiri, former NBA basketball player for the Charlotte Hornets
- Dayton Moore, general manager, senior VP, Kansas City Royals
- Mike Morrison, basketball player
- Paige Moss, actress
- Rob Muzzio, decathlon champion, Olympic athlete
- Luke Nichols, YouTuber, attorney
- Anthony Noreiga, soccer player
- Gabe Norwood, Philippine Basketball Association player
- Ryan Pearson, basketball player
- Richard Phillips, Jamaican sprinter; competed in the 110 metres hurdles at the 2004, 2008, and the 2012 Summer Olympics
- Jennifer Pitts, Miss Virginia, Miss Virginia USA
- Mark Pulisic, soccer player
- Charlie Raphael, soccer player
- Rob Rose, former NBA basketball player for the Los Angeles Clippers
- Dianna Russini, ESPN anchor
- Kenny Sanders, basketball player
- Rhea Seehorn, actress
- Ritch Shydner, comedian
- Tony Skinn, basketball player
- Tommy Steenberg, ice skater
- Shawn Stiffler, college baseball coach at VCU
- Will Thomas, basketball player
- David Verburg, 400m sprinter; won the gold medal in the 2013 World Championship 4 × 400 m relay
- Alan Webb, American record holder in the mile
- Chris Widger, former MLB baseball player
- Aimee Willard, lacrosse player
- Ricky Wilson, former NBA basketball player for the San Antonio Spurs and the New Jersey Nets
- Carlos Yates, basketball player
- Jesse Young, basketball player; member of the Canada national team that participated in the 1999 and 2003 Pan American Games
- Kate Ziegler, world record distance swimmer

=== Other ===
- Ali al-Tamimi, convicted terrorist
- Amir Ansari, venture capitalist
- Anousheh Ansari, space tourist
- Sandy Antunes, astronomer
- Randall C. Berg, Jr., lawyer
- Allison Black, military officer
- M. Brian Blake, professor
- Mark A. Calabria, director of Financial Regulation Studies at the Cato Institute
- Alan M. Davis, engineer and businessman
- Chris DiBona, Google Public Sector director
- Sibel Edmonds, former Federal Bureau of Investigation translator
- Fred E. Foldvary, economist
- Graham Foust, professor and poet
- Steven Horwitz, economist
- Raynard Jackson, Republican political consultant
- Matt Kibbe, president and CEO of FreedomWorks
- Jonathan Klick, professor
- Robert A. Levy, chairman of the Cato Institute
- Jeb Livingood, professor and writer
- Daniel Mann, lawyer
- George Michael, professor
- Kendrick Moxon, lawyer and Scientologist
- Sareh Nouri, fashion designer
- Angela Orebaugh, cyber security technologist and professor
- Mark Perry, professor
- Brad Pfaff, USDA Wisconsin Farm Service Agency executive director
- David Prychitko, economist
- Jose Rodriguez, political activist
- Stephen Slivinski, economist for the Goldwater Institute
- Victoria Stiles, makeup artist
- Edward Stringham, professor
- Jeffery Taubenberger, virologist
- Deborah Willis, photographer and professor
