= Klaus Fischer (disambiguation) =

Klaus Fischer (born 1949) is a German football player and coach.

Klaus Fischer may also refer to:

- Klaus Fischer (mathematician) (1943–2009), American mathematician

== See also ==
- Klaus Fischer-Dieskau (1921–1994), German church musician
