= Slivinski =

Slivinski is a surname. Notable people with the surname include:

- Mike Slivinski (born 1974), American soccer player
- Stephen Slivinski, American economist
- Steve Slivinski (1917–2008), American football player
