= Jimmy and Rosalynn Carter School for Peace and Conflict Resolution =

Constituent college of George Mason University

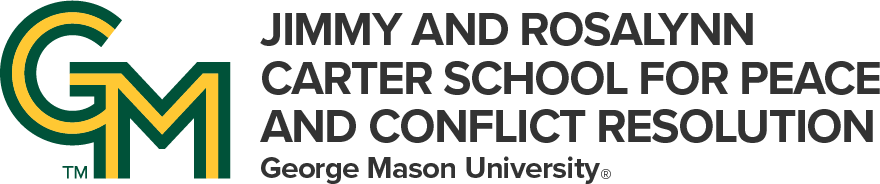
- Former names: School for Conflict Analysis and Resolution
- Type: Constituent college of Peace and conflict studies
- Established: March 1981
- Founders: Bryant Wedge, Henry C. Barringer
- Parent institution: George Mason University
- Dean: Alpaslan Özerdem
- Undergraduates: 153
- Postgraduates: 218
- Location: Arlington, Virginia, Fairfax, Virginia, Lorton, Virginia, U.S. Songdo, South Korea
- Website: carterschool.gmu.edu

The Jimmy and Rosalynn Carter School for Peace and Conflict Resolution (formerly known as the School for Conflict Analysis and Resolution or S-CAR) is a constituent college of George Mason University based near Washington, D.C., United States, specializing in peace and conflict studies with locations in Arlington, Fairfax, and Lorton, Virginia, as well as at the Mason Korea campus in Songdo, South Korea. On July 1, 2020, the School for Conflict Analysis and Resolution was renamed the Jimmy and Rossalyn Carter School for Peace and Conflict Resolution, following an announcement by the university in March 2020.

== History ==
The Carter School was founded in 1981 as the Center for Conflict Analysis, later named the Center for Conflict Analysis and Resolution (CCAR) and began offering a master's degree in Conflict Analysis and Resolution in 1983. In 1988 it became the first academic institution to grant PhD's in Conflict Analysis and Resolution and rose to the status of Institute, becoming ICAR in 1989. In 2010, after a decade of growth and development, including the introduction of the undergraduate program and graduate certificate programs, it became the School for Conflict Analysis and Resolution (S-CAR). In 2020 the school was renamed in dedication to Nobel Peace Prize awarded humanitarian former U.S. president Jimmy Carter and his wife Rosalynn as the Jimmy and Rosalynn Carter School for Peace and Conflict Resolution.

== Academic programs ==
- PhD - Doctorate of Philosophy
- MS - Master of Science in Conflict Analysis and Resolution
  - Concentration in Social Justice Advocacy and Activism
  - Concentration in Dynamics of Violence
  - Concentration in Inclusive Conflict Engagement
  - Concentration in Conflict-Sensitive Development and Resilience
  - Concentration in Media, Narrative, and Public Discourse
  - Individualized Concentration
- BA/BS - Bachelor of Arts or Science in Conflict Analysis and Resolution
  - Concentration in Building Peace in Divided Societies
  - Concentration in Global Engagement
  - Concentration in Political and Social Action
  - Concentration in Justice and Reconciliation
  - Concentration in Interpersonal Dynamics
  - Concentration in Collaborative Leadership
- Graduate Certificates in Conflict Analysis and Resolution
  - Conflict Analysis and Resolution Advanced Skills
  - Conflict Analysis and Resolution Collaborative Leadership in Community Planning
  - Prevention and Stabilization Contexts
  - World Religions and Peacebuilding
  - Collaborative Community Action
- Dual master's degree with the University of Malta - Master of Science in Conflict Analysis and Resolution and Master of Arts in Conflict Resolution and Mediterranean Security
- Dual Degree - Master of Science in Conflict Analysis and Resolution and Master of Social Work

== Research and practice centers ==
- Center for World Religions, Diplomacy and Conflict Resolution
- Center for Peacemaking Practice
- Center for the Study of Gender and Conflict Resolution
- Peace and Conflict Studies Center Asia (PACSC Asia)
- Center for the Study of Narrative and Conflict Resolution
- Mary Hoch Center for Reconciliation

== Programs and projects ==
- Experiential Learning Program
- Insight Conflict Resolution Program
- Parents of the Field Project
- Dialogue and Difference Project
- Zones of Peace Survey
- Genocide Prevention Program
- Genocide Watch
- Sudan Task Group
- South West Asia Group
- Program on Contentious Politics
- Program for the Prevention of Mass Violence

== Notable alumni ==
- Mohammed Abu-Nimer, expert on conflict resolution and dialog for peace. Professor at the American University School of International Service
- Chad Ford, ESPN sports journalist and assistant professor at Brigham Young University – Hawaii (BYUH)
- Deborah Hersman, former chair of the U.S. National Transportation Safety Board
- Alma Jadallah, national and international conflict resolution practitioner and scholar, President and managing director of Kommon Denominator, Inc.
- January Makamba, Tanzanian politician and member of Parliament for Bumbuli constituency, Deputy Minister of Communication, Science and Technology

== Current faculty ==
- Kevin Avruch - Henry Hart Rice Professor of Conflict Resolution and Professor of Anthropology
- Sandra Cheldelin - Professor Emerita of Conflict Resolution
- Charles Chavis
- Sara Cobb - Drucie French Cumbie Professor of Conflict Analysis and Resolution
- Leslie Dwyer
- Thomas Flores
- Marc Gopin - James H. Laue Professor of World Religions, Diplomacy and Conflict Resolution
- Susan Hirsch - Vernon M. and Minnie Lynch Chair of Conflict Resolution
- Karina Korostelina
- Terrence Lyons
- Christopher Mitchell - Professor Emeritus of Conflict Analysis and Resolution
- Alpaslan Özerdem - Dean, Professor of Peace and Conflict Studies
- Agnieszka Paczynska
- Daniel Rothbart
- Arthur Romano
- Richard E. Rubenstein - University Professor of Conflict Resolution and Public Affairs
- Solon Simmons
- Roland B. Wilson - Program Coordinator and Professor at S-CAR Korea
- Julie Shedd - Associate Dean of S-CAR
- Susan Allen
- Suzanne de Janasz - Visiting Professor of Management and Conflict Resolution
- Douglas Irvin-Erickson
- Tehama Lopez Bunyasi
- Patricia Maulden
- James Price
- Mara Schoeny

== Past faculty ==
- Henry C. Barringer – U.S. Foreign Service Officer (Ret)
- Andrea Bartoli – Dean of the School of Diplomacy and International Relations at Seton Hall University
- Ben Broom
- John Burton – Former head of the Australian Foreign Office and founder of the Conflict Resolution Program at the University of London
- Mary E. Clark – former Drucie French Cumbie Chair in Conflict Resolution at George Mason University
- Kevin P. Clements – Professor of Peace and Conflict Studies at the University of Otago, New Zealand
- Dan Druckman
- Dennis Sandole (1941-2018) - former Professor of Conflict Resolution and International Relations
- Joe Gittler (1912-2005)
- James H. Laue (1937–1993) – former Professor of Conflict Resolution and served on the U.S. Department of Justice's Community Relations Service (CRS)
- Michelle LeBaron
- Tamra Pearson D'stree
- Joe Scimecca
- Wallace Warfield (1938–2010) – Professor of Conflict Analysis and Resolution, community mediator and acting director of the U.S. Department of Justice's New York Community Relations Service
- Bryant Wedge – Social psychiatrist, first director of CCR, worked for the State Department and the Arms Control and Disarmament Agency
- Tom Williams
- Nadim Rouhana – Former Henry Hart Rice Professor of Conflict Resolution and Analysis

== Distinguished fellows, visiting scholars and lecturers ==
- Elise M. Boulding
- Kenneth E. Boulding
- Ron Fisher
- Johan Galtung
- Herbert Kelman
- Debra Kolb
- Dean Pruitt
- Anatol Rapoport
- Peter Wallensteen
