= Center for World Religions, Diplomacy and Conflict Resolution =

The Center for World Religions, Diplomacy and Conflict Resolution (CRDC) is an arm of George Mason University's Jimmy and Rosalynn Carter School for Peace and Conflict Resolution. CRDC engages in practice, education, and research concerning peace-building in conflicts where religion and culture play a significant role in a destructive conflict. CRDC specializes in entrepreneurial engagement with partners, students and supporters who share the goal of promoting emerging networks of indigenous and global peacemakers; mobilizing support for them; and forging links between such people, citizen-diplomats, and policymakers.

== History ==
CRDC began in 2003 with a gift from the Catalyst Fund, which endowed the James H. Laue Chair in World Religions, Diplomacy, and Conflict Resolution, and created CRDC to be directed by the chair. The chair is named for James H. Laue, the inaugural Vernon M. and Minnie I. Lynch Professor of Conflict Resolution at George Mason from 1987 until his death in 1993.

== Activities ==
CRDC offers public presentations to governments and nongovernmental organizations; formal training in religion, diplomacy and conflict analysis; consulting for agencies dealing with religion and conflict; recommendations for ongoing conflicts; and support of religious moderates in international disputes.

=== Research ===
The center is also active in research. It analyzes religious traditions and practices for new areas of creative diplomacy, examines internal struggles within religious communities, and searches for ways in which religious practices may heal conflicts beyond the reach of normal diplomacy and conflict resolution.

=== Work with Jordan ===
CRDC coordinated a meeting between King Abdullah II of the Hashemite Kingdom of Jordan and over 60 American rabbis on September 21, 2005, at the Ritz-Carlton Hotel in Washington, DC. The event was sponsored by the Embassy of Jordan, and coordinated by the CRDC and Dr. Robert Eisen of George Washington University. Since 2016, CRDC has also conducted overseas seminars in Jordan for graduate and undergraduate students that offer the opportunity to conduct fieldwork with Syrian refugees. These seminars were previously hosted in Turkey from 2013 to 2015.

=== Work in Syria ===
To promote interfaith dialogue, CRDC co-sponsored a televised debate in Syria on religion, tolerance and the state of political relations in the Middle East on May 25, 2005. Conceived by local Syrian activists, the event was sponsored to recognize the divisions facing the Middle East in which religion and politics intersect, such as the Israeli–Palestinian conflict or the war on terrorism.

=== Rumi Forum ===
A program on "Citizen Diplomacy and the Future of Peaceful Religion: A Tale of Middle Eastern Peacemaking" was presented in Washington, D.C. by Dr. Marc Gopin at the Rumi Forum (an emerging group from Turkey advocating peaceful coexistence globally through a series of schools worldwide). Gopin examines a case study in citizen diplomacy in his book, To Make the Earth Whole: Citizen Diplomacy in the Age of Religious Militancy (Rowman Littlefield, 2009). He describes the challenge of engaging with the Grand Mufti of Syria during a period of high-level opposition.

The CRDC produces video and audio podcasts called "Peace Steps" in which Gopin and Aziz Abu Sarah provide information on positive developments in the Middle East, as well as their analysis of current events.

== Faculty and staff ==
Director
Marc Gopin, Ph.D., James H. Laue Professor of World Religions, Diplomacy and Conflict Resolution

Dr. Gopin, scholar and practitioner in religious peace-building, author of several seminal works in the field of religion and conflict resolution, was appointed chair and director. Gopin brings years of experience and scholarship in the positive (and negative) roles religion can play in conflict. His vision for the center includes education in positive resources for conflict resolution in the world's religions; empowerment of religious leaders in the resolution of conflicts; and a change in the way policymakers approach religious conflicts.

Staff
Joseph Montville, Chair of the Board and Senior Fellow
Hind Kabawat, Director of Interfaith Peacebuilding
Michelle D. Everson, Associate Director
David Trickett, Ph.D., Senior Fellow
Safi Kaskas, Senior Researcher in Islam and Multifaith Reconciliation
Katrien Hertog, Research Fellow
Samuel Rizk, Senior Research Associate
