= Alma Jadallah =

American filmmaker

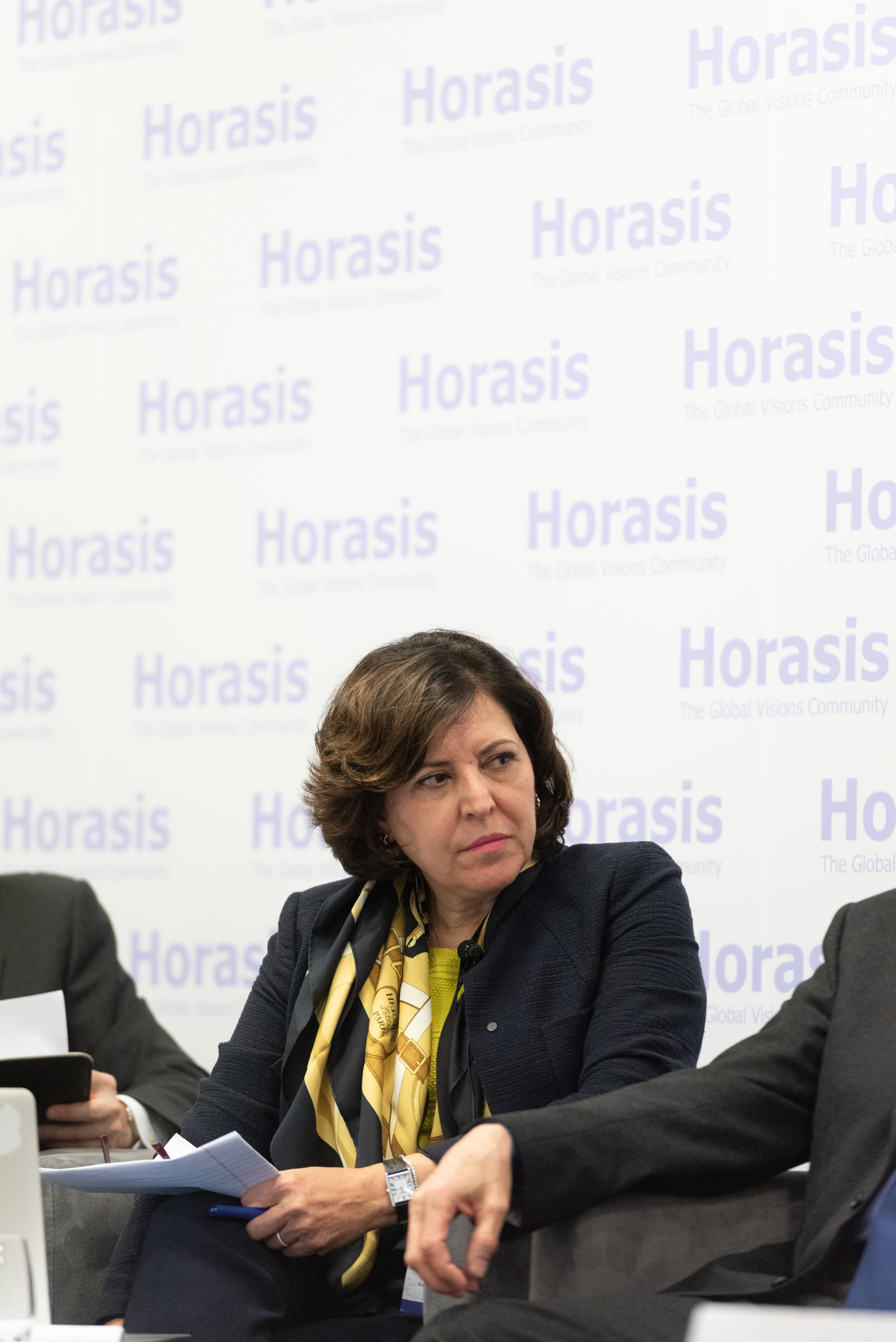
Image of Alma Abdul-Hadi Jadallah

Alma Abdul-Hadi Jadallah, is a social scientist, internationally recognized mediator, facilitator and trainer, as well as a scholar-practitioner and educator with close to twenty years of experience in the field of conflict analysis and resolution, research and applied practice, peacebuilding, conflict prevention, and transformation. Since 2005, she has been the President and Managing Director of Kommon Denominator Inc., a private consulting firm.

== Career ==
As the Founder, President, and Managing Director of Kommon Denominator, Inc., Jadallah manages the day-to-day management and business development of the enterprise, serving clients on the national, international and global level on issues pertaining to social change, peacebuilding and conflict transformation. She has organised training in the theory and practice of conflict resolution theory and skills, conducting assessments, process design and intervention strategies such as dialogue, facilitation, mediation, problem solving, Alternative Dispute Resolution (ADR).

She has provided technical advice and expertise on strategic initiatives aimed at strengthening global, international, national and local capacities in conflict prevention and mitigation strategies. Recent research agenda includes politicized and organized violence (PVE and CVE), a gendered approach on the potential role of women in the Arab world in war and peace, and the role of UN Special Envoys in Yemen. Alma has also designed interventions on issues pertaining to identity-based conflicts, state and non-state actors, gendered approaches to peace and security, violent responses to conflict, security sector reform, and the social dynamics of conflict.

Jadallah is also a part-time faculty member at the School for Conflict Analysis and Resolution, George Mason University, Eastern Mennonite University, and Southern Methodist University.

== Awards ==
- 2017 Distinguished Alumni of the Year, George Mason University.
- 2009 WBE Business Star for the Women Presidents' Educational Organization-DC.
- 2008 Washington, D. C. Region Woman Business Enterprise of the Year, award conferred by the Woman Presidents Education Organization (WPEO).
- 2007 Top 100 Minority Business Award, awarded by the University of Maryland, The Governor's Office for Minority Affairs and the Maryland Chamber of Commerce.
- 2005 Freddie Mac Women Interactive Network Award: Women Changing Freddie Mac. Women influencing Freddie Mac.
- Honors: Member of Pinnacle Honor Society.

== Professional membership and community service ==
Jadallah has served on committees and boards such as the American Friends Service Committee, International Programs (2014–2016), the National Organization for Women (2016); founding member of the Arab Council for Conflict Resolution (2011) and the Institute for Victims of Trauma, McLean, Virginia (1996–).

- Advisor, Smart Security Project, Eastern Mennonite University, Harrisonburg, Virginia, 2008–present.

== Select publications ==
- Jadallah, Alma Abdul Hadi. “Bahrain a Suffocated Civil Society”, Center for International Studies Report on Counter Terrorism Measures and Civil Society. Center for International and Strategic Studies, 2018. (Nov. 2016- July. 2018)
- Jadallah, Alma Abdul Hadi. "Building Resilience in the Middle East Amidst Terror."SCAR Newsletter, Volume 10, Issue 4, Feb. 2016.
- Jadallah, Alma. The Yemeni National Dialogue: Setting a Standard for Other Arab Countries. S-CAR Newsletter, April 2014, Vol. 8, Issue 3.
- Jadallah, Alma and Yasmina Mrabet. Inclusive Peace Processes in the Context of the Palestinian Israeli Conflict. White Paper, 2012.
- Jadallah, Alma. Portrayal of Women in Arab Spring. S-CAR Newsletter, Dec. 11, Vol. 5, Issue 6.
- Hanna Foldes, Michael Cullen, Michelle Wisecarver, Meredith Ferro, Alma Jadallah, and Sena Garven, Negotiation Performance: Antecedents, Outcomes, and Training Recommendations, Technical Report, United States Army Research Institute for the Behavioral and Social Sciences. 2011.
- Jadallah, Alma Abdul Hadi and Rainey, Dan. “The Culture in the Code.” Paper presented at the 4th International Forum on On-line Dispute Resolution, Cairo, Egypt. March, 2009
- Co-author: Wing, et al. (2008) “Framing the Dialogue: Social Justice and Conflict Intervention.” ACResolution

== Media appearances ==
"Bringing People Together", written by Buzz McClain about Alma Abdul-Hadi Jadallah

"Yemen's former president assassinated after his last 'dance on the heads of snakes" radio interview with Alma Abdul-Hadi Jadallah by Stephen Snyder

"Arab Women: Peace Engines At Work! - Dr. Alma Abdul-Hadi Jadallah"
