= Christopher Mitchell (anthropologist) =

British historian

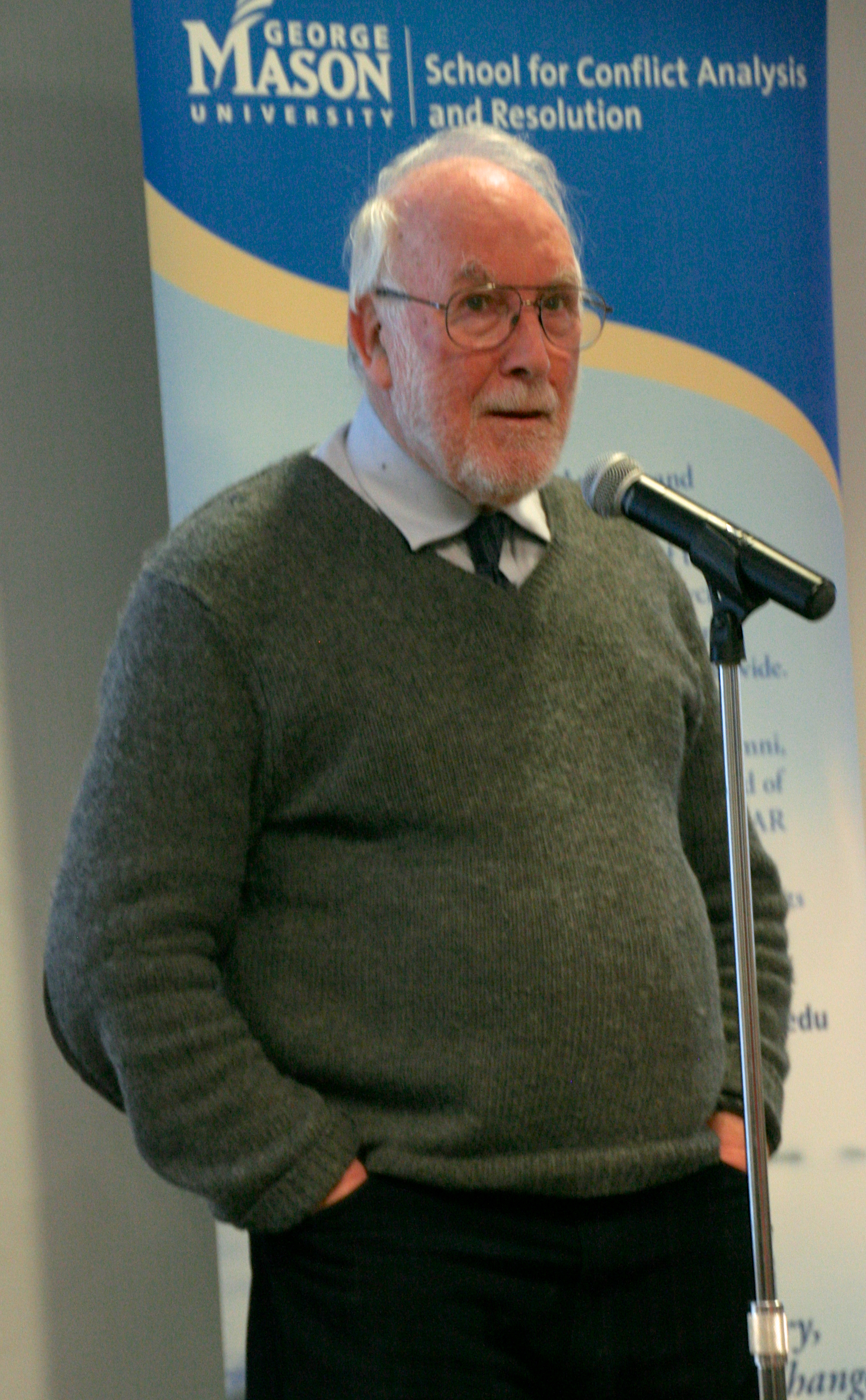
- Christopher Mitchell, 2015
- Education: University College London (PhD)
- Occupations: Academic, author
- Title: Professor Emeritus at the School for Conflict Analysis and Resolution

Christopher Mitchell is a British historian and is Professor Emeritus at the School for Conflict Analysis and Resolution at George Mason University. He possesses degrees in Economics and International Relations from London University.

== Publications ==
- The Nature of Intractable Conflict: Resolution in the Twenty-First Century. Palgrave Macmillan. 2014. ISBN 9781403945181. Archived from the original on 27 February 2015.
- Conflict Resolution and Human Needs: Linking theory and practice. Routledge. 2013. ISBN 9780415629904. Archived from the original on 1 January 2015.
- Local Peacebuilding and National Peace: Interaction Between Grassroots and Elite Processes. Paradigm Publishers. 2012. ISBN 9781441160225. Archived from the original on 2 April 2015.
- Zones of Peace. Stylus Publishing. 2007. ISBN 9781565492332. Archived from the original on 21 March 2015.
- Gestures of Conciliation: Factors Contributing to Successful Olive Branches. St. Martin's Press, Palgrave Macmillan. 2000. ISBN 9780312230524. Archived from the original on 2 April 2015.
- Handbook of Conflict Resolution: The Analytical Problem-Solving Approach. The Continuum International Publishing Group Ltd. 1996. ISBN 9781855672772. Archived from the original on 26 February 2015.
