= Center for Ethical Solutions =

Non-profit bioethics think tank

- Abbreviation: CES
- Type: bioethics think tank
- Headquarters: Lovettsville, VA, United States
- Chairwoman: Sigrid Fry-Revere
- Key people: Shane Steinfeld; Rod Carveth; Michele Battle-Fisher
- Revenue: $28,109 (2015)
- Expenses: $27,076 (2015)

The Center for Ethical Solutions (CES), founded by Sigrid Fry-Revere, is a 501(c)(3) non-profit bioethics think tank based in Lovettsville, Virginia whose mission is to find practical solutions to controversial problems in the field of medical ethics. CES supports research and public education, seeking to achieve its goals through research and developing products including books and documentary films to educate the public. Lobbying and participation in political campaigns are specifically excluded from its activities.

== Projects ==
=== Current projects ===
- Solving the Organ Shortage

CES is studying possible ways to solve the US organ shortage by examining the different organ donation systems in Iran, which has eliminated its country's waiting list for kidneys (a claim contested by some), and Spain, which has the highest rate of organ donation in the world. Beginning in November 2008, Dr. Fry-Revere and Dr. Bahar Bastani, an American-Iranian nephrologist and professor of internal medicine at St. Louis Medical School in Missouri, traveled in Iran for six weeks to collect statistical data as well as testimonies from those involved in the transplant community there. The "Iranian model" involves legalizing compensation for organ donation, and the "Spanish model" involves a comprehensive national procurement system, maintaining positive views of organ donation in the mass media, and proactive donor detection, all coordinated by the National Transplant Organization. While Spain does employ an opt-out system for organ donation, current legislation requires consent from the relatives of the deceased before organs can be donated, and research has suggested that the increased rate of organ donation should be attributed to the actions of the National Transplant Organization and not the legislative approach.
CES is currently creating a documentary film which chronicles the struggles of American Steve Lessin as he negotiates end stage renal disease.

- Meeting the Needs of America's Veterans

Though the project is still in early stages of development, CES intends to study the medical and healthcare needs of American veterans, including reintegration into society, as well as the readiness of the US healthcare system to accommodate the needs of veterans returning from Iraq and Afghanistan. Special attention will be paid to the need for mental health care, as a higher percentage of returning soldiers are experiencing posttraumatic stress disorder than from previous military operations.

- Legal Trends in Bioethics

Starting in the Fall of 2009 CES will publish Legal Trends in Bioethics through its website. Previously a column in the quarterly Journal of Clinical Ethics, Legal Trends tracks developments in the field of bioethics. "Through publication on the Internet, the information provided by the column will be more up-to-date and relevant for anyone interested in tracking legal issues in bioethics." Past editions authored by Sigrid Fry-Revere will also be available through the website.

- Fact Sheets

Quick Facts Sheet on Kidney Disease and the Organ Shortage

Quick Facts Sheet on PTSD (Posttraumatic Stress Disorder) and TBI (Traumatic Brain Injury)

=== Proposed projects ===
- Pain Management

This project explores social attitudes towards and public awareness of the need for pain management with potentially addictive opiates for patients with end-of-life or serious chronic pain.

- Patient Advocacy

CES plans to examine whether patient advocacy can or should be integrated into common healthcare practices. Currently, the private sector offers private advocates who oversee customers' medical care and act as liaisons between patients and healthcare providers, but this service is often financially accessible to only the wealthy.
