= Richard E. Rubenstein =

American historian (born 1938)

Richard E. Rubenstein (born February 24, 1938) is an author and University Professor Emeritus of Conflict Resolution and Public Affairs at George Mason University, holding degrees from Harvard University, Oxford University (as a Rhodes Scholar), and Harvard Law School. Rubenstein is from Woodmere, New York. He lives in Washington, D.C.

== Career ==
Rubenstein was an attorney at Steptoe & Johnson in Washington, DC, and served as assistant director of the Adlai Stevenson Institute of International Affairs in Chicago before becoming associate professor of political science at Roosevelt University (1970–79). In 1976-77 he served as Fulbright Professor at the Universite de Provence (Aix-Marseille I). Returning to Washington, he became professor of law and academic dean at Antioch Law School (1979–87)and then university professor at George Mason University (1987-2023). At George Mason he served as a faculty member and former director of the Jimmy and Rosalynn Carter School for Peace and Conflict Resolution, the nation's oldest and largest conflict studies program. While at the Carter School he spent a sabbatical term teaching at the University of Malta and afterwards was instrumental in creating an international master's program taught jointly by his George Mason colleagues and Maltese professors. The University of Malta awarded him an honorary Litt.D. degree in 2016.

Since the 1960s Rubenstein has been active in movements for peace, equality, and social justice. In Chicago he helped organize protests against the Vietnam War and served as co-chair of the Chicago Peace Action Coalition, He also participated in multiple activities in support of the Black Power and workers' power movements. His writings, both academic and journalistic, have generally focused on analyzing violent social conflicts and exploring the possibilities of resolving them by restructuring failing socioeconomic, cultural, and political systems.

Rubenstein's first book, Rebels in Eden: Mass Violence in the United States, (Little Brown, 1970) interpreted the racial uprisings of the sixties in the context of the history of violent struggles for group autonomy in America. The study was reviewed favorably in TIME magazine (https://time.com/archive/6877163/books-for-better-or-for-worse/) and other national journals. It was followed by Left Turn: Origins of the Next American Revolution, (Little Brown, 1973), an analysis of U.S. politics in light of America's "three class" social system. His next two books focused on terrorism. Alchemists of Revolution: Terrorism in the Modern World (Basic Books, 1986) offered a Marxist explanation of the origins and dynamics of terrorism movements. Comrade Valentine (Harcourt Books, 1993) was a meditation on the life of Yevno Azef, the notorious double agent who organized assassinations of czarist officials in the decade before the Russian Revolution.

Beginning in the late 90s, Rubenstein turned his attention to religious conflict and wrote three books showing why religious disputes become (or don't become) violent. When Jesus Became God: The Struggle to Define Christianity during the Last Days of Rome (Harcourt, 1999), is a best-selling account of the bitter fourth-century battle over Christ's divinity known as the Arian Controversy early Christianity. Aristotle's Children: How Christians, Muslims, and Jews Rediscovered Ancient Wisdom and Illuminated the Middle Ages (Harcourt, 2003), describes how the medieval Catholic Church allowed its thinking to be transformed by the great debate over Aristotelian philosophy and inaugurated Europe's first scientific revolution. And Thus Saith the Lord: The Revolutionary Moral Vision of Isaiah and Jeremiah (Harcourt, 2006), tells how the later Jewish prophets were inspired to develop a new vision of international ethics by reacting to the empires of their day.

In subsequent years the issue of empire continued to inspire Rubenstein's writing. In 2010 his book, Reasons to Kill: Why Americans Choose War (Bloomsbury Press) analyzed the arguments and images that are used to convince Americans that imperialist wars are morally justified. His next work, Resolving Structural Conflicts: How Violent Systems Can Be Transformed (Routledge, 2017), summarized his overall approach to conflict and peace studies, arguing that our most serious, apparently intractable conflicts are generated by social systems themselves, not by malice or misunderstanding, and that resolving them requires reconstructing these systems. This theme and many others are further developed in Conflict Resolution After the Pandemic: Building Peace, Pursuing Justice, an edited work (with Solon Simmons) published by Routledge in 2021.

In addition to these books Rubenstein has produced a steady stream of academic articles, book chapters, and journalistic pieces. He writes regularly on various topics for the online journals CounterPunch and Transcend Media Service. His frequently cited academic articles include "Challenging Huntington" (with Jarle Crocker, Foreign Policy, No. 96, August 1994), a critique of Samuel P. Huntington's "clash of civilizations" theory; "Conflict Resolution and the Structural Sources of Conflict," in Ho Won Jeong, "Conflict Resolution: Dynammics, Processes, Structure" (Routledge, 1999); "Basic Human Needs: The Next Steps in Theory Development," in John Burton, "Conflict: Human Needs Theory" (Macmillan/St. Martin's Press, 1990); and "Conflict Resolution in an Age of Empire: New Challenges to an Emerging Field," in “Conflict Resolution in An Age of Empire: New Challenges to an Emerging Profession,” in Sandole, Byrne, et al., "A Handbook of Conflict Resolution" (Routledge, 2008).

Rubenstein lives with his wife in the Capitol Hill area of Washington, D.C. Their blended family comprises six children, the children's spouses or partners, and six grandchildren. Richard plays jazz piano for recreation and performs occasionally in public. His writings in progress include a study of the political taboos that make systemic conflict resolution difficult or impossible, a memoir about his days in Chicago, and a novel about St. Paul in Malta.

== Selected works ==
- Rebels in Eden: Mass Political Violence in America. Little, Brown. 1970. (Also published in the UK).
- Left Turn: Origins of the Next American Revolution. Little, Brown. 1973. (Also published in the UK).
- Alchemists of 'Revolution: Terrorism in the Modern World. Basic Books. 1987. ISBN 0-465-00095-9.
- Comrade Valentine: The True Story of Azef the Spy. Harcourt. 1994. ISBN 0-15-152895-0. (Also published in Poland).
- When Jesus Became God: The Struggle to Define Christianity During the Last Days of Rome. Harcourt. 2000. (Also published in France, Brazil, Mexico, Korea, and Japan).
- Aristotle's Children: How Christians, Muslims, and Jews Rediscovered Ancient Wisdom and Illuminated the Middle Ages. Harcourt. 2003. ISBN 0-15-100720-9. (Also published in Brazil, Mexico, Korea, Japan, Nationalist China, and Greece).
- Thus Saith the Lord: The Revolutionary Moral Vision of Isaiah and Jeremiah. Harcourt. 2006. ISBN 0-15-101219-9.
- Reasons to Kill: Why Americans Choose War. Bloomsbury Press. 2010. ISBN 9781608190263.
- Resolving Structural Conflicts: How Violent Systems Can Be Transformed. Routledge. 2017. ISBN 9781315665764
- Conflict Resolution After the Pandemic: Building Peace, Pursuing Justice (with Solon Simmons). ISBN 9781003153832.
