= Valery Soyfer =

Valery Nikolayevich Soyfer
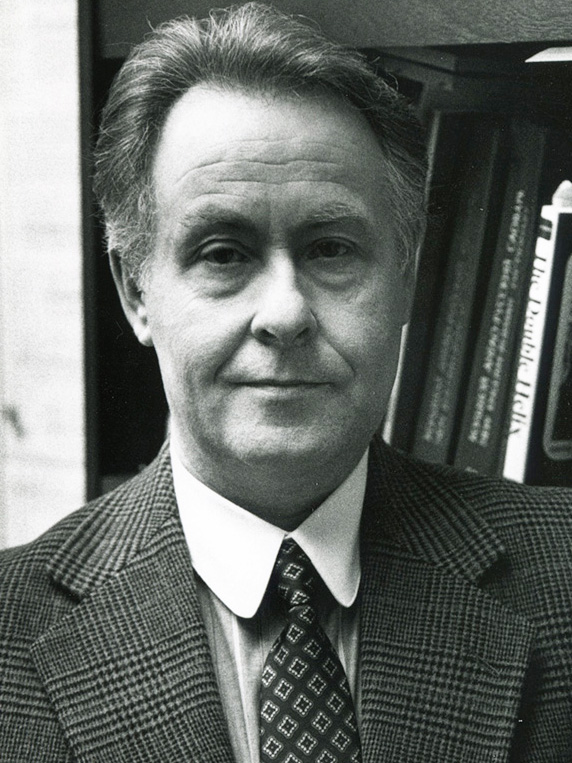
- Born: October 16, 1936; Gorky, USSR (now Nizhny Novgorod, Russia)
- Died: June 11, 2024; Falls Church, Virginia
- Citizenship: US
- Education: Moscow Timiryazev Agricultural Academy; Department of Biophysics, School of Physics, M. V. Lomonosov Moscow State University
- Known for: Action of radiation and chemicals on DNA, DNA repair, triple-helical nucleic acids, history of science
- Spouse: Dr. Nina I. Soyfer, retired Research Professor
- Awards: International Gregor Mendel Medal (1995), Gregor Mendel Medal of Czech Academy of Sciences (1996), Nikolai Vavilov Silver Medal (2002)
- Scientific career
- Fields: Biophysics, molecular genetics, history of science
- Workplaces: George Mason University

Valery Nikolayevich Soyfer (Russian: Валерий Николаевич Сойфер), born in 1936 in Gorky was a Russian-American biophysicist, molecular geneticist, historian of science, human rights advocate, and humanitarian.

== Biography ==
Born in 1936 in Gorky. He graduated from the Moscow Timiryazev Agricultural Academy and the Faculty of Physics of the Lomonosov Moscow State University. He was a foreign member of the National Academy of Sciences of Ukraine, a member of the New York Academy of Sciences, the Russian Academy of Natural Sciences, the Academy of Pedagogical and Social Sciences, and a number of other academies in the world.

In the USSR, he worked at the Kurchatov Institute of Atomic Energy, Institute of Poliomyelitis and Viral Encephalitis, and Institute of General Genetics of the USSR Academy of Sciences. In 1970–1978, was head of Laboratory of Molecular Genetics of the USSR Lenin Academy of Agricultural Sciences (Vaskhnill), in 1974–1978 – scientific director of the All-Union Research Institute for Applied Molecular Biology and Genetics (he was the creator of this institution). In 1976, became involved in human rights advocacy, was fired from his scientific positions on December 31, 1978. His Soviet citizenship was stripped in 1988 and he emigrated to the United States in the same year.

From 1988 to 1990, was a distinguished university visiting professor in the Department of Molecular Genetics and the Center of Biotechnology of Ohio State University in Columbus. From 1990 to 993, he was Clarence Robinson Professor and in 1993–2016 is the distinguished university professor at George Mason University, and in 1990–2015 – director of the Laboratory of Molecular Genetics at this university.

He has published 35 books (25 in Russia, 6 in the US and England, 1 in Germany, 1 in Vietnam, 1 in Estonia and 1 in Czech Republic). Almost 350 scientific articles published in international and national journals and collective monographs (118 of them in English; 4 in German, 4 in French, 2 in Swedish, 2 in Lithuanian, 2 in Czech, the rest in Russian); 45 articles in encyclopedias (4 of them in English). Almost 60 scientific-popular articles published in Russian, English, German, French and Spanish. More than 100 abstracts were presented at national and international conferences, symposia and congresses (37 of them in English). Almost 60 articles appeared in newspapers, including The Washington Post, The New York Times, The Los Angeles Times, The Baltimore Sun, The Chicago Tribune, El País, Figaro, Izvestiya, Nezavisimaya Gazeta, Rossiyskaya Gazeta, Kommersant and others.

== Awards and accolades ==
Valery Soyfer was awarded the International Gregor Mendel medal for outstanding achievement in biology in 1995, with the Gregor Mendel medal of the Czech Academy of Sciences in 1996, was elected as an honorary professor of the Siberian Branch of the Russian Academy of Sciences for “An Outstanding Contribution to Science and for Development of International Cooperation” in 2001, and won the Nikolai Vavilov Silver Medal in 2002. He was an Honorary Member of the Hebrew University of Jerusalem (1983), Honorary Doctor at Kazan State University (1996), and Honorary Professor at Lomonosov Moscow State University (2003), and Rostov State (now South Federal) University (2003).

== Personal ==
Valery Soyfer was born in a Russian-Jewish family. Father – Nikolai Ilyich Soyfer (1898–1950) was a journalist and newspaper editor, mother – Anna Alexandrovna Kuznetsova (1902–1975). Valery married Nina I. Yakovleva in 1961, she graduated as a Medical Doctor (M.D.) from the first Moscow Medical Institute (Academy), later specializing in biochemistry and worked together with her husband for 35 years from 1963 until 1998. They have two children, Marina (born in 1963) and Vladimir (born in 1965) and five grandchildren. Valery's brother Vladimir (1930–2016) was a nuclear physicist and developed the most sensitive method of measuring radioactivity in oceans and underground water. More of Soyfer's family history is depicted in his "Very Personal Book (2011, Novosibirsk)".

== Scientific research ==
Most of Valery Soyfer's scientific works were devoted to the study of radiation and chemical DNA damage, the molecular mechanisms of mutagenesis, the role of damage of structure of double-stranded and triple-stranded DNA. He discovered the mechanisms of DNA repair in higher plants and proved the role of DNA repair in the rate of mutations in microorganisms and plants. Has had significant contributions to the study of history of biology and the suppression of genetic and cell biology due to political reasons in the Soviet Union.

Dr. Soyfer studied comparative anatomy of seeds of representatives of Cucurbitaceae L. (Juss.) family as an evolutionary indicator For this work he was awarded with the 1st prize at the annual competition of scientific works of students of Moscow Timiryazev Agricultural Academy. This work was defended later as the Ph.D. dissertation in biology. See also review in Kew Bulletin.

From 1963 until 1966, he studied the mutagenesis of T2 bacteriophage at high doses of UV and gamma irradiation., He also studied the phenomenon of the maximum of frequency of mutations at high doses of radiation and suggested an explanation for this phenomenon based on the consecutive damage of nucleotide codons in the genes.

He presented the first proof for excision repair in human cells as well as received the first evidence of the process of excision repair in higher plants. He presented the first data regarding reparative DNA synthesis in the gaps formed after excision of damaged regions of DNA in higher plants, studied the participation of single-strand and double strand breaks of bacterial DNA in induction of mutations by radiation and chemical mutagens, found the first evidence that induction of chromatid and chromosomal aberrations in higher plants is triggered by single-strand and double strand breaks in plant DNA after DNA damaging by radiation and chemical mutagens, studied the role of mistakes of repair enzymes in induction of genic mutations in bacteria and bacteriophages, developed a new method (photofootprinting) for detection of DNA triplexes (in collaboration with Maxim Frank-Kamenetskii), studied the stabilization of DNA triplexes by divalent cations, and the application of chromatography for the study of DNA triplexes

Dr. Soyfer also studied the genetic consequences of the Chernobyl catastrophe, as well as human DNA damage of residents of the radioactively contaminated area of Chelyabinsk in Russia.

Soyfer published several monographs in the fields that he investigated: “Biophysics” (translation by V. Soyfer and V. Otroshchenko from English into Russian, 1964, Moscow), “Molecular Mechanisms of Mutagenesis” (1970, Moscow), "Chemical Basis of Mutation" (1975, New York), “Die Molekulare Mechanismen der Mutagenese und Reparatur” (1976. Berlin), Science Behind Iron Curtains. (1990, London), “Triple Helical Nucleic Acids” (in co-authorship with V. N. Potaman, 1995, New York-London-Heidelberg; reprinted in 2012).

== Studies in history of science ==
Dr. Soyfer studied the history of genetics, molecular biology and molecular genetics, cellular theory, the role of politicization of science and the totalitarian control of science in the USSR. He published many works in these fields, including articles in Nature (London), Nature Reviews/Genetics, Genetics, Studies in the History of Biology, and books "Essays on History of Molecular Genetics", "The State and Science", "Lysenko and the tragedy of Soviet Science", "Communist Regime and Science", "Rudá Biologie (Pseudověda v SSSR)" and "Stalin and Fraudulent Scientists.

== Articles in encyclopedias ==
Almost 50 articles were published by Soyfer in the Great Soviet Encyclopedia (3rd edition), Medical Encyclopedia and Popular Medical Encyclopedia in 1970-1983. In 2000-2001, he served as the Editor-in-Chief and the author of the 10 volume Encyclopedia of Contemporary Natural Sciences, 1999-2001, Moscow (the encyclopedia consists of the following volumes: “Physical Chemistry”, “General Biology”, “Mathematics and Mechanics”, “Physics of Elementary Particles. Astrophysics”, “Physics of Condensed Matter”, “General Chemistry”, “ Physics of Wave Processes”, “Molecular Mechanisms of Biological Processes”, “Earth Sciences” and “Modern Technologies”).

== Scientific-popular works ==
During his scientific career, Soyfer paid special attention to the popularization of the successes of modern science and published many articles and books. Among them was the first book on genetics in the USSR (after the nearly 25-year ban on genetics established in the USSR by Joseph Stalin) "Arithmetic of Heredity" (1969, translated into Estonian in 1973), "Repair Systems of Cells" (1970, translated into Vietnamese in 1971), "Contemporary Problems of Biology" (1974), "Molecules of Living Cells" (1975), "Lenin’s Ghost Adopted Him (A Documentary Thriller about One Lenin Prize Laureate and Soviet Geneticists)" (2006), "By Personal Order of Comrade Stalin" (2007) and others. Soyfer organized the Soros Educational Journal (In Russian and Georgian) in which from 1995 to 2003 Soros Professors published their reviews on contemporary achievements in basic sciences (73 issues, published monthly, circulation 40,000 copies, distributed free of charge in all high schools and universities and published online).

== Human right support ==
From 1975, Soyfer joined those intellectuals in the USSR who were involved in loosening of strict political control of the life of society and who advocated the establishment of more democratic principles in the country. The Soviet authorities, after recognizing Soyfer's participation in this activity, first removed him from his position as Scientific Director of his institute in 1976, then dismissed him from his chairmanship of his Laboratory a year later. From 1978, he became jobless. In 1981, he became a member of the USSR branch of “Amnesty International” (1985-1988 was a chairman of this organization). Together with writer Georgi Vladimov, Andrei Sakharov's wife, Yelena Bonner, USSR Chess champion Boris Gulko, he signed many petitions to Soviet and international leaders and organizations in support of political prisoners Anatoly Shcharansky, Yuri Orlov, Sergei Kovalev and others. He forwarded personal letters with requests for the democratization of life in the USSR to Mikhail Gorbachev and to Congresses of the CPSU. In his apartment in Moscow, Soyfer organized meetings with Western ambassadors and diplomats to Moscow (US Ambassador Arthur Hartman, Great Britain cultural attache John Gordon, the Netherlands Ambassadors Van Akht and Peter Buwalda, Malta Ambassador Giuseppe Schembri and others), as well as legislators from many Countries (Jack Kemp, Edward Kennedy, Al D'Amato, Arlen Specter and others), as well as United States Deputy Secretary of State Paul Wolfowitz and Assistant Secretary of State for Human Rights and Humanitarian Affairs Richard Schifter. Beginning in 1986, Ronald Reagan appealed to Mikhail Gorbachev several times to grant Soyfer and his family permission to emigrate to the United States, with his appeal granted after the third attempt, when Soyfer received the opportunity to accept invitations from several US Universities and arrived in the United States on May 1, 1988.

== Humanitarian activity ==
Starting in 1987, Soyfer participated in humanitarian activity. He supported the actions of the American financier and philanthropist, George Soros, in support of Russian intellectuals and became a member of the Board of Directors of the International Science Foundation (ISF) in 1992-1995 and the chairman of the board and the General Director of the International Soros Science Education Program (ISSEP) in 1994–2004. These programs supported financially more than 120,000 scientists, professors and teachers in the countries of the former USSR, more than 880,000 high school students took part in the Soros Olympiads. The results achieved by these organizations are described in Soyfer's books "Intellectual Elite and Philanthropy (Ten years of the International Soros Science Education Program)" (2004, Moscow) and "How George Soros Saved Soviet Scientists and Teachers and What America Can Learn From the Experience" (2014. KDP Publishing).

== Articles referring to Valery Soyfer ==
- Whitney, Craig R. 1980. Soviet Scientist, Labeled as a Jew, Says Life Wilts., The New York Times. October 1. (In English).
- Hoagland, Jim. 1987. Loosening The Chains. The Washington Post, 31 July. (In English).
- Lewis, Anthony. 1988. Even Sceptics Applaud The Changes. The New York Times, June 2 (reprinted in The International Bulletin Tribune, June 3).
- Stone, Richard. 1996. Bringing Research and Teaching Back Together. Science, February 2, v. 271, p. 699-701. (In English).
- Demidov, Vadim V. 2002. Scientist, Historian, Educator and Humanist: Valery N. Soyfer at His 65th Anniversary. Journal of Biomolecular Structure and Dynamics, vol. 19, No. 6, pp. 7–8 (In English).
