= Richard Bausch =

American novelist and short story writer

- Born: April 18, 1945 (age 81); Fort Benning, Georgia, U.S.
- Education: George Mason University (BA); Iowa Writers' Workshop (MFA)
- Occupations: Novelist; short story writer
- Relatives: Robert Bausch (brother)

Richard Bausch (born April 18, 1945) is an American novelist, short story writer, and professor in the writing program at Chapman University in Orange, California. He has published thirteen novels, ten short story collections, and one volume of poetry and prose.

He joined with the writer and editor Ronald Verlin Cassill to bring out the 6th edition of The Norton Anthology of Short Fiction. Since Cassill's death in 2002, he has been the sole editor of that anthology, bringing out the 7th and 8th editions.

== Early life and education ==
Bausch was born in 1945 in Fort Benning, Georgia. He is the twin brother of author Robert Bausch.

He served in the U.S. Air Force between 1966 and 1969, and toured the Midwest and South singing in a rock band, doing stand-up comedy, and writing poetry. He holds a B.A. from George Mason University, and an M.F.A. from the Iowa Writers' Workshop. Since 1974, he has taught English and Creative Writing at the University of Iowa, George Mason University, the University of Memphis, the University of Tennessee, Beloit College, Stanford University, and Chapman University. He was previously Heritage Chair in Writing at George Mason University; and Moss Chair of Excellence in the Writing Program at the University of Memphis. He now lives in Orange, California.

== Writing ==
Bausch's novels and stories vary from explorations of fear and love in family life, to novels with historical backdrops, including Rebel Powers (1993), Good Evening Mr. & Mrs. America, and All the Ships at Sea (1996), Hello to the Cannibals (2002), and Peace (2008). He published his first short story in The Atlantic in April 1983: "All the Way in Flagstaff, Arizona" was initially an 800-page novel that he cut down, calling the process "like passing a kidney stone". He is a contributor of short stories to various periodicals, including The Atlantic Monthly, Esquire, Harper's, The New Yorker, Playboy, Ploughshares, Narrative, and The Southern Review. His work has also been represented in anthologies, including O. Henry Prize Stories and The Best American Short Stories.

== Awards ==
Bausch received a National Endowment for the Arts grant in 1982, a Guggenheim Fellowship in 1984, the Hillsdale Prize of the Fellowship of Southern Writers in 1991, the Lila Wallace-Reader's Digest Writers' Award in 1992, the American Academy of Arts and Letters' Award in Literature in 1993, and was elected to the Fellowship of Southern Writers in 1995. (He served as chancellor of the Fellowship from 2007 to 2010.) His novel, Take Me Back (1982) and his first story collection, Spirits and Other Stories (1987), were nominated for the PEN/Faulkner Award. Two of his short stories, "The Man Who Knew Belle Star" and "Letter to the Lady of the House", won the National Magazine Award in fiction for The Atlantic Monthly and The New Yorker, respectively. In 2004, he won the PEN/Malamud Award for Short Story Excellence. His novel Peace won the 2009 Dayton Literary Peace Prize. and the W. Y. Boyd Literary Award for Excellence in Military Fiction of the American Library Association. Bausch was the 2012 winner of the $30,000 Rea Award for his work in the short story.

== Publications ==
=== Novels ===
- Real Presence, 1980
- Take Me Back, 1981
- The Last Good Time, 1984
- Mr. Field's Daughter, 1989
- Violence, 1992.
- Rebel Powers, 1993
- Good Evening Mr. and Mrs. America, and All the Ships at Sea, 1996
- In the Night Season, 1998
- Hello to the Cannibals, 2002
- Thanksgiving Night, 2006
- Peace, 2008
- Before, During, After, 2014
- Playhouse, 2023

=== Short fiction ===
- Spirits and Other Stories, 1987
- The Fireman's Wife and Other Stories, 1990
- Rare & Endangered Species, 1994
- Selected Stories of Richard Bausch (The Modern Library), 1996
- Someone to Watch Over Me: Stories, 1999
- The Stories of Richard Bausch, 2003
- Wives & Lovers: 3 Short Novels, 2004
- Something Is Out There, 2010
- Living in the Weather of the World, April 2017
- The Fate of Others: Stories, 2025

=== Collection ===
- These Extremes, Louisiana State University Press, 2009

=== Anthologies edited ===
- The Norton Anthology of Short Fiction, 6th edition (with Ronald Verlin Cassill)
- The Norton Anthology of Short Fiction, 7th edition, 2005
- The Norton Anthology of Short Fiction, 8th edition, 2015

== Film adaptations ==
To date, three feature films have been made from Bausch's work: The Last Good Time, in 1994, adapted by Bob Balaban from Bausch's novel of that title; Endangered Species, in 2017, adapted from six Bausch stories by French director Gilles Bourdos, and Recon, in 2019, adapted by Robert David Port, from Bausch's novel Peace. A fourth film is in progress, adapted by Julie Lipson, from the Bausch story "The Man Who Knew Belle Starr."
