= Saskia Popescu =

Infectious disease epidemiologist

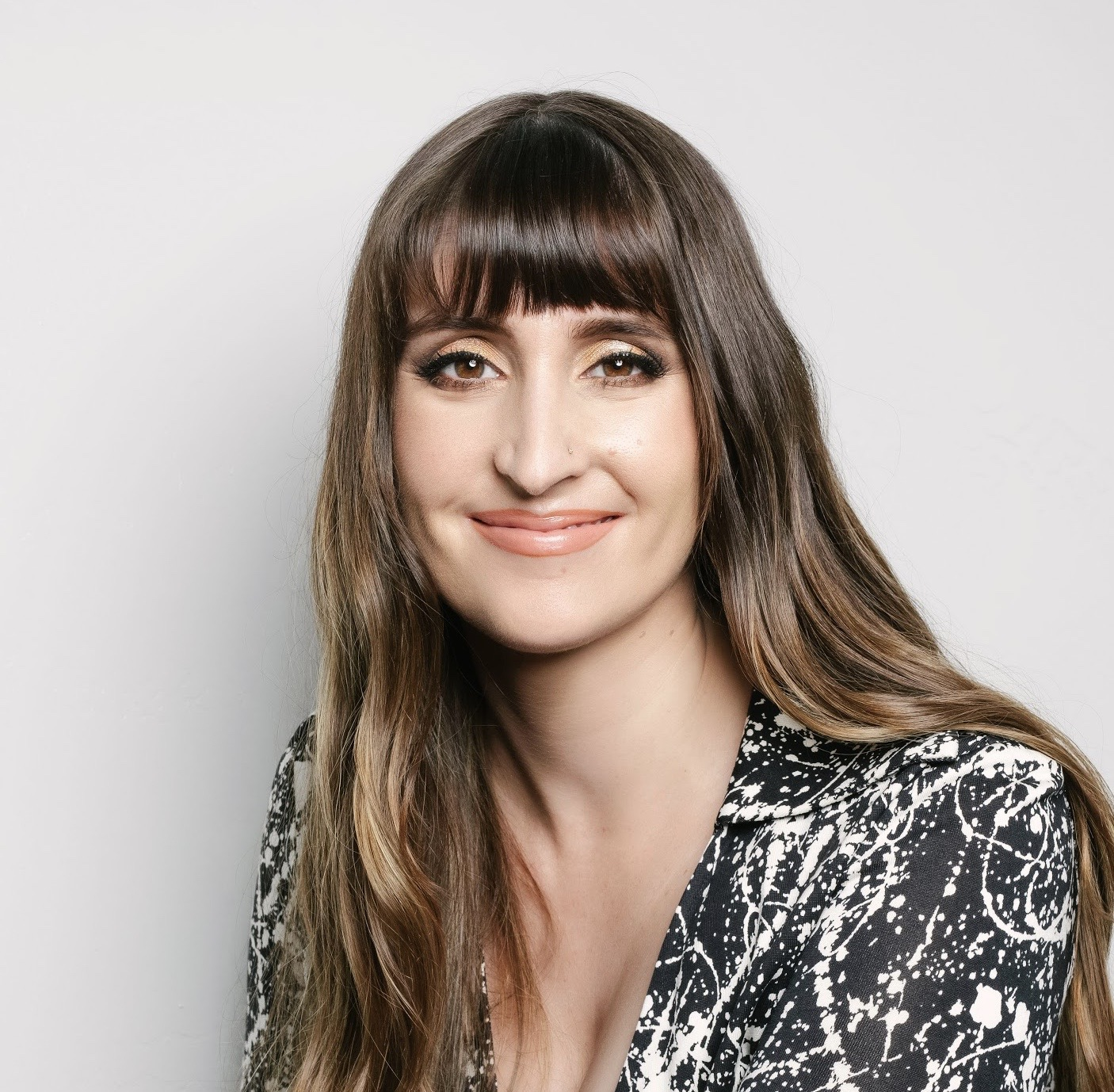
- Education: University of Arizona (BA, Classics; MPH, Public health; MA, International security); George Mason University (PhD, Biodefense)
- Occupations: Global health security and pathogen preparedness expert, infectious disease epidemiologist
- Scientific career
- Fields: Epidemiology, Biosecurity, Biodefense, International security
- Workplaces: University of Arizona, George Mason University’s Schar School of Policy and Government
- Thesis: How Cost Containment Undermines Disease Containment: Political and Economic Obstacles to Investing in Infection Prevention and Control (2019)

Saskia Popescu is an infectious disease epidemiologist and global health security expert in Phoenix, Arizona. She is an Assistant Professor of epidemiology at the University of Maryland, and holds academic appointments at the University of Arizona and George Mason University’s Schar School of Policy and Government, where she lectures on biopreparedness and outbreak response. Since the start of the Coronavirus disease 2019 pandemic, Popescu has worked to prepare for and mitigate the spread of the disease within healthcare and the entertainment industry, where she led the global epidemiology and infection prevention response for Netflix. She has been recognized for her communication efforts around the pandemic, as well as her work on the front lines in infection prevention and healthcare biopreparedness. Popescu currently is a Policy Researcher at RAND Corporation and Helena, addressing converging biological risks from biological weapons nonproliferation, biosecurity, emerging infectious diseases and ecological security, biopreparedness in private industry, and global health security vulnerabilities.

== Education ==
Popescu received her Bachelor of Arts degree in classics from the University of Arizona in 2008. Her senior thesis evaluated the impact of infectious disease on the fall of the Roman Empire. She then attended the University of Arizona Mel and Enid Zuckerman College of Public Health for graduate school, receiving her Master of Public Health degree in infectious disease epidemiology 2011. Following this, she received a Master of Arts in International Security Studies in 2013 from the University of Arizona. Popescu then attended a graduate program at George Mason University to pursue her doctoral degree in biodefense. There, her research centered on global health security. Her doctoral dissertation centered on the economic and political roadblocks for the utilization of infection prevention efforts in the United States. During her graduate work, she was recognized by the Johns Hopkins Center for Health Security as an Emerging Leader in Biosecurity Initiative fellow.

== Career ==
Popescu's research centers on pandemic preparedness and global health security, working to prepare hospitals and advising policymakers for outbreaks of infectious diseases. She is an assistant professor at the Schar School of Policy and Government at George Mason University and an adjunct professor at the University of Arizona teaching biodefense. In 2015, she was involved in the response to an outbreak of measles in Maricopa County, Arizona and is currently involved in the response to Coronavirus disease 2019. In January 2020, before COVID-19 cases spiked in the United States, she warned of the consequences for cutting funding for hospitals that are equipped to respond to infectious disease outbreaks based on her research studying failures in pandemic response. Popescu is a biosecurity and defense/political science Policy Researcher at RAND Corporation and previous consulted for the World Health Organization on COVID-19 Infection Prevention.

=== COVID-19 Pandemic ===
Since the beginning of the COVID-19 pandemic in the United States, Popescu has been working to prepare hospitals for cases of COVID-19 and communicating about the disease to the public through a number of channels. Popescu has worked within Arizona hospital systems to better prepare the hospital system for a surge in COVID-19 cases and advised public health officials on mitigation approaches. She serves on several national committees to monitor and respond to COVID-19, including the National Academies of Sciences, Engineering, and Medicine's Committee on Data Needs to Monitor the Evolution of SARS-CoV-2 and the Federation of American Scientists' Coronavirus Task Force. She frequently published on transmission dynamics and roadblocks in prevention. In 2023, she was part of the research team working in COVID origins analysis, publishing data from the Huanan market regarding zoonotic origins of the virus. Popescu served as the lead epidemiologist and infection preventionist for Netflix during the pandemic, building global response plans and mitigation strategies on productions.

Popescu has also leveraged social media as a tool to communicate information about the pandemic and has been noted as a top expert to follow for reliable information. Her writing has also appeared in popular news outlets, including an Op-ed published in July in The Washington Post outlining how Arizona became a COVID-19 hotspot by not following the measures recommended by epidemiologists and public health officials. Popescu has also co-authored Op-eds on vaccine passports and COVID origins. She also co-authored an editorial for The New York Times with Ezekiel Emanuel and James Phillips outlining a strategy to safely reopen schools. She and Phillips have also developed a color-coded chart to better help members of the public navigate risk around COVID-19 and make better-informed decisions about which activities to partake in. She has also spoken about the gender disparity in experts included in coverage around the pandemic, noting that men with less expertise are often cited more than women.

=== Global Health Security ===
Prior to and following the COVID-19 pandemic, Popescu worked to address vulnerabilities within global health security, specifically in infection prevention infrastructure and biodefense, as well as biological weapons attribution capacity and outbreak response. She has written on the importance of bridging communities to combat gaps in biosecurity governance and supported the presence of non-governmental organizations (NGO) within the Biological Weapons Convention. Popescu has warned of the vulnerabilities to antimicrobial resistance and the importance of addressing private industry resilience and readiness for biological threats, including commercial space, entertainment, and biotechnology.

== Awards and honors ==
- Emerging Leaders in Biosecurity Fellowship, Johns Hopkins Center for Health Security, 2017
- Term Member, Council on Foreign Relations
