= Susan Hirsch =

Legal anthropologist

Susan F. Hirsch is a legal anthropologist whose work has specialized in the study of legal language. She is a professor of conflict resolution and anthropology at George Mason University, where she holds the Vernon M. and Minnie I. Lynch Chair in the Jimmy and Rosalynn Carter School for Peace and Conflict Resolution.

Hirsch is a graduate of Yale University, and has a PhD in anthropology from Duke University. She has served as editor of the Political and Legal Anthropology Review and as president of the Association for Political and Legal Anthropology.

== Books ==
Hirsch's first book, Pronouncing and Persevering, focused on men's and women's language in coastal Kenyan courts. She demonstrated how women's language in court was influencing social change there, because the courts allowed prototypical women's stories to be heard in a new way. She uses detailed language analysis to show this, drawing on linguistic anthropology.

Her second book In Moment of Greatest Calamity, uses linguistic anthropological analysis but also first-person experience to describe her experience as the widow of a victim of 1998 United States embassy bombings in Tanzania—and as a participant and observer of the subsequent trial of the suspected bombers. It won the 2007 Herbert Jacobs Book Prize of the Law & Society Association.

She is also the coauthor, with E. Franklin Dukes, of Mountaintop Mining in Appalachia.
