= Nadine Meyer =

American poet

- Education: Johns Hopkins University (BA); George Mason University (MFA); University of Missouri (PhD)
- Occupation: Poet

Nadine Sabra Meyer is an American poet.

== Life ==
Nadine Meyer grew up in Baltimore, MD, where she earned a B.A. in Writing Seminars from the Johns Hopkins University. She earned her M.F.A. from George Mason University and a Ph.D. in English and Creative Writing from the University of Missouri, Columbia. Her forthcoming book of poems, entitled Chrysanthemum, Chrysanthemum, won the Green Rose Prize and will be published by New Issues Poetry and Prose in spring 2017. Her first book of poems, The Anatomy Theater, won the National Poetry Series, and was published by HarperCollins. Her poems have won the New Letters Prize for Poetry, the Meridian Editor's Prize, and a Pushcart Prize. Nadine is currently an Associate Professor of English and Creative Writing at Gettysburg College.

She graduated from Johns Hopkins University, George Mason University, and the University of Missouri.

Her work has appeared in Chelsea, Quarterly West, Notre Dame Review, North American Review, Pleiades, Southern Poetry Review, and Mississippi Review.

== Awards ==
- 2016 Green Rose Prize for Poetry
- 2011 Meridian Editor's Prize for Poetry
- 2005 National Poetry Series
- 2005 New Letters Prize for Poetry
- Pushcart Prize

== Works ==
- Chrysanthemum, Chrysanthemum, forthcoming with New Issues Poetry and Prose spring 2017
- The Anatomy Theater HarperCollins. 2006. ISBN 978-0-06-112217-0
- Paper houses: poems. George Mason University. 2002.

=== Anthologies ===
- Bill Henderson, ed. (2004). The Pushcart Prize XXIX 2005: Best of the Small Presses. W. W. Norton & Company Limited. ISBN 978-1-888889-39-0.
- Bill Henderson, ed. (1999). The Pushcart prize XXX, 2006: best of the small presses. Pushcart Press. ISBN 978-1-888889-19-2.
