= Martin Andrew Taylor =

- Born: Kansas City Missouri, United States
- Education: George Mason University
- Occupations: President, Vista Consulting Group
- Website: Staff Bio at vistaequitypartners.com

Martin Andrew Taylor is an Operating Principal at Vista Equity Partners, as well as the President of Vista Consulting Group. He was the former senior executive Corporate Vice President of Windows Live and MSN at Microsoft, acting as Steve Ballmer’s Chief of Staff for many years.

== Life ==
He attended George Mason University as an Economics major in Fairfax, Virginia.

=== Microsoft ===
Taylor joined Microsoft in 1993 and rose to head of its Caribbean subsidiary. During this period, Taylor worked closely on several occasions with Steve Ballmer. In 2002, Taylor was hired as Ballmer’s chief of staff. Later, he was named director of business strategy and contributed to the reorganization of Microsoft into seven business groups.

In 2003, he became head of the team to steer Microsoft's David-and-Goliath battle against Linux. He spent the next several years helping redevelop Microsoft Windows software to better compete with Linux. His work to start a marketing campaign called “Get the Facts”. The campaign mainly focused on cost of ownership, but later included security, reliability, and interoperability.

In March 2006, he was hired as corporate vice president of Windows Live and MSN marketing, and oversaw the creation of Windows Live Messenger (formally MSN Messenger) and the testing of over 20 new Windows Live services.

In June 2006, just few months after the first official announcement of Windows Live and only days before the release of Windows Live Messenger 8.0, Microsoft announced they were "parting ways" with Taylor.

=== Vista Partners ===
In December 2006, Taylor joined Vista Equity Partners.
