= Will Seippel =

American businessman

- Born: William H. Seippel; 1957 (age 68–69); United States
- Education: George Mason University and American University
- Occupation: Businessman
- Known for: Business turnaround specialist, business founder and the 2004 IRS tax shelter controversy

Will Seippel is an American business executive, turnaround specialist, and company founder. He is also an active donor, with primary support efforts going to Make a Wish Foundation and George Mason University, where he received the Distinguished Alumni Award in 2009.

== Early life and education ==
Seippel grew up in a small Southern town in the United States. He obtained a bachelor's degree in science from George Mason University and a master's degree in business administration from American University.

== Career ==
Prior to founding WorthPoint, Seippel served as executives to multiple corporations and as a consultant to various boards of directors on mergers and acquisitions.

- Board of directors, chief financial officer and chief operating officer for Digital Commerce Corporation.
- Chief financial officer for Landmark Graphics Corporation

He played a leading role in structuring transactions that raised $5 billion in capital, two of which received the prestigious Institutional Investor Deal of the Year award. One of these transactions included the launching of the first Euro denominated bond for the first European fiber loop, Hermes Europe Railtel. Seippel also listed three companies on the NASDAQ; two of them involved initial public offerings.

Seippel later became the founder, chief executive officer and chairman of Worthpoint Corporation. Worthpoint is Seippel's first startup, which he describes as a company "... on its way to becoming the Bloomberg of the world's antiques and collectibles industry".

=== 2004 IRS tax shelter controversy ===
Seippel also is known for the 2004 IRS tax shelter controversy and subsequent case Seippel v. Jenkens & Gilchrist against the Sidley Austin Brown & Wood law firm. In this action, Seippel was successful in demonstrating that the defendants misrepresented the nature of the tax product they sold to him (the Cobra tax strategy in 1999). Subsequently, Seippel prepared to file suit against the IRS for attempting to wrongfully impose excessive interest and penalties against him, but the IRS withdrew its action, and the suit was never filed.

== Philanthropy ==
Seippel has received various awards for his contributions, including the Distinguished Alumni Award from George Mason University and the Business School's Alumni of the Year award in 2009. He currently serves as chairman of the advisory board for the School of Management at George Mason University.
