= Angela Orebaugh =

American computer scientist and author

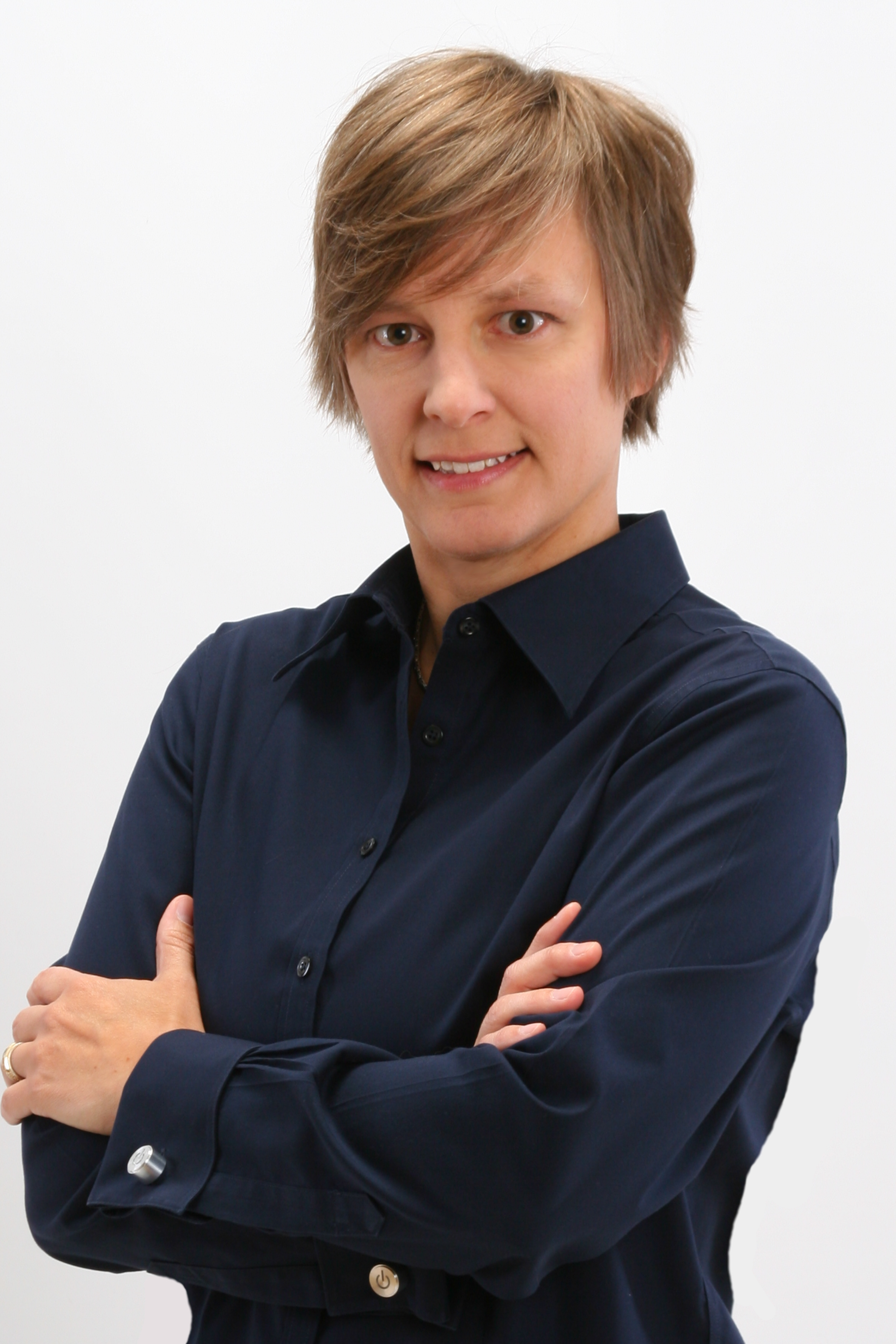
- Education: James Madison University (BS, MS); Harvard University (ALM); George Mason University (PhD)
- Known for: Cybersecurity
- Website: www.tomorrow-today.com

Angela Orebaugh is a cyber technology and security author and researcher. In 2011, she was selected as Booz Allen Hamilton's first Cybersecurity Fellow. She is an assistant professor at the University of Virginia Department of Computer Science. At the University of Virginia she developed a new computer science course teaching students how to design and use technology for positive advancements.

== Education ==
Orebaugh received undergraduate and masters degrees from James Madison University, completing the masters in 1999. She completed a PhD at George Mason University in 2014 under the direction of Jeremy Allnutt and Jason Kinser. Her thesis title was Analyzing Instant Messaging Writeprints as a Behavioral Biometric Element of Cybercrime Investigations.

== Works ==
Books

- Orebaugh, A. et al. Nmap in the Enterprise, Syngress Publishing, ISBN 978-1-59749-241-6, 2008.
- Orebaugh, A. et al. How to Cheat at Configuring Open Source Security Tools , Syngress Publishing, ISBN 978-1-59749-170-9, 2007.
- Orebaugh, A. et al. Wireshark & Ethereal Network Protocol Analyzer Toolkit, Syngress Publishing, ISBN 978-1-59749-073-3, 2006.
- Orebaugh, A., Biles, S., Babbin, J., Snort Cookbook, OReilly Publishing, ISBN 0-596-00791-4, 2005.
- Orebaugh, A., Rash, M., Babbin, J. and Pinkard, B., Intrusion Prevention and Active Response: Deploying Network and Host IPS, Syngress Publishing, ISBN 978-1-932266-47-4, 2005.
- Orebaugh, A., Ethereal Packet Sniffing, Syngress Publishing, Boston, MA., ISBN 1-932266-82-8, 2004.

NIST Publications

- NIST Information Security Continuous Monitoring (ISCM) for Federal Information Systems and Organizations. Special Publication 800-137, 2011.
- NIST Technical Guide to Information Security Testing and Assessment, Special Publication 800-115, 2008.
- NIST Guide to SSL VPNs, Special Publication 800-113, 2008.
- NIST Guide to IPSEC VPNs. Special Publication 800-77, 2005.

Article

- "Ethical challenges of the Internet of Things". SC Magazine. January 29, 2014., (with Ed Covert)
