= Negar Assari =

Iranian artist

Negar Assari-Samimi (Persian: نگار آثاری صمیمی, born 1970) is a painter, photographer, sculptor, and visual artist.

== Life ==
She was born in Tehran, Iran. She graduated with a Bachelor of Arts from the College of Art and Architecture (Tehran) with a concentration in Educational Visual Communication in 1993. After moving to the United States in 1994, she earned a master's degree in Visual Information Technology from George Mason University, Fairfax, VA in 1997.

Assari is the cover artist and contributor for The Poetry Of Iranian Women an anthology of contemporary poems edited by Sheema Kalbasi. She is also the cover designer for Mihan's Future and Four Springs, two collections of poetry by Partow B. Nooriala as well as two of Fereidoun Farahandouz's poetry CDs - Sedaaye Eshgh (The Voice Of Love) and Faryaad dar Baad (Cry In The Wind). She was the Invited Artist and promotional poster designer for the Art and Material Culture of Iranian Shiism Conference at the University of Oxford in July 2006. In 2007, Assari created the theme poster for the Iranian Women's Studies Foundation (IWSF)18th Annual International Conference, which was held June 29-July 1, 2007 at the University of Maryland, College Park campus. She also designed the theme poster for the Rumi International Conference held September 28–30, 2007, also at the University of Maryland, College Park campus.

She has appeared several times as an in-studio guest on Voice of America, speaking in Persian to Iranian/Persian communities on issues of art and culture. She frequently contributes artwork and text to Iranian.com. She lives near Washington, DC with her husband and three children.

== Works ==
Assari uses different media - including sculpting, drawing, painting, and photography - and has been featured in multiple exhibitions in the United States and Europe. Her works include The Cage (2003), Religion And Tolerance (2001) and Art For Peace (2000). The Religion And Tolerance work was selected for inclusion at the 2003 Florence Biennale (Italy) International Contemporary Art Exhibition.

== Exhibitions ==
Assari has had her artwork featured in the following exhibitions:

- Iranian Women Studies Exhibition - June 1998, University of the District of Columbia
- Artomatic - May 1999, Washington, DC
- Art for Peace - September 2000, Washington, DC
- Art-o-Matic - October 2000, Washington, DC
- Emotional Sensibilities - January 2002, Washington, DC
- Images of Protest and Peace - April 2003, Mt. Rainier, MD
- Group Exhibition - October 2003, Dubai, UAE
- Breaking the Silence: Questioning Authority - October 2003, Arlington, VA
- Florence Biennale International Contemporary Art Exhibition - December 2003, Florence, Italy
- Dialogue Through Art: A Pictorial Conversation - February 2004, Washington, DC
- Iranian Women Studies Exhibition - June–July 2007, College Park, MD
