= Suresh V. Shenoy =

- Born: India
- Education: IIT Bombay (B.Tech, 1972), University of Connecticut (MBA, 1975)
- Occupations: Engineer, business executive, philanthropist
- Known for: Executive VP, IMC; President, WHEELS Global Foundation
- Relatives: Sudhakar V. Shenoy (brother)

Suresh Venkatraya Shenoy is an Indian-American engineer, business executive, and philanthropist. He is known for leadership in information management consulting, alumni networks, and technology-enabled philanthropy. He has served as Executive Vice President of Information Management Consultants, Inc. (IMC), co-founded by his brother Sudhakar, and as President of WHEELS Global Foundation.

Shenoy also serves as chair of American Red Cross, National Capital Region (United States). He is on the boards of The Kevric Company, IMC Global Services, the Fairfax County Information Technology Advisory Committee, the Capital IIT Alumni Association and the Fairfax County Chamber of Commerce. He was also the Program Committee Chairman of the PanIIT Global Conference held in Washington, DC attended by more than 2,300 people. He served as co-president of the PanIIT Alumni Association in North America for the 2006–2008 Term.

== Early life and education ==
Shenoy graduated with a B.Tech in Metallurgical Engineering from the Indian Institute of Technology Bombay in 1972 and earned an MBA from the University of Connecticut in 1975.

== Career ==
After early roles in technology ventures and manufacturing, Shenoy joined IMC in 1989, providing consulting and enterprise content management services. He has also been adjunct faculty at George Mason University and served on boards including the Fairfax County Chamber of Commerce.

== Philanthropy ==
Shenoy is active in alumni and community service, serving as Co-President of PanIIT USA (2006–08) and Program Chair of the 2005 PanIIT Global Conference. As President of WHEELS Global Foundation, he has supported technology-driven initiatives in healthcare, education, water, and sustainability.

Shenoy was a founding member of the Thomas Jefferson Partnership Fund and served on its board until 2002. Thomas Jefferson Partnership Fund is a volunteer-driven nonprofit foundation for supporting the program and curriculum needs of Thomas Jefferson High School for Science & Technology, Alexandria, Virginia, United States.

Suresh Shenoy served on the board of the Fairfax County Library Foundation. He has served as chairman of the Emerging Technologies Advisory Group (EMTAG) at the Association of Information and Image Management (AIIM) for 1996–1997, where he served on the International board of directors. He was chairman of the International Society of Enterprise Engineers (ISEE), DC Chapter. He has also served as co-chair of the BPR-SIG for the Industry Advisory Council to US Government CIOs- chief information officers. Suresh has spoken at numerous industry events, including the annual AIIM International shows, Imaging Expo in New York City, COMDEX, the Information Management Congress in Europe and CENADEM in Brazil and his articles have been published in various industry publications. Suresh Shenoy was inducted as a Fellow of the Information Management Congress (Europe) and AIIM International (United States) in 2000.

== Recognition ==
He has received the IIT Bombay Distinguished Service Award and, with his brother, the Northern Virginia Community Foundation’s Community Leader Award, which was acknowledged in the U.S. Congress.
