= Lev Vekker =

Lev Markovich Vekker, Russian: Лев Маркович Веккер (4 October 1918, Odessa – 1 October 2001, Virginia, United States) was a Russian and American psychologist.

Vekker was a George Mason University professor of psychology and director/CEO of the Krasnow Institute. His research focused on the problems of objectivity of human cognition. Vekker advanced a general theory of cognitive processes.

== Works (in Russian) ==
- Психика и реальность: единая теория психических процессов (Psyche and reality: a Uniform Theory of Psychical Processes)
- Восприятие и основы его моделирования (Perception and Ways of Its Modeling)
