= Rebecca Wee =

American poet

- Education: BA, St. Olaf College; MFA, George Mason University
- Occupations: Poet, Professor
- Children: 2
- Writing career
- Genre: Poetry

Rebecca Wee is an American poet, and associate professor of creative writing.

== Biography ==
Rebecca Wee graduated from St. Olaf College in 1984. She later attended George Mason University where she studied poetry and served as editorial assistant to Carolyn Forche on her 1993 anthology Against Forgetting: Twentieth Century Poetry of Witness.

Rebecca Wee currently holds the post of Associate Professor on the English faculty at Augustana College, Rock Island, Illinois, where she teaches composition, literature, poetry workshops, and independent studies in poetry and creative writing.

Her first book of poems, Uncertain Grace, received the 2000 Hayden Carruth Award for New and Emerging Poets and was subsequently published in 2001 by Copper Canyon Press. In 2003 she was chosen by U.S. Poet Laureate Billy Collins to receive one of two annual Witter Bynner fellowships in poetry, supported by the Library of Congress and the Witter Bynner Foundation for Poetry.

From 2003–2005 Wee served as the second Poet Laureate of the Quad Cities.

== Books ==
- Uncertain Grace, (Copper Canyon Press, 2001), ISBN 1-55659-154-3
