= Kevin Avruch =

American anthropologist and sociologist

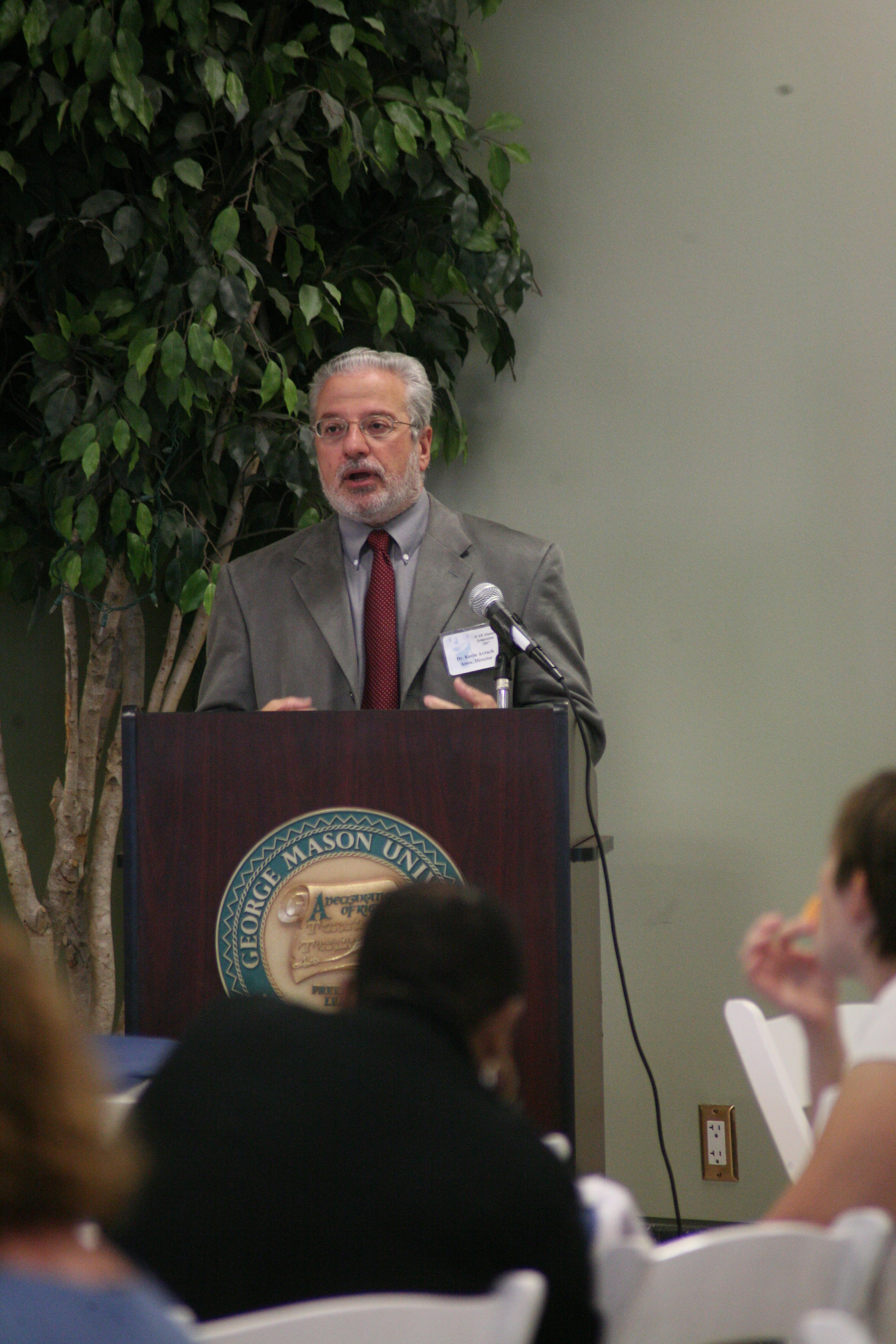
- Kevin Avruch, 2007
- Born: 22 February 1950 (age 76); Brooklyn, NY
- Education: University of California, San Diego (PhD, MA); University of Chicago (AB)
- Occupations: Academic, author, Dean of the School for Conflict Analysis and Resolution

Kevin Avruch (born the 22 February 1950 in Brooklyn, New York) is an American anthropologist and sociologist, Dean of the School for Conflict Analysis and Resolution at George Mason University. He is the Henry Hart Rice Professor of Conflict Resolution and Professor of Anthropology. He received his PhD in anthropology from the University of California, San Diego in 1978, where he also received his MA in anthropology in 1973. He received his AB from the University of Chicago. Dr. Avruch joined the faculty at George Mason University in 1980 after teaching at the University of Illinois and the University of California, San Diego. He has also taught at the Mediterranean Academy of Diplomatic Studies at the University of Malta, the Kroc School of Peace Studies at the University of San Diego, the United Nations University for Peace in Costa Rica as well as for the Program in Conflict Resolution at Sabancı University in Istanbul. In 2011 he was a Fulbright specialist at the Banaras Hindu University.

Dr. Avruch is notable for his contributions to the developing field of Conflict Analysis and Resolution and has championed the importance of culture in understanding conflict. His work provided a counterbalance to the search for grand theories of human behavior and highlights the need for attending to particularities of culture in conflict analysis and conflict resolution. Together with Peter W. Black, another anthropologist at George Mason University, Avruch critiqued John Burton's theory of Basic Human Needs, asserting that it needed to recognize the fact that needs are understood and met differently in different cultures.

== Notable works ==
- Culture & Conflict Resolution. United States Institute of Peace. 1998. ISBN 9781878379825.
- Context and Pretext in Conflict Resolution: Culture, Identity, Power, and Practice. Paradigm Publishers. 2012. ISBN 978-1612050591.
- Avruch, Kevin; Black, Peter W. (January 1991). "The Culture Question And Conflict Resolution". Peace & Change. 16 (1): 22–45. doi:10.1111/j.1468-0130.1991.tb00563.x.
- Avruch, Kevin; Black, Peter W. (1987). "A "Generic" Theory of Conflict Resolution: A Critique". Negotiation Journal. 3 (1): 87–96. doi:10.1111/j.1571-9979.1987.tb00395.x.
- Conflict Resolution: Cross-Cultural Perspectives. Praeger Publishers. 1998. ISBN 978-0-275-96442-9.
