= Robert Bausch =

American writer

- Born: April 18, 1945; Fort Benning, Georgia, U.S.
- Died: October 9, 2018 (aged 73); Fredericksburg, Virginia, U.S.
- Education: George Mason University (BA, MA, MFA)
- Relatives: Richard Bausch
- Writing career
- Genre: Novel
- Notable awards: Dos Passos Prize
- Website: www.robertbausch.org

Robert Bausch (April 18, 1945 – October 9, 2018) was an American fiction writer, the author of nine novels and one collection of short stories. He was a professor of English at Northern Virginia Community College, and he had taught at the University of Virginia, The American University, Johns Hopkins University, George Mason University, and the University of Maryland, Baltimore County. His fourth novel, A Hole in the Earth, was a New York Times Notable Book of the Year and a Washington Post Favorite Book of the Year. He was awarded the Fellowship of Southern Writers' award for fiction for his fifth novel, The Gypsy Man. In 2005, Harcourt published his sixth novel, Out of Season, which was a Washington Post favorite book of the year. His novel Far as the Eye Can See was released by Bloomsbury Press in fall 2014, and in August 2016, Bloomsbury published his last novel, The Legend of Jesse Smoke. In 2009, he was awarded the Dos Passos Prize in Literature. He was the twin brother of the author Richard Bausch.

== Early life ==
Robert and Richard Bausch were born identical twins in Fort Benning, Georgia, United States, in 1945, at the end of World War II, and were raised in the Washington, D. C., area. Robert has worked as a salesman—of automobiles, appliances, and hardware—a taxi driver, waiter, production planner, and library assistant. He was educated at George Mason University, earning a BA, an MA and an MFA, and he says he has been a writer all his life. He spent time in the military teaching survival, and worked his way through college.

== Literary career ==
Bausch published his first novel, On the Way Home, in 1982. Newsweek called the novel “compelling” and it was favorably reviewed in the Los Angeles Times, The Washington Post, and other publications. His second novel, The Lives of Riley Chance, was published in 1984 and was praised by The New York Times, The Washington Post, and the Los Angeles Times. It was later translated into Swedish. Almighty Me, his third novel, was published in 1991. Again The New York Times, The Washington Post, and other newspapers praised it highly. The rights to the book were sold to Hollywood Films, a division of Disney Studios. Almighty Me was also published in German. This book was later released in film version, uncredited, as Bruce Almighty.

In 1995, Bausch published a collection of short stories called The White Rooster and Other Stories. The Dictionary of Literary Biography awarded the book its literary prize for the most distinguished fiction for 1995.

A Hole in the Earth, (Harcourt, 2001; Harvest Books, 2002) his fourth novel, was inspired by his father, Robert Carl Bausch, a successful Washington businessman, who died unexpectedly in 1995 at the age of 79. "I tried to put everything my father believed in that book," Bausch has said. "Out of respect for him, and because, as my narrator comes to see, he was right about most things." Bausch comes from a "functional" family; one that was happy and that included an identical twin brother (the novelist Richard Bausch) and four other brothers and sisters. Their parents, Helen and Robert Bausch, were happily married, staunchly Democratic and Catholic, and they stayed married for fifty-five years. A Hole in the Earth was a New York Times Notable Book of the Year, and a Washington Post Favorite Book of the Year in 2001.

The Gypsy Man, his fifth novel, was published by Harcourt in October, 2002 and again, in paperback by Harvest Books.

Bausch's sixth novel, Out of Season, was published in the fall of 2005. It was a Washington Post Favorite Book of the year as well. His seventh novel, Far as the Eye Can See, was released by Bloomsbury Press in November 2014. The Legend of Jesse Smoke was released in August 2016.

Since 1975, Bausch had been a college professor, teaching creative writing, American literature, world literature, humanities, philosophy, and expository writing. For the balance of his career, he had been teaching at Northern Virginia Community College. He had also taught at the Algonkian Writers Conference and served as a director on the board of the PEN/Faulkner Foundation.

== Novels ==
- On the Way Home, 1982
- The Lives of Riley Chance, 1984
- Almighty Me!, 1991, ISBN 9780595407958
- A Hole in the Earth, 2000, ISBN 9780156011846
- The Gypsy Man, 2002, Harcourt, ISBN 9780156028738
- Out of Season, 2005, ISBN 9781450242165
- In the Fall They Come Back, 2011, ISBN 9781463618681
- The Legend of Jesse Smoke, 2012, ISBN 9781466271517
- Far As the Eye Can See, Bloomsbury Publishing USA, 2014, ISBN 9781620402610

== Short stories ==
- The White Rooster and Other Stories, Gibbs Smith Publisher, 1995, ISBN 9780879057213
