= Klaus Fischer (mathematician) =

German-American mathematician (1943–2009)

- Born: November 12, 1943; Zwickau, Germany
- Died: July 2, 2009 (aged 65); Fairfax Station, Virginia, United States
- Education: Northwestern University
- Known for: algebraic geometry, commutative algebra, graph theory, and combinatorics
- Scientific career
- Fields: Mathematician
- Workplaces: George Mason University
- Doctoral advisor: Kenneth Roy Mount

Klaus Gunter Fischer (November 12, 1943 – July 2, 2009) was a German-American mathematician of German origin. He worked on a wide range of problems in algebraic geometry, commutative algebra, graph theory, and combinatorics.

Fischer was chair of the Mathematics Department at George Mason University at the time of his death.
