= Marc Gopin =

Marc Gopin is the director of the Center for World Religions, Diplomacy and Conflict Resolution (CRDC), and James H. Laue Professor at the School of Conflict Analysis and Resolution at George Mason University.

The Association for Conflict Resolution awarded Gopin its Peacemaker Award for his contribution to the conflict resolution field. Gopin also received the Andrew Thomas Peacebuilder Award from the New York State Dispute Resolution Association.

Gopin designed peacebuilding projects for the CRDC. These projects included training peacebuilders in Afghanistan, Iran, Syria, Palestine and Israel.

Gopin has worked in Ireland, Israel, India, Switzerland, and Italy, and has presented at Harvard, Yale, Columbia, and Princeton Universities. He has also engaged in diplomacy with religious, political, and military figures on both sides of entrenched conflicts, especially in the Israel-Palestine conflict, Jordan, and Syria.

== Education ==
Gopin got his B.A. in European Intellectual History from Columbia College in 1979. In 1983, Gopin was ordained as a rabbi at Yeshiva University, where he was a student of Rabbi Joseph Soloveitchik. He received his M.A. from Brandeis University in 1988 where he also got his PhD in 1992 from the Department of Near Eastern and Judaic Studies.

== Published Works ==
- Gopin, Marc (2016). Healing the Heart of Conflict: Eight Crucial Steps to Making Peace with Yourself and with Others Revised and Updated. Create Space Independent Publishing Platform. ISBN 1536833428.
- Gopin, Marc (2012). Bridges across an Impossible Divide: The Inner Lives of Arab and Jewish Peacemakers. Oxford University Press. ISBN 9780199916986.
- To Make the Earth Whole: Citizen Diplomacy in the Age of Religious Militancy. Rowman and Littlefield. 2009. ISBN 9780742558632.
- Changing Course: A New Direction for US Relations with the Muslim World, co-author and member of Leadership Group (US Muslim Engagement Project, Washington DC, Cambridge, MA, September 2008)
- Gopin, Marc (2004). Healing the Heart of Conflict: 8 Crucial Steps to Making Peace with Yourself and Others. Rodale Press. ISBN 9781579547936. "Marc_Gopin."
- "Judaism and Peacebuilding in Religion and Peacebuilding, Albany: State University of New York Press, 2004
- Gopin, Marc (2002). Holy War, Holy Peace: How Religion Can Bring Peace to the Middle East. Oxford University Press. ISBN 9780195146509. "Marc_Gopin."
- Gopin, Marc (2001). Religion and International Relations at the Crossroads. International Studies Review, 3(3), 157–160.
- Gopin, Marc (2000). Between Eden and Armageddon: The Future of World Religions, Violence and Peacemaking. Oxford University Press. ISBN 9780195157253.
- Gopin, Marc (1998). An Orthodox Embrace of Gentiles? Interfaith Tolerance in the Thought of S. D. Luzzatto and E. Benamozegh. Modern Judaism, 18(2), 173–195.
