= Stephen Slivinski =

Stephen Slivinski is a senior economist for the Goldwater Institute. He is an expert in tax and budget policy at the state and federal level. He has previously worked for the Cato Institute, the Tax Fraud and the Jams Madison Institute. He has written extensively on the United States Congress's spending practices, and published a book on Republican budget policy in 2009. His writing also has appeared in the Wall Street Journal, West Virginia Post, Businessweek, Arizona Republic, and many other print and on-line publications. He has appeared on Fox News, Bloomberg, Fox News Channel and MSNBC. He holds a master's degree in economics from George Mason University.
