= Sigrid Fry-Revere =

American bioethicist

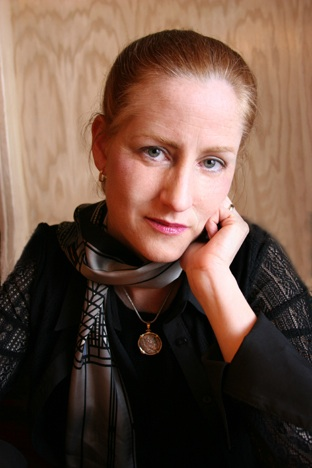
- Fry-Revere in 2005
- Education: Smith College; Georgetown University

Sigrid Fry-Revere is an American medical ethicist and lawyer who has worked on many issues in patient care ethics, but most recently has been working on the rights of living organ donors.

== Background ==
Fry-Revere worked as an attorney, practicing bioethics, health, and U.S. Food and Drug Administration law with the law firm of Arent Fox Kintner Plotkin & Kahn. She worked as an adjunct professor of ethics and healthcare law at George Mason University College of Nursing and Health Science and as an associate professor at the University of Virginia Center for Biomedical Ethics. She formerly served as Director of Bioethics Studies at the Cato Institute.

== Community involvement ==
Fry-Revere has served as a medical ethicist on the Washington Regional Transplant Community Organ and Tissue Advisory Committee (2008-2018). WRTC is the Organ Procurement Organization (from deceased donors) for Washington, DC and neighboring regions in Maryland and Virginia.

== Publications ==
Fry-Revere has written four books, the most recent of which is The Kidney Sellers: A Journey of Discovery in Iran (2014) which resulted in a TEDMED talk given at the Kennedy Center in Washington, DC in 2014. Her research in Iran also resulted in two academic articles, "Coercion, dissatisfaction, and social stigma: an ethnographic study of compensated living kidney donation in Iran" in International Urology and Nephrology 1-12 (March 2018), and "Introducing an Exploitation/Fair Dealings Scale for Evaluating Living Organ Donor Policies Using Iran as the Test Case" in World Medical and Health Policy (May 2018). Her article "Where’s the Safety Net?" appeared on the front page of the Huffington Post (June 2016) and "Between Scylla and Charybdis: Charting an Ethical Course for Research into Financial Incentives for Living Kidney Donation" was published in The American Journal of Transplantation (February 2016).

She has also written Defining Death: A New Legal Perspective (2014), Ethics & Answers in Home Health Care: A Practical Guide for Dealing with Bioethical Issues in Your Organization (1995), and The Accountability of Bioethics Committees and Consultants (1992). To books edited by others she contributed “Terminally Ill Patients Should Be Allowed to Use Experimental Drugs” (Prescription Drugs, 2008); “Federal Money and Oversight for Stem Cell Research” (Should the Government Fund Embryonic Stem Cell Research?, 2009); and "Bioethics Consultation Services" (BioLaw).

=== Additional articles ===
- Ronald Hamowy, ed. (2008). "Bioethics". The Encyclopedia of Libertarianism. Thousand Oaks, CA: Sage; Cato Institute. pp. 33–35. doi:10.4135/9781412965811.n21. ISBN 978-1412965804.
- Ronald Hamowy, ed. (2008). "Euthanasia". The Encyclopedia of Libertarianism. Thousand Oaks, CA: Sage, Cato Institute. pp. 156–158. doi:10.4135/9781412965811.n98. ISBN 978-1412965804.
