= Doha Mekki =

American antitrust lawyer

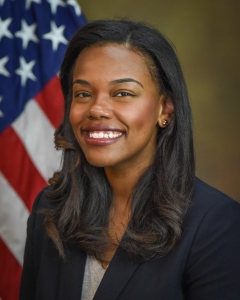

Acting United States Assistant Attorney General for the Antitrust Division
- In office December 21, 2024 – January 20, 2025
- President: Joe Biden
- Preceded by: Jonathan Kanter
- Succeeded by: Gail Slater

Personal details
- Born: Sudan
- Education: Duke University (B.A.); University of Pennsylvania (J.D., M.B.E)

Doha Mekki is an American attorney and civil servant. On December 21, 2024, Mekki became Acting Assistant Attorney General for the U.S. Department of Justice (DOJ) Antitrust Division following Jonathan Kanter's resignation as Assistant Attorney General.

Prior to this, Mekki served as Principal Deputy Assistant Attorney General under Kanter, the division's second most senior position. Described as one of the Biden administration's "key antitrust enforcers" by The New York Times, Mekki had previously served in other roles in the DOJ Antitrust Division in both the first Trump and Obama administrations.

== Early life and education ==
Mekki was born in Sudan. Her mother moved to the United States in order to pursue doctorate degree. At age four, Mekki and her family moved to Charlotte, North Carolina. Mekki received a B.A. from Duke University. She received her legal education from the University of Pennsylvania Law School, graduating in 2011. She additionally holds a M.B.E. in Bioethics from the University of Pennsylvania.

== Career ==
After working in a New York City-based law firm after graduating law school, she joined the Department of Justice Antitrust Division in 2015. During the Trump administration, Mekki worked under Assistant Attorney General Makan Delrahim, where she focused on labor market issues.

=== Biden Administration ===
Mekki was selected to serve as Principal Deputy Assistant Attorney General for the Antitrust Division in 2022. At the time of her appointment, she had served a total of seven years at the DOJ, where she worked on issues including no-hire pacts and illegal wage-fixing. Politico reported in 2022 that she was "often described by people within the agency as "brilliant" and a "rising star".

In this role, Mekki worked alongside Kanter to prepare the department's antitrust lawsuit against Live Nation Entertainment and Ticketmaster. She additionally worked on cases including the DOJ's antitrust suit against the JetBlue - Spirit Airlines merger. The New York Times reported in 2023 that Mekki helped "quarterback" the United States v. Google antitrust lawsuit and was expected to be in the courtroom daily during the trial.

In her position, she argued that antitrust enforcers should have a "bias towards action" approach towards reining in anti-competitive behavior, arguing that past enforcers had been too lenient when scrutinizing antitrust violations. Mekki has argued that antitrust enforcers should make promoting competition in labor markets a priority.

Following Kanter's resignation, she became acting Assistant Attorney General, with the expectation that she would serve in the position for the remainder of the Biden administration. In this position, she launched an antitrust lawsuit against landlords over unlawful rent price collusion.

=== Post-Biden Administration ===
In 2025, she became a senior fellow at the University of California, Berkeley School of Law’s Center for Consumer Law & Economic Justice.
