= Taylor Swift–Ticketmaster controversy =

Concert tour ticket sales issues

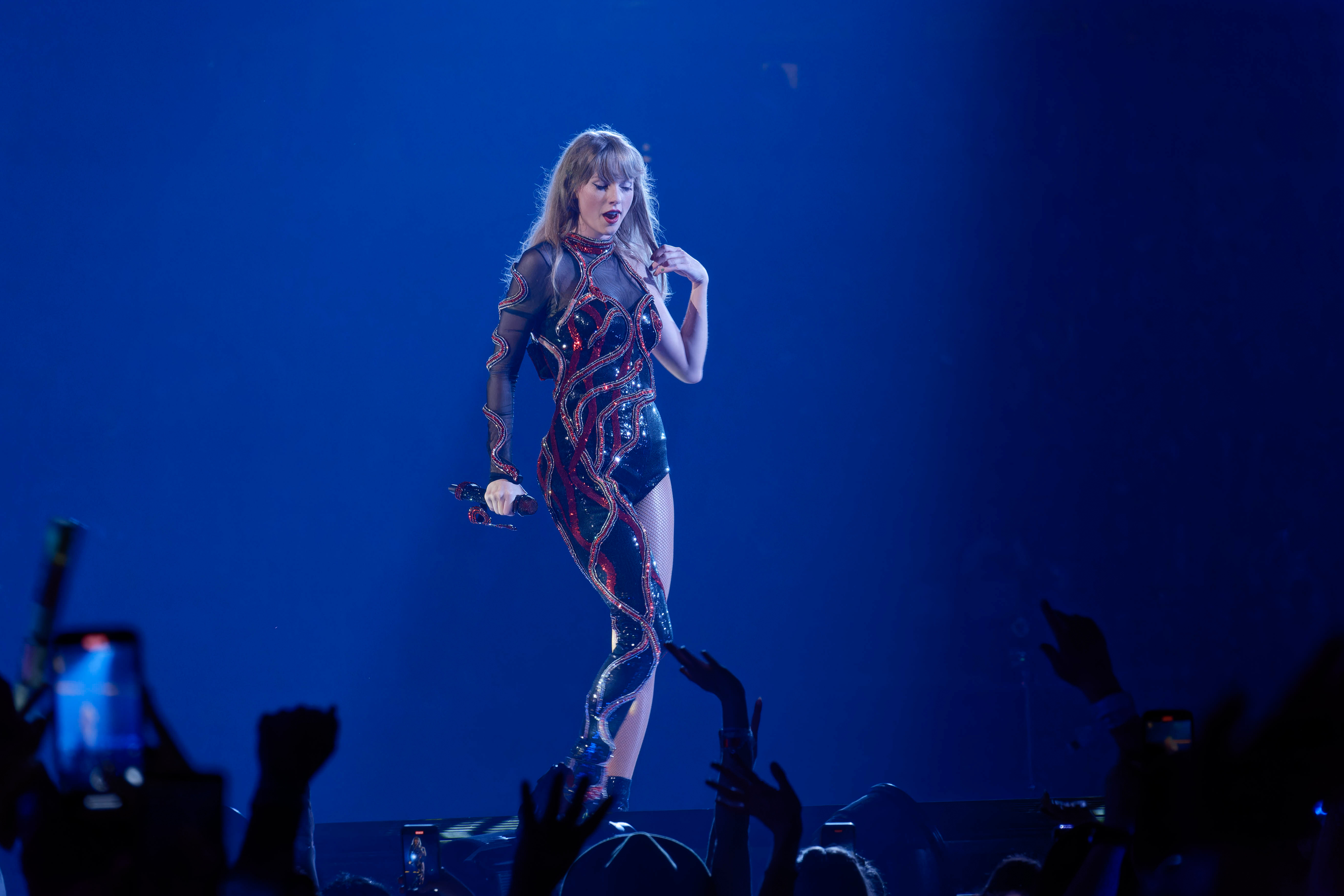
Taylor Swift performing on the Eras Tour in 2023. Ticketmaster received criticism for mishandling the U.S. ticket sale of the tour.

The American ticket sales platform Ticketmaster and its parent company Live Nation Entertainment were met with widespread public criticism and political scrutiny over blunders in selling tickets to the 2023 United States leg of the Eras Tour, the sixth concert tour by Taylor Swift, in November 2022. Media outlets have often referred to it as the Taylor Swift–Ticketmaster fiasco.

Media outlets described the demand for the Eras Tour's tickets as "astronomical", with 3.5 million people registering for the Ticketmaster's Verified Fan pre-sale program in the U.S. When the sale went online on November 15, 2022, the website crashed in an hour, with users logged out or in a frozen queue; however, 2.4 million tickets were sold, breaking the record for the highest single-day ticket sales ever by an artist. Ticketmaster attributed the crash to heavy site traffic—"historically unprecedented demand with millions showing up"—but users complained about poor customer service. Live Nation blamed Swift's "staggering" demand "overwhelming" them beyond capacity, and canceled the general sale due to "insufficient" inventory along with an apology.

Scalpers had purchased a large number of tickets and put them on websites for exorbitant prices. Numerous fans and consumer groups alleged that Ticketmaster was deceitful. In response, several U.S. Congress members voiced to revert the 2010 merger of Ticketmaster and Live Nation, (Note: Ticketmaster is a ticket sales and distribution company; Live Nation is a tour promotion and venue operation company. They merged in 2010 to form a consolidated entertainment company, Live Nation Entertainment.) which they dubbed a monopoly lacking competitive pressure, leading to substandard service and extortionate prices. Swift's tour promoter, AEG Presents, said Ticketmaster's exclusive deals with the majority of U.S. live venues coerced AEG into working with them. In December 2022, several fans sued Ticketmaster for many violations such as intentional deception, fraud, price fixing, and antitrust. Publications stated the controversy highlighted one of the longstanding issues in the music industry and that the United States Department of Justice had been investigating the merger.

In 2023, the United States Senate Committee on the Judiciary held a hearing regarding the issue wherein senators castigated Ticketmaster. States such as New York, Texas, and California outlawed scalper bots and regulated pricing models. Following pressure from then U.S. president Joe Biden, Ticketmaster and other ticket platforms agreed to abolish junk fees and show consumers all the fees upfront. Ticketmaster again faced criticism for the tour's European ticket sales, inviting a subpoena from the U.S. Permanent Subcommittee on Investigations. In 2024, the federal government of the United States, co-signed by 40 U.S. states, filed an antitrust lawsuit against Live Nation–Ticketmaster, alleging unlawful business practices that have been detrimental to the live music industry and seeking to dissolve the merger. The Federal Trade Commission (FTC) imposed a federal ban on all deceptive, surprise fees. In 2025, President Donald Trump signed an executive order directing the FTC to eliminate price gouging by ticket resellers. Two individuals, who hacked over 900 tickets to the Eras Tour on StubHub and earned $635,000 in illegal profits, were charged and arraigned in New York City for tampering, money laundering, and larceny.

In April 2026, a federal jury found Ticketmaster parent company Live Nation Entertainment liable for holding an illegal monopoly which not only violated federal and state anti-trust laws, but also enabled Ticketmaster to overcharge on ticket prices.

== Background ==
=== Ticketmaster ===
Ticketmaster Entertainment, Inc. is an American ticket sales and distribution company based in Beverly Hills, California with operations in many countries around the world. It was founded in Phoenix, Arizona in 1976 by college staffers Peter Gadwa and Albert Leffler, as well as businessman Gordon Gunn III.

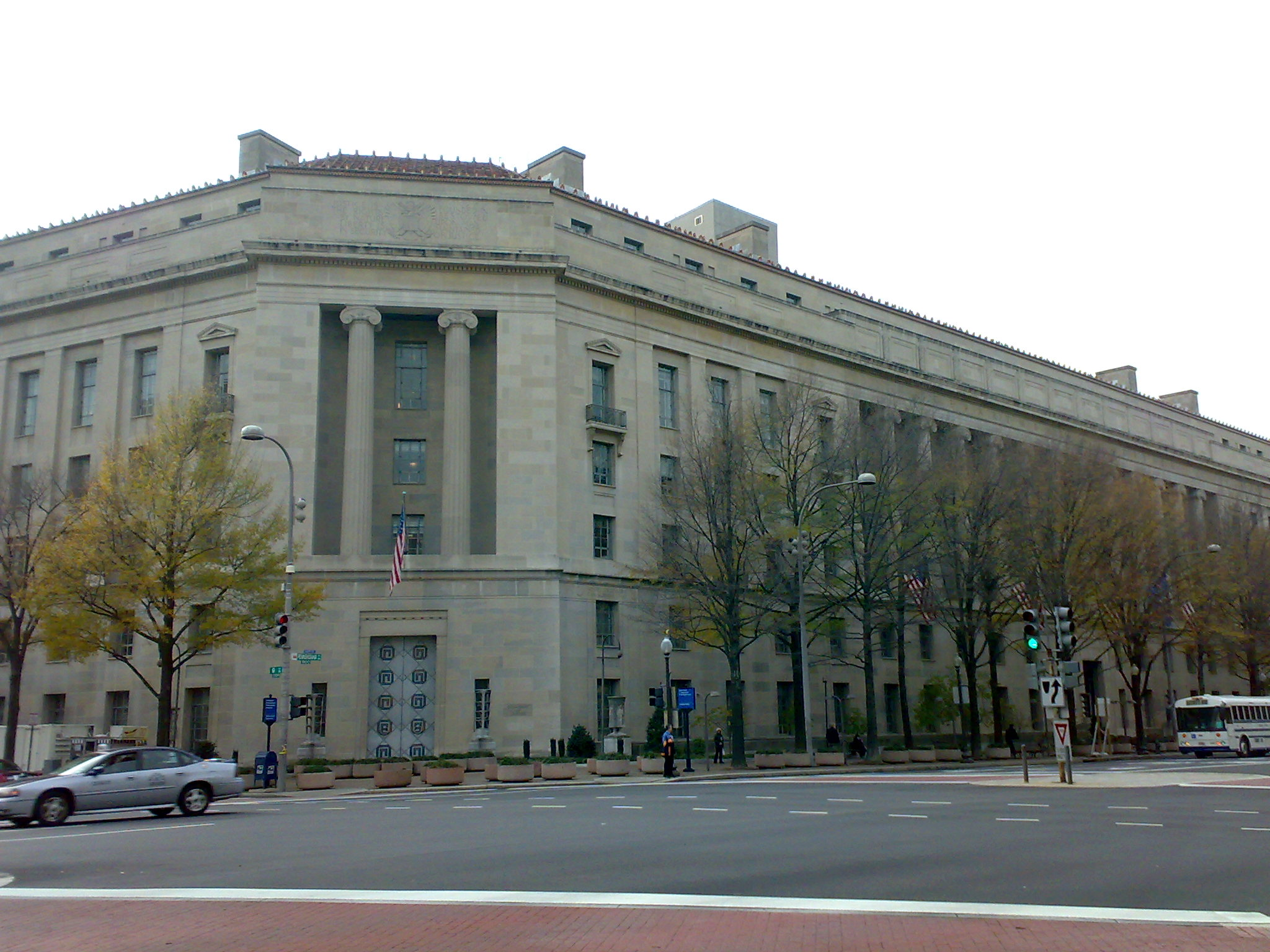
The United States Department of Justice office in Washington, D.C.

In 1994, American rock band Pearl Jam filed a complaint with the antitrust division of the U.S. Department of Justice, claiming that Ticketmaster has a "virtually absolute monopoly on the distribution of tickets to concerts" and attempted to book its tour only at venues that did not use Ticketmaster. However, no action was taken on Ticketmaster. In the 21st century, Ticketmaster became the largest ticket sales company in the world.

In February 2009, Ticketmaster entered into an agreement to merge with the world's largest event promoter, Live Nation, to form Live Nation Entertainment. The deal was cleared by the U.S. Justice Department in January 2010 under the condition that the company sell Paciolan to Comcast Spectacor or another firm, and license its software to Anschutz Entertainment Group (AEG), its biggest competitor. The new company, which would be called Live Nation Entertainment, would also be subject to provisions for 10 years that prevented it from retaliating against venues that partnered with competing ticketing firms. Live Nation CEO Michael Rapino was named CEO of the new company.

Ticketmaster was the subject of several controversies, such as anti-competition claims, deceitful relationships with scalpers, data breach, deceptive pricing, and dynamic pricing. According to consumer organizations, Ticketmaster and Live Nation control over 70% of the primary ticketing and live event venues market. The merger has faced longstanding criticism. Earlier in 2022, both Ticketmaster and Live Nation received public backlash and media attention on their dynamic pricing and "platinum" ticket model when tickets for Bruce Springsteen's and Blink-182's 2023 tours (both of which were being promoted by Live Nation) went on sale in July and October respectively. Fans of both acts criticized the price of random seats across the venue going for hundreds or even thousands of dollars during pre-sales or general public sales.

=== Taylor Swift ===
American singer-songwriter Taylor Swift released her tenth studio album, Midnights, on October 21, 2022, to widespread commercial success and critical acclaim. On November 1, she announced on Good Morning America and through her social media accounts that her sixth concert tour, in support of Midnights and all of her previous albums, would be called the Eras Tour. (Note: Stylized as Taylor Swift | The Eras Tour) Its U.S. leg, which initially consisted of 27 dates across 20 cities, started on March 17, 2023, in Glendale, Arizona, and concluded on August 9, 2023, in Inglewood, California, with tickets sold via Ticketmaster. This marks Swift's first shows in the U.S. since her Reputation Stadium Tour in 2018, which broke the record for the highest grossing U.S. tour in history. Some of the dates, such as those in Glendale, were sold via SeatGeek. Following popular demand, on November 4, Swift added eight extra U.S. dates to existing cities, bringing the total number of concerts to 35. Higher demand prompted 17 more shows to be added the following week, making the Eras Tour the biggest U.S. tour of Swift's career, with 52 dates, surpassing Reputation Stadium Tour's 38 dates.

The U.S. tickets were set to go on sale to the general public on November 18, 2022. Capital One cardholders had presale access on November 15. Fans registered for the Ticketmaster Verified Fan program from November 1 through 9 to receive a presale code that granted exclusive access to the TaylorSwiftTix Presale on November 15. Swift abandoned the "platinum ticket" model for the tour. According to Ticketmaster, the TaylorSwiftTix Presale provided "the best opportunity to get more tickets into the hands of fans who want to attend the show" by evading bots and scalpers. It noted that if the demand exceeds supply, it is possible that "verified fans may be selected at random to participate in the presale." USA Today reported that the listing for the Nashville dates included the disclaimer that "ticket prices may fluctuate, based on demand, at any time."

== Website crash ==
The Eras Tour recorded an incredibly high demand for tickets, ultimately exposing significant issues in operational preparedness. On November 15, the day of the pre-sale, Ticketmaster's website crashed following "historically unprecedented demand with millions showing up", halting the presale. In less than an hour of availability, the ticketing platform's servers were "unable to answer", with users experiencing turbulence—"either completely logged out or in a queue 2,000-plus people strong that appeared frozen" as per Rolling Stone. Ticketmaster immediately published a statement saying they are working to fix the issues "as the site was unprepared to accommodate the sheer force of hundreds of thousands of Swift fans", and subsequently reported that "hundreds of thousands of tickets" had already been sold and postponed the remainder of the presale, including the Capital One presale to November 16. The public on-sale was later canceled due to "extraordinarily high demands on ticketing systems and insufficient remaining ticket inventory to meet that demand". The Eras Tour sold over two million tickets on its first day of presale alone, breaking the all-time record for the most concert tickets sold by an artist in a single day.

During and immediately after the website crash, Ticketmaster was widely criticized by fans and customers on social media for its ticketing model that obstructed purchasing. According to The New York Times, the ticket sale failure "broke the internet". "Ticketmaster" trended number one worldwide on various social media platforms such as Twitter and TikTok. CNN Business stated that the "astronomical" demand indicated Swift's popularity. However, Fortune and Bloomberg News attributed the criticism to Ticketmaster's "oft-confusing multistep buying process plagued with additional fees", as well as "long waits, technical problems, and poor customer service".

== Responses and impact ==
=== Concerned parties ===
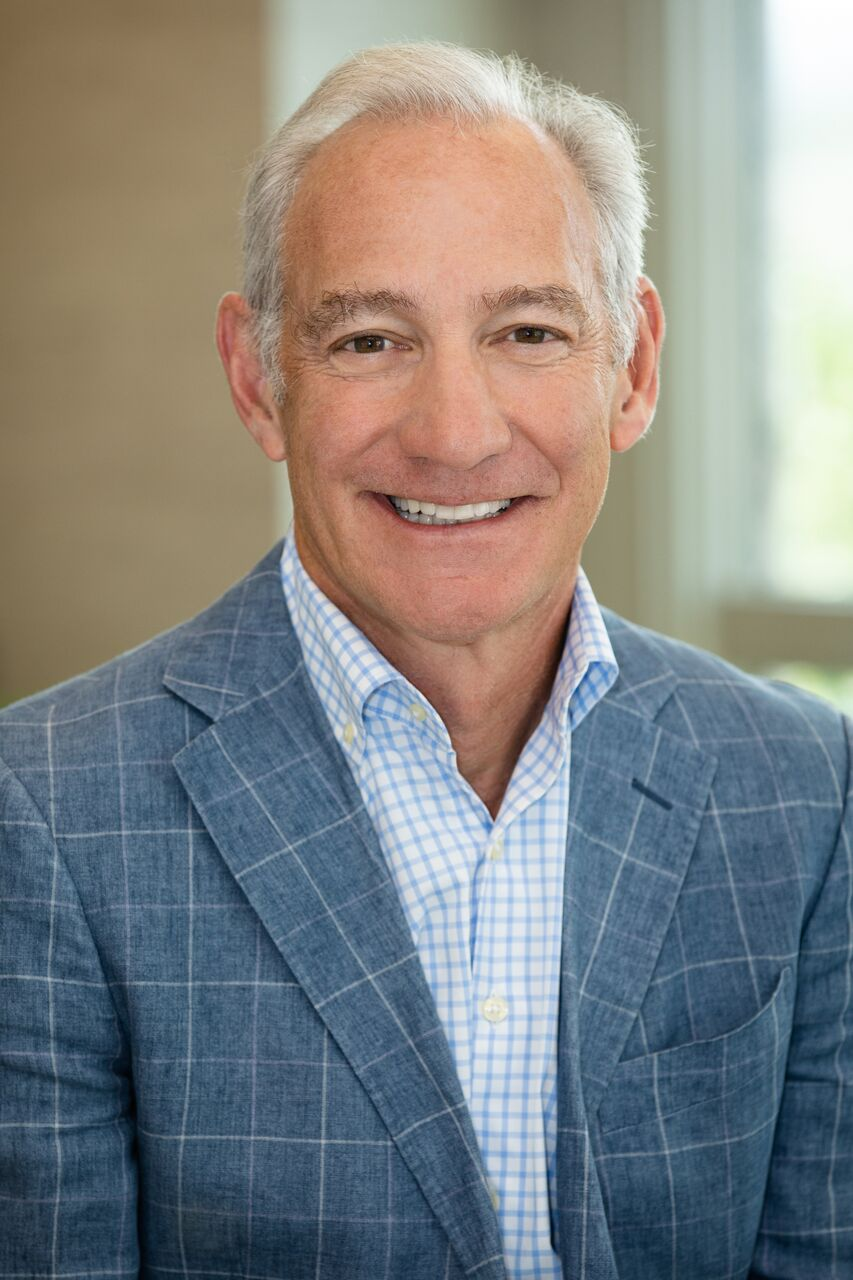
Greg Maffei, chairman of Live Nation Entertainment, in 2019

Greg Maffei, chairman of Live Nation, spoke to CNBC on November 16. He claimed that Ticketmaster prepared for 1.5 million verified fans but 14 million showed up: "we could have filled 900 stadiums." In a detailed statement, Ticketmaster explained that 3.5 million fans pre-registered for the Verified Fan program—the largest in platform history—two million of whom were placed on the waitlist while 1.5 million were allowed to purchase first, as only "40% of invited fans actually show up and buy tickets, and most purchase an average of 3 tickets." However, the website was overwhelmed by the "staggering" number of fans as well as bots without presale codes, resulting in "3.5 billion total system requests—[four times the site's] previous peak." Therefore, Ticketmaster attempted to slow down the sale by waitlisting more customers "to stabilize the systems", which in turn prolonged the queue and waiting time. The company confirmed on November 17 that the November 18 public on-sale was canceled as well, citing inability to meet demand.

Maffei also claimed that "AEG, our competitor, who is the promoter for Taylor Swift, chose to use us because, in reality, we are the largest and most effective ticket seller in the world ... Even our competitors want to come on our platform." However, AEG rejected Maffei's claim that AEG chose to work with Ticketmaster, stating that AEG was forced to work with Ticketmaster since "Ticketmaster's exclusive deals with the vast majority of venues on the Eras Tour required us to ticket through their system."

Swift released a statement on November 18, 2022, via her Instagram story; she stated that she is "pissed off" and found the fiasco "excruciating". She asserted that she is protective of her fans and wanted to assure a quality experience and claimed that it had been difficult to "trust an outside entity with these relationships and loyalties". She noted that she was "not going to make excuses for anyone because we asked [Ticketmaster], multiple times, if they could handle this kind of demand and we were assured they could."

Later that same day, Ticketmaster issued an apology "to Taylor and all of her fans" via their Twitter account, but remarked that "less than 5% of the tickets for the tour have been sold or posted for resale on the secondary market" such as StubHub. Ticketmaster also dismissed accusations of anti-competitive practices, noting it remains "under a consent decree with the Justice Department following its 2010 merger with Live Nation" and the absence of "evidence of systemic violations of the consent decree."

Former Ticketmaster CEO Fred Rosen was unmoved by fans' outrage, telling the Los Angeles Times: "The public brought all this on itself ... I have no sympathy for people whining about high ticket prices ... They helped create this situation where artists have to make all their money on tour. Artists and the market set the prices, and you can't pay a Motel 6 price and stay at the Four Seasons." Rosen argued that all proposed solutions risked leaving fans even worse off: "Ticketmaster got thrown under the bus because it's easy to throw them under the bus ... There is no solution that won't piss people off more."

On December 12, 2022, Ticketmaster began mailing select registered fans—"identified as [fans] who received a boost during the Verified Fan presale but did not purchase tickets"—and notified them of a second ticket-purchasing opportunity, with which they can buy a maximum of two tickets each. Ticketmaster stated that Swift's team asked the company to create this opportunity for fans. Billboard reported that Ticketmaster opted to sell the remaining 170,000 unsold seats over four weeks through Ticketstoday, a ticketing platform that was originally built for Dave Matthews Band's fanclub in the 2000s but was later sold to Live Nation, to "significantly reduce fan wait times" and avoid high website traffic.

=== Fans and consumers ===
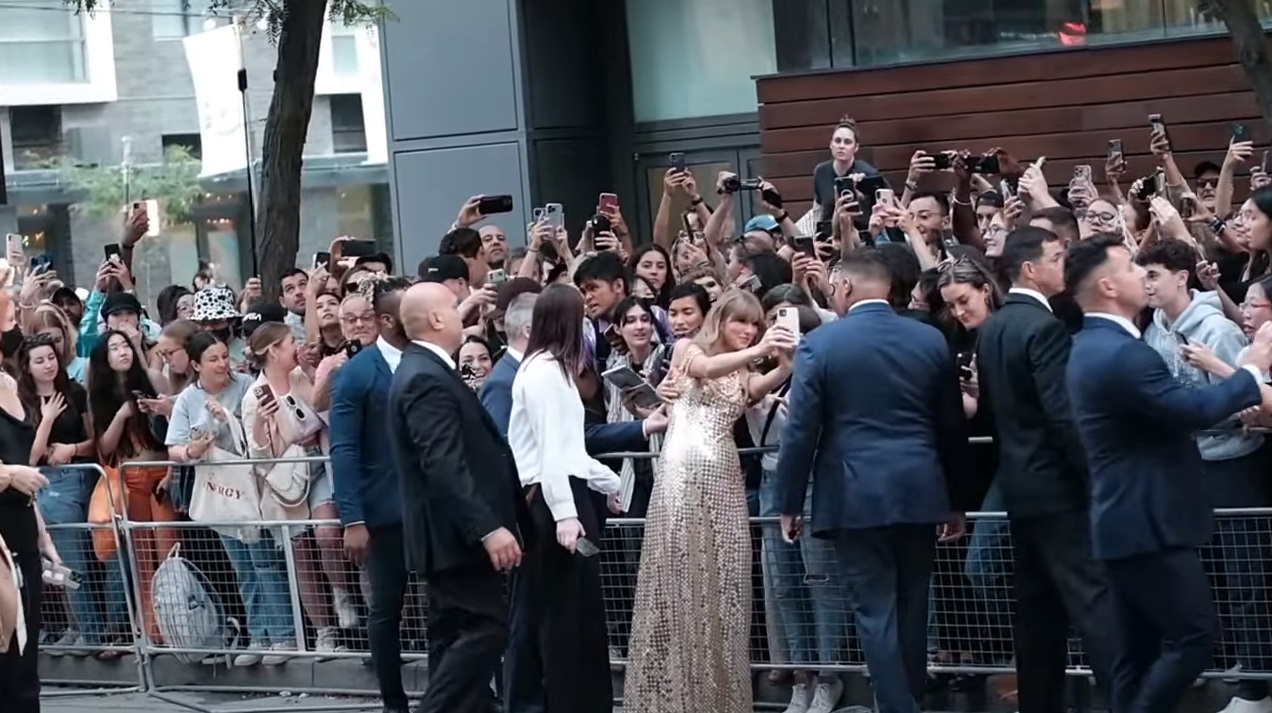
Swift's fanbase played the pivotal role in turning the fiasco into a nationwide discourse on Live Nation's monopoly in the music concert business.

Swift's fans, known as "Swifties", were particularly upset with the fiasco, some of whom proceeded with legal action. Lawyers who were fans of Swift mobilized a grassroots group called Vigilante Legal LLC., a play on Swift's 2022 song "Vigilante Shit"; its core group consists of over 50 professionals with law, government, public relations, and computer science backgrounds—"anyone from lawyers, to people who work in finance or banking, to those with antitrust experience." The group was founded by American attorney and Swift fan Blake Barnett and American paralegal and Swift fan Courtney Hanson-Miller. She reported that she had received over 1,200 responses as of November 18, 2022. Vigilante Legal also began gathering evidence from fans who experienced "discriminatory and questionable service" from Ticketmaster, including a potential violation of the Americans with Disabilities Act of 1990. The group has been collecting the complaints to bring forward to the Federal Trade Commission and the attorneys general within each U.S. state.

Voters of Tomorrow, a political activist organization led by Generation Z, opened an antitrust initiative called "S.W.I.F.T." (Swifties Working to Increase Fairness from Ticketmaster) on November 17, with aims to "bring together Gen Z organizers to advocate for legislation expanding federal authority to oversee and prevent future monopolies around entertainment."

In order to evade scalpers, some fans used their "tight-knit community" across social media platforms to form accounts such as "@ErasTourResell" and "TS Tour Connect" to organize a network of spreadsheets, Google Forms, and online bulletin boards, which facilitated exchanges of tickets at face-value costs from fans who wanted to re-sell to fans who wanted to buy. Volunteers of the initiative worked through ticket submissions, verified them via screen recordings and confirmation emails, and posted out the listings of tickets. ErasTourResell is headed by three fans of Swift, namely Courtney Johnston, Channette Garay, and Angel Richards. According to The New York Times, ErasTourResell alone has arranged over 1,300 ticket transactions between fans as of March 2023. According to The Wall Street Journal, ErasTourResell has helped over 3,000 fans get tickets at face value as of July 2023.

=== Political action ===
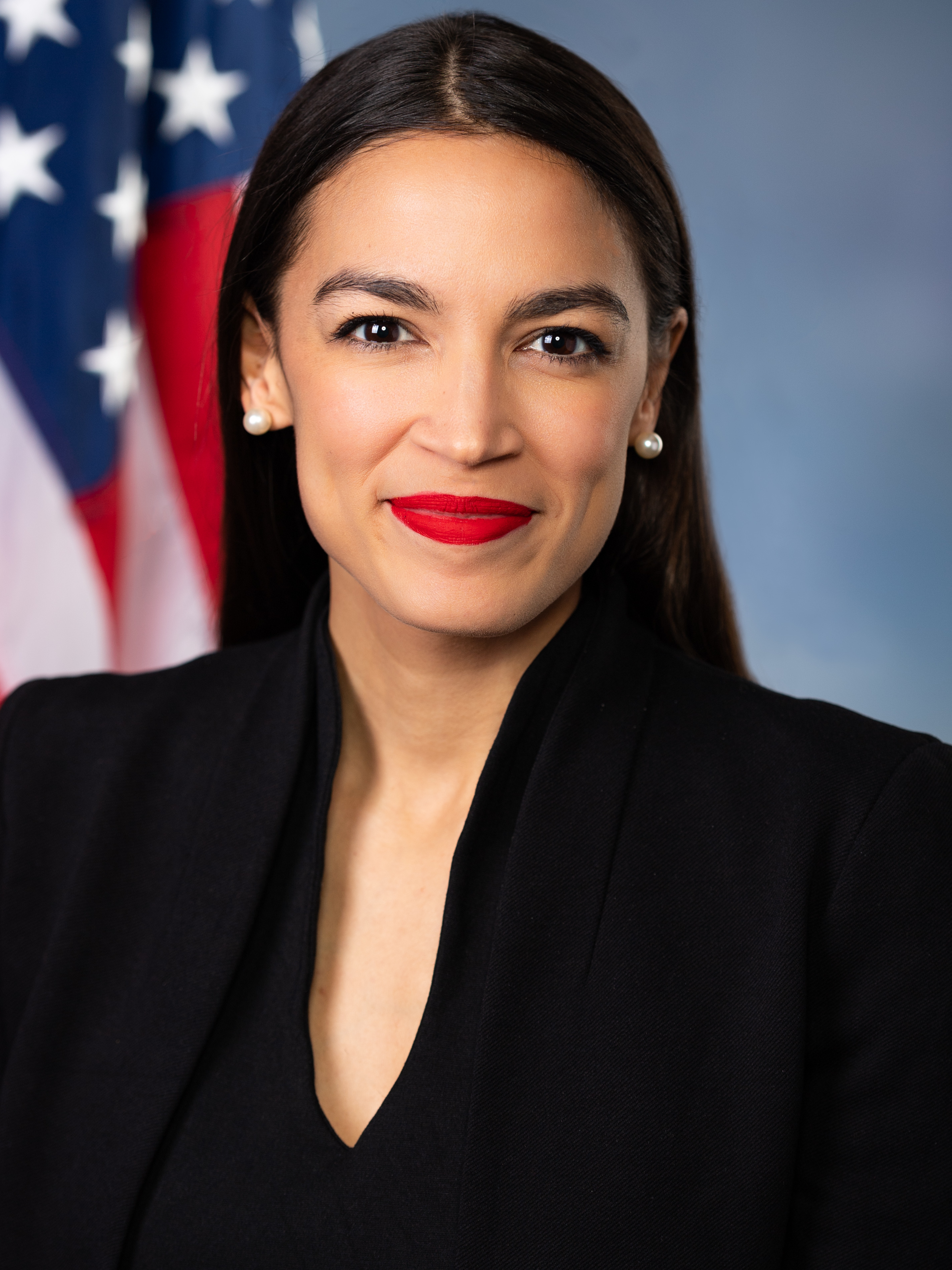
Alexandria Ocasio-Cortez, a member of the U.S. House of Representatives, was one of the first U.S. lawmakers to criticize Ticketmaster following the website crash.

Following widespread social media posts by customers upset with the website crash, several U.S. lawmakers and consumer groups took notice of the issue. On November 15, 2022, Alexandria Ocasio-Cortez, the U.S. representative for New York's 14th congressional district, tweeted that Ticketmaster is a monopoly and that its merger with Live Nation Entertainment must be broken up. Ocasio-Cortez has always been a "staunch objector" to the company's merger, according to CNBC. Bill Pascrell, the U.S. representative for New Jersey's 9th congressional district, criticized the merger of Ticketmaster and Live Nation, and stated that he attempted to purchase tickets but was waitlisted. He also underscored that he had previously petitioned in 2021 the United States Attorney General, Merrick Garland, in support of "strong antitrust enforcement by the [Joe] Biden Administration", along with House members Frank Pallone, Jerry Nadler, Jan Schakowsky, and David Cicilline in a joint letter. Richard Blumenthal, the senior senator from Connecticut, also urged for a federal probe into the competition in the live venue music industry. He said the fiasco "is a perfect example of how the Live Nation/Ticketmaster merger harms consumers by creating a near-monopoly."

Senator Amy Klobuchar, chair of the Senate Judiciary Subcommittee on Competition Policy, Antitrust and Consumer Rights, penned an open letter to the CEO of Ticketmaster, Rapino, regarding her "serious concerns" over the company's operations. She wrote, "Ticketmaster's power in the primary ticket market insulates it from the competitive pressures that typically push companies to innovate and improve their services. That can result in the types of dramatic service failures we saw this week, where consumers are the ones that pay the price." On November 17, the Pennsylvania Attorney General, Josh Shapiro, announced he is accepting consumer complaints regarding the issue and asked Pennsylvanians to submit their complaints on his website. The Tennessee Attorney General, Jonathan Skrmetti, initiated an investigation into "consumer complaints about chaos during the presale of tickets" to the tour. He said in a press conference that "a lack of competition [for Ticketmaster] has led to a poor experience and higher prices for consumers." The attorneys general of Nevada and North Carolina also began investigating Live Nation–Ticketmaster on the grounds of consumer rights violations.

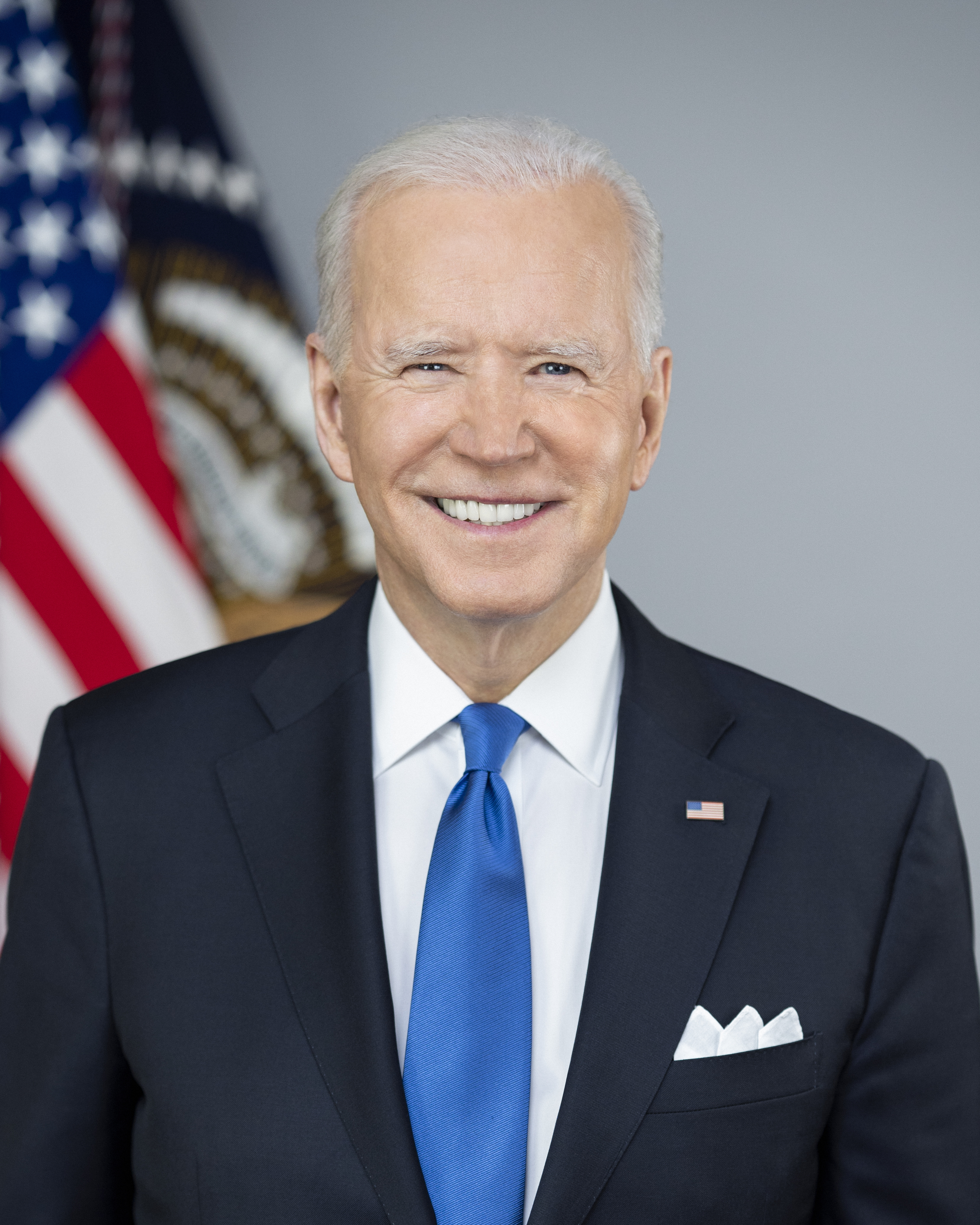
Joe Biden, the President of the U.S., pushed Ticketmaster and other ticket-selling companies to abandon junk fees detrimental to consumers.

On November 18, Pascrell, co-signed by 30 other House Democrats, (Note: Chuy Garcia, Bonnie Watson Coleman, Barbara Lee, Emanuel Cleaver, Ocasio-Cortez, Brendan Boyle, Rashida Tlaib, John Garamendi, Shontel Brown, Marcy Kaptur, Jimmy Panetta, Kathy Castor, Donald Beyer, Donald Payne, Jr., Ilhan Omar, Sanford Bishop, Ann Kirkpatrick, Jamaal Bowman, Earl Blumenauer, Katie Porter, Gerry Connolly, Rosa DeLauro, David Trone, Steven Cohen, Mondaire Jones, Josh Gottheimer, Seth Moulton, Mike Doyle, Al Green, Andy Kim, and Jamie Raskin.) petitioned the federal Department of Justice to open a formal investigation into the issue. Subsequently, The New York Times stated that the Department of Justice had previously opened an antitrust investigation into Live Nation Entertainment and Ticketmaster. On November 19, Representative Cicilline, who chairs the House Judiciary Subcommittee on Antitrust, Commercial and Administrative Law, urged the Department of Justice to investigate and break up the companies. He tweeted that "Ticketmaster's excessive wait times and fees are completely unacceptable, as seen with today's" and "It's no secret that Live Nation–Ticketmaster is an unchecked monopoly." The White House Press Secretary, Karine Jean-Pierre, declined to comment on a potential investigation into the fiasco, but stated that the U.S. President, Joe Biden, "has been crystal clear on this", quoting his comment on the issue: "capitalism without competition isn't capitalism, it's exploitation." Biden subsequently tweeted that "Millions of Americans will travel home for the holidays and will get hit with hidden 'junk' fees from airlines, hotels—maybe even tickets for a holiday show the family wants to see. It isn't right. My Administration is taking actions to reduce or eliminate these surprise fees."

On November 23, Klobuchar and Mike Lee, the senior senator from Utah, announced that the U.S. Senate antitrust panel will hold a hearing to address Ticketmaster and Live Nation's "lack of competition in the industry". It was later announced on January 18, 2023, that the hearing is set for January 24. On November 29, Blumenthal and Senator Marsha Blackburn wrote a letter to the Federal Trade Commission (FTC), posing questions about the agency's "plans to fight the use of bots in ticketing", and requesting to enforce the Better Online Tickets Sales Act (BOTS Act), which is a 2016 federal law that grants the U.S. government "the authority to crack down on those who misuse bots—software applications that are programmed to run automated tasks online—to buy large amounts of tickets for profit ... and bans the resale of tickets bought using bots, and people who illegally sell the tickets face a $16,000 fine." The letter also highlighted the "wild" ticket prices at third-party sites, as high as $1,000 for a Bruce Springsteen concert and $40,000 for Adele, stating "preventing this type of consumer harm is exactly why Congress chose to enact the BOTS Act six years ago and why we both chose to sponsor that bill." On December 6, the FTC chair, Lina Khan, told on The Wall Street Journal's CEO Council Summit that companies like Ticketmaster can become "too big to care", and clarified that it was the Justice Department that approved the 2010 merger. She assured that the department "continues to look at this" and added that the controversy "ended up converting more Gen Zers into anti-monopolists overnight than anything I could have done."

In June 2023, media outlets reported that, following a meeting with Biden and the FTC, Ticketmaster, SeatGeek, and other ticketing companies agreed to abolish "junk fees"—extra costs added on at the end of ticket purchases, and to show consumers the fee breakdown upfront. Biden and National Economic Council director Lael Brainard made a press statement at the White House on June 15, 2023, highlighting the push to prohibit such deceptive, surprise fees federally, applying to resorts and rentals as well. American legal scholar William Kovacic, a former FTC chair, called it the "Taylor Swift policy adjustment." In November 2023, the Senate Subcommittee on Investigations issued a subpoena to Ticketmaster and Live Nation "for documents related to the company's ticket pricing, fees, and resale practices" following a months-long inquiry. Blumenthal, chair of the subcommittee, said the subpoena was in response to Live Nation's "egregiously stonewall[ing]" of the inquiry. A Live Nation spokesperson said in a statement that the company "voluntarily worked with the Subcommittee from the start and provid[ed] extensive information". In April 2024, The Wall Street Journal reported that the Department of Justice was preparing to file an antitrust lawsuit against Live Nation. On December 17, 2024, the FTC officially passed the Junk Fees Rule to ban "unfair and deceptive pricing practices" that hide total prices for various industries, including short-term lodging.

In March 2025, U.S. president Donald Trump signed an executive order directing the FTC to crack down on price gouging by ticket resellers. In August, the FTC sued the ticket reseller Key Investment Group, accusing the company of violating the BOTS Act and the FTC Act by using fake or purchased Ticketmaster accounts to evade purchasing limits, then resell the tickets for a markup. The FTC said the company made more than $1.2 million reselling 2,280 Eras Tour tickets it bought in 2023.

==== Senate committee hearing ====
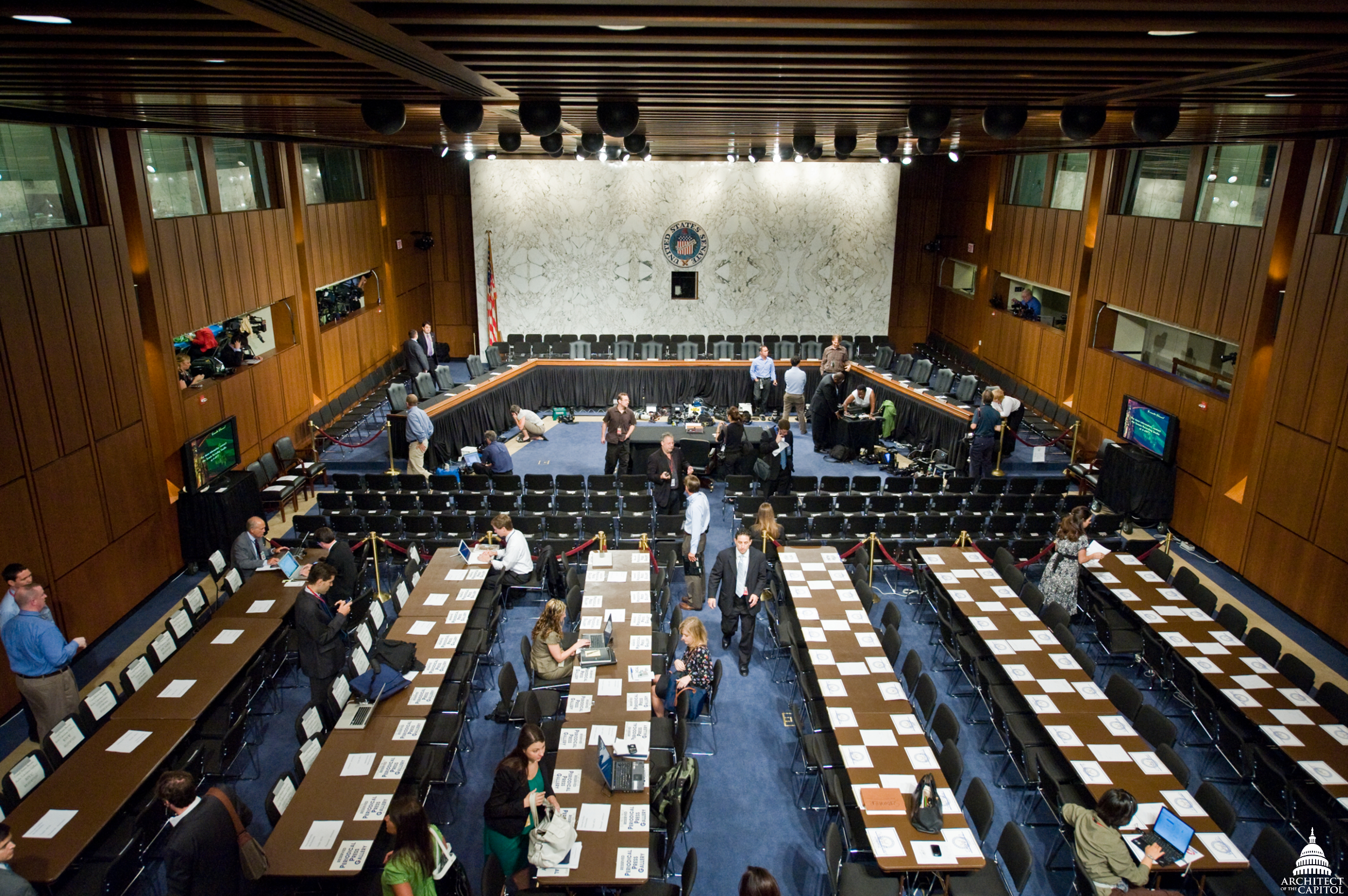
The U.S. Senate Judiciary Subcommittee on Competition Policy, Antitrust and Consumer Rights censured Ticketmaster in a hearing at the Hart Senate Office Building, Washington, D.C., on January 24, 2023.

The three-hour hearing of the issue by the Senate judiciary committee was titled "That's the Ticket: Promoting Competition and Protecting Consumers in Live Entertainment", to analyze "the long-simmering dissatisfaction over the 2010 consent decree governing the merger of Ticketmaster and Live Nation". The hearing was telecast live. Various media outlets reported that both the Democrat and Republican senators "grilled" Ticketmaster's representative, Joe Berchtold, the company's chief financial officer. The senators questioned Berchtold over Ticketmaster's monopolistic practices, policies, ticket costs, lack of transparency, lack of defense against bots, and insensitivity to music artists. Berchtold, despite apologizing for the debacle, denied accusations of monopoly and fraud, but accepted that "there are several things we could have done better—including staggering the sales over a longer period of time and doing a better job setting fan expectations for getting tickets" and continued to blame "industrial-scale ticket scalping" and "unprecedented number of bots". The witnesses prosecuting Ticketmaster included Jerry Mickelson, the president of JAM Creative Productions; and Jack Groetzinger, co-founder of SeatGeek. Live Nation cited several letters of support within its testimony, including one from American country singer Garth Brooks. Several senators also quoted Swift's lyrics in their arguments, including her 2022 single "Anti-Hero". Free Britney America, a D.C. organization that was part of the Free Britney movement, protested outside the U.S. Capitol during the hearing "in support of ending Ticketmaster-Live Nation's monopoly over the live event and ticketing industry."

External videos
- WATCH LIVE: Senate hearing on Ticketmaster business practices following Taylor Swift ticket issues – via PBS NewsHour on YouTube.

Following the hearing, Billboard stated that politicians of both the political parties, who see criticizing Ticketmaster as a "winning political issue and an opportunity to reach constituents who have long complained about the ticketing giant", are more of a threat to Ticketmaster than Swift herself. According to the magazine, the senators' perspective during the hearing is that "if the Live Nation-owned platform didn't have such market dominance (around 80% of large venues in the U.S. have exclusive Ticketmaster deals), greater competition would force the company to innovate and improve its services—potentially avoiding the kinds of issues that spoiled the Swift sale", and added that Ticketmaster is widely "despised" by the public, making an "easy target for rare bipartisan political action". The Washington Post columnist Helaine Olen opined the Ticketmaster fiasco "was so bad it united the parties", whereas CNN journalist Allison Morrow wrote in an article titled "One Nation, Under Swift" that Swift's fans have united the two parties in a way "the Founding Fathers failed to anticipate".

==== Bills and legislation ====
The controversy and "Swift's star power" has inspired a string of law bills. According to Carolyn Sloane, assistant professor of economics of the University of California, Riverside, the fiasco spurred mass political action because Swift "has scaled her talent through demographic technology".

On the federal level, Klobuchar and Blumenthal proposed the Unlocking Tickets Markets Act in the U.S. Senate; it would grant the Federal Trade Commission the power to prevent "excessively long" exclusive contracts and open the market to more ticket-selling companies than just one like Ticketmaster. Pascrell and Frank Pallone proposed BOSS and SWIFT Act (Better Oversight of Stub Sales and Strengthening Well Informed and Fair Transactions for Audiences of Concert Ticketing) in the U.S. House, requiring ticket-sellers to disclose the total cost, including a breakdown of fees, the total number of tickets offered for sale within seven days of an event, and prohibit promoters or venue employees from reselling tickets at elevated prices. Ted Cruz, Maria Cantwell, Jan Schakowsky and Gus Bilirakis proposed the TICKET Act (Transparency In Charges for Key Events Ticketing Act) in both houses of Congress, requiring ticket platforms to display the full price in advertising and marketing materials and disclose "speculative tickets"—the tickets the seller does not possess when making the sale. In December 2023, the U.S. Senate introduced the Fans First Act, authored by Klobuchar, Blackburn, John Cornyn, Ben Ray Luján, Roger Wicker and Peter Welch, to address the hidden fees, scalping bots, and a lack of clarity on whether a ticket is being sold by the primary seller or a third-party.

The issue inspired several U.S. states to legislate on the matter as well. The New York State Assembly enacted a bill in December 2022 proposed by member Kenny Burgos "to crack down on scalping and control the ticket-resale market." In the Washington State Legislature, Representative Kristine Reeves debuted in January 2023 the TSWIFT Consumer Protection Act, which mandates the prohibition of bots or software to buy tickets and restrictions on dynamic pricing. When the bill stalled, Reeves claimed that Ticketmaster has hired lobbyists to "kill" her bill and she "hopes to redraft the measure in the next legislative session." The Minnesota House of Representatives passed the "House File 1989" bill—the title being a reference to Swift's 2014 album 1989—to require Ticketmaster and other companies to reveal all the prices and fees upfront. Members of the Massachusetts General Court introduced the "Taylor Swift Bill" in March 2023 that mandates ticketing companies to disclose full ticket costs upfront and outlaw dynamic pricing in the state. Texas governor Greg Abbott signed the "Save Our Swifties" bill into law in May 2023, banning the use of bots and other technology to bulk-purchase concert tickets. Violation will elicit a penalty of up to $10,000 for every ticket purchase. The California State Assembly passed Bill 8, sponsored by Laura Friedman, Jacqui Irwin and Scott Wilk, that requires ticket sellers to disclose the total prices upfront. In a statement to The Washington Post, Ticketmaster refused to comment on any alleged negotiations with lawmakers regarding the bills, but noted it had to "ramp up our engagement with policymakers because they are being inundated with misinformation peddled by scalpers."

=== Lawsuits ===
==== Barfuss v. Live Nation Entertainment and Ticketmaster ====
A group of fans, consisting of 26 plaintiffs across the U.S., filed a lawsuit on December 2, 2022, in the Los Angeles County Superior Court, against Ticketmaster and Live Nation for "intentional deception", "fraud, price fixing and antitrust violations". It demanded a civil penalty of $2500 for every violation of the California Unfair Competition Law, alongside plaintiffs seeking the costs of legal fees, and any additional relief the court deems fit. Since the lawsuit was filed, about 150 more fans have expressed interest in signing on to it, according to the group's attorney, Jennifer Kinder. Kinder told The Washington Post, "Ticketmaster messed with the wrong fan base." The lawsuit also alleged that Ticketmaster "carved out small territories" for competitors like SeatGeek to conceal "the level of monopolistic power and control" the company has, intentionally permitted scalpers and bots to access the presale, and "gave more codes than it had tickets." The lawsuit also named Los Angeles County, where Ticketmaster is headquartered, as a defendant.

Julie Barfuss, the lead plaintiff, said that after trying to purchase tickets numerous times unsuccessfully, Barfuss chatted with a customer service worker who told her that the system considered Barfuss a bot for attempting to buy tickets 41 times. Barfuss's card also was declined 41 times, charging her an additional sum of $14,286.70 due to the purchase attempts. The court subsequently suspended the lawsuit on the grounds that the plaintiffs agreed to settle the dispute in arbitration, but the case was re-opened by the U.S. Court of Appeals for the Ninth Circuit after plaintiffs argued that they were being "misled" with an unclear arbitration agreement from Live Nation. The federal appeals court ruled that the plaintiffs have "waived their right to sue." Media outlets then reported that both parties have agreed to take the case to a formal trial in the United States District Court for the Central District of California, with the first hearing on March 28, 2023; some plaintiffs held signs outside the court campus during the hearing.

==== Sterioff v. Live Nation Entertainment and Ticketmaster ====
On December 20, another lawsuit, a federal class action, was filed in the U.S. District Court for the Central District of California, by a Swift fan named Michelle Sterioff, accusing Live Nation–Ticketmaster of "intentionally and purposefully" violating antitrust laws and misleading "millions of fans" into believing that they would prevent bots and scalpers from participating in the ticket sale. The lawsuit mentions violations of California Consumers Legal Remedies Act, Unfair Competition Law, False Advertising Law, "quasi-contract/restitution/unjust enrichment", and various others. Sterioff demanded the court for injunctive relief, statutory damages, punitive damages, and legal fees, among others.

In a filing on February 24, Live Nation asked the judge to dismiss the class action and instead force the plaintiff to be heard privately in arbitration, citing the federal appeals court ruling in the Barfuss suit that upheld arbitration. Reuters opined that companies usually favor arbitration over court llitigation to attempt resolving issues quickly and reduce potential damages. In August 2023, both parties agreed to put the case on hold, agreeing "to continue their ongoing settlement discussions through mediation." On December 12, 2023, a voluntary dismissal notice was submitted by Sterioff, asking to terminate lawsuit. Rolling Stone opined that "it's unclear if any kind of settlement has been reached in the suit."

==== United States v. Live Nation Entertainment and Ticketmaster ====
Map showing the 29 U.S. states and the District of Columbia that have co-signed the lawsuit by the United States Department of Justice against Live Nation–Ticketmaster (Note: The states participating in the lawsuit are Arizona, Arkansas, California, Colorado, Connecticut, Florida, Illinois, Maryland, Massachusetts, Michigan, Minnesota, Nevada, New Hampshire, New Jersey, New York, North Carolina, Ohio, Oklahoma, Oregon, Pennsylvania, Rhode Island, South Carolina, Tennessee, Texas, Virginia, Washington, West Virginia, Wisconsin and Wyoming.)

In May 2024, the U.S. Department of Justice launched an antitrust lawsuit against Live Nation–Ticketmaster, calling for a dissolution of the merger. The case was filed at the United States District Court for the Southern District of New York. The United States Assistant Attorney General, Jonathan Kanter, said in a statement to press that "the live music industry in America is broken because Live Nation-Ticketmaster has an illegal monopoly" and that the lawsuit seeks to remove the monopoly to benefit fans and artists alike. Rolling Stone reported that a lawsuit from the department "has been one of the most anticipated potential legal actions in the live music industry" since the department's investigation of the merger was officially confirmed in 2022. Additionally, a day after the case was filed, a consumer case seeking $5 billion in damages from Live Nation Entertainment on potentially millions of individuals who purchased tickets through Ticketmaster was also filed in the same court.

On April 15, 2026, a federal jury based in New York found that Live Nation was liable on the states' antitrust claims, concluding that the company held an illegal monopoly over live events industry which enabled it to overcharge ticket consumers.

=== Felony arrests ===
In March 2025, two hackers— Tyrone Rose and Shamara P. Simmons—were arrested and arraigned in New York City for stealing and reselling over 900 concert tickets of the Eras Tour, earning $635,000 in illegal profits. They were charged with grand larceny, computer tampering, money laundering, and conspiracy. According to the district attorney Melinda Katz, Rose and Simmons were employed by Sunderland, a third-party contractor for StubHub in Kingston, Jamaica. The accomplices used their access to StubHub's systems to intercept tickets. Katz claimed that they stole URLs for already-sold tickets and posted the tickets on StubHub, reselling them for profit from June 2022 to July 2023. Simmons passed away. In October 2025, Rose pled guilty to a single count of grand larceny in the second degree over the scalping scheme, while a sentencing hearing on that charge was set for January 2026.

== Media reception ==
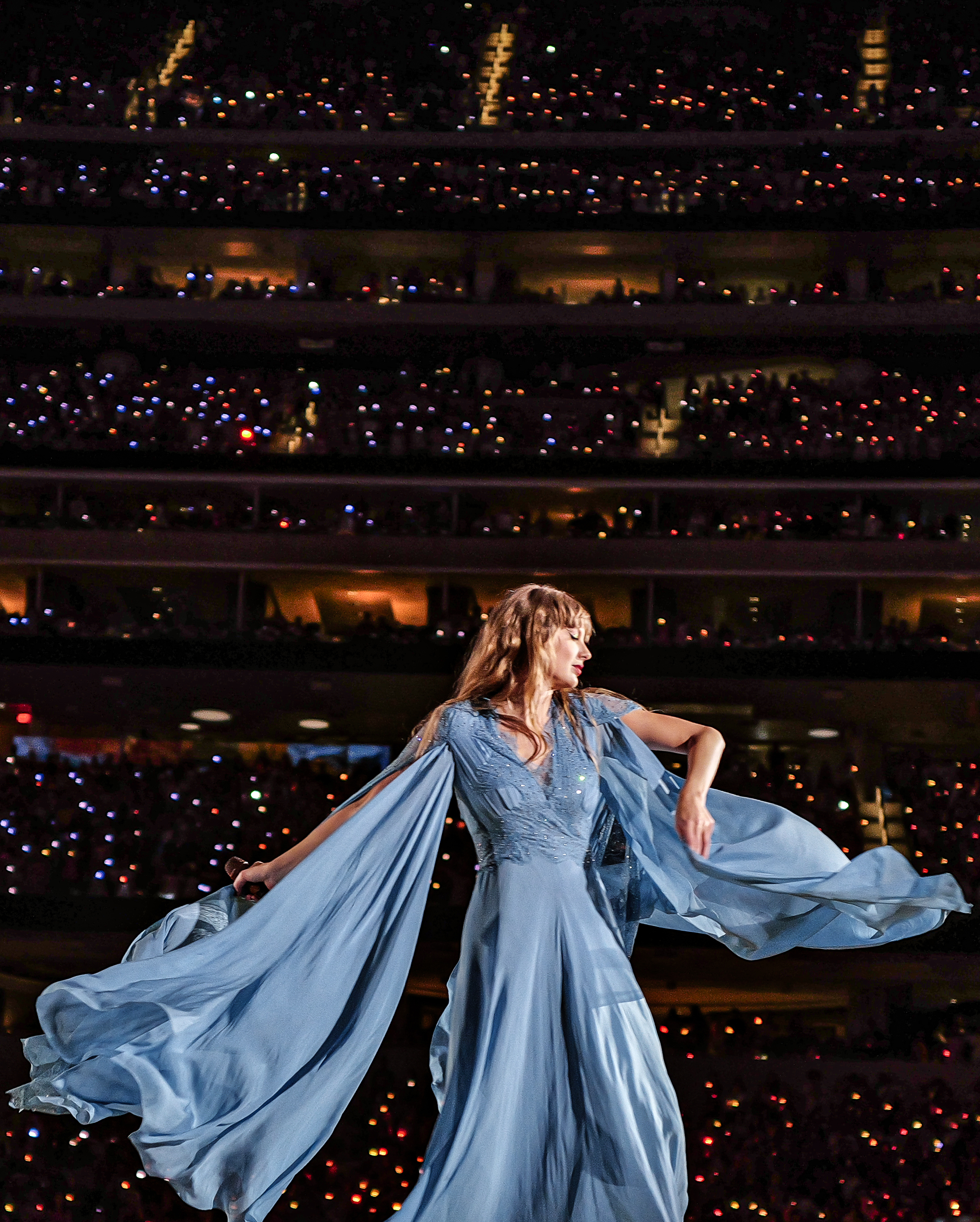
Swift performing on the final date (August 9, 2023) of the first U.S. leg of the Eras Tour

Various journalists highlighted the spotlight the controversy brought on monopolies and how it could bode well for the music industry. Most publications called it "the Taylor Swift Ticketmaster fiasco". Fortune said the controversy "set off a fan political movement to take down Ticketmaster". Pitchfork asked, "Is there any other artist who could force urgency into the federal investigation of a music industry monopoly just by going on tour?" Arwa Mahdawi wrote in The Guardian, "Swift has had an incredibly impressive career. But you know what? If she gets people to sit up and pay attention to the disgraceful state of antitrust laws in the U.S., I reckon that will be her finest achievement." Brooke Schultz of Associated Press discussed how Swift's fans magnified a website crash into a political movement and considered them an influential voter demographic during elections: "the sheer power and size of Swift's fandom has spurred conversations about economic inequality, merely symbolized by Ticketmaster". Variety noted that Ticketmaster–Live Nation did not admit culpability for the issue, "unapologetically defending itself" against federal investigation and only apologizing after "a resultant drop in Live Nation shares of nearly 8% in trading Friday (November 18, 2022)."

American concert business publication Pollstar projected Swift to gross a $728 million sum across her 52 U.S. dates and "a mind-boggling billion dollars" internationally, surpassing Ed Sheeran's all-time record with less than half of his ÷ Tour's 255 dates; it would become the first tour in history to gross a billion-dollar sum. The publication wrote, "To put it another way: if Taylor Swift was a country and its economy was solely based on ticket sales, it would be the 199th largest economy on earth, equivalent to a small Caribbean nation."

A December 2022 episode of Impact, a weekly program by Nightline on Hulu that provides "an in-depth look at the stories and issues dominating the zeitgeist" by spotlighting the "real people being impacted by the issue", titled "Taylor's Ticketmaster Disaster", focused on the controversy.

=== Press investigation ===
On December 8, 2022, Slate published a critical discourse analysis of the controversy, and concluded that Swift's fans are right about Ticketmaster "screwing them over" for profit. Statistical data, of a sample size of over 2,200 users, showed that those who had the special Verified Fan "boosts"—including codes offered to customers who had previously bought tickets to the canceled Lover Fest and were supposed to be prioritized—were less successful in securing tickets than those who did not have any type of boosts. The report concluded "It appears boosts not only didn't help, they actively harmed", but also underscored that the boosting "worked as expected" for SeatGeek users only.

On December 12, The Wall Street Journal, citing "people familiar with the matter", published data about the crash. It said that there were 2.6 million seats for the tour, for which 3.5 million people registered through the fan program, 1.5 million of whom got the pre-sale codes, which would generally translate to 1.8 million tickets sold. Instead, 12 million unique entities, including scalper bots, visited the website that day, and gave 3.5 billion user requests to the site, leading to the crash; 2.4 million tickets were sold before the website completely crashed, and 163,300 tickets that had been allocated for the canceled general sale remain—six percentage of the total seats. The Wall Street Journal also opined that if Ticketmaster had not opened a bulk of the tickets to sale on a single day and had rather split the sale in a staggered manner over several days based on venues, similar to what the platform did for the Reputation Stadium Tour, the pre-sale would not have crashed.

On January 3, 2023, The Guardian reported that Live Nation–Ticketmaster is spending "big" on its lobbying campaign on the Department of Justice, as well as legislations aimed at "greater transparency around ticket sales."

On January 23, The Los Angeles Times published an article titled "How Ticketmaster became the most hated name in music", in which it claimed that a "high-ranking concert executive", speaking on condition of anonymity, stated that "Ticketmaster erred in placing all the Eras tickets on sale at once and allowing fans to pick their own seats, which led to bottlenecked traffic" and that "the Verified Fan database was rife with resellers with fake email addresses."

=== Legacy ===
Forbes and The Hollywood Reporter named Swift as one of 2022's most powerful women in entertainment. Entertainment Weekly listed "Swifties vs. Ticketmaster" as one of the biggest pop culture moments of 2022. The magazine's Allaire Nuss wrote, "If there was ever an artist with enough pop-culture prowess to bring down the music industry's most hated monopoly, it's Taylor Swift." Due to the controversy, The Washington Post proclaimed that 2022 is another year Swift dominated, maintaining "an unbreakable hold on our increasingly fractured world—and its discourse—in a way that almost no one else can." Vox depicted the controversy in its year-end montage summarizing the important world events of 2022. The A.V. Club listed "Ticketmaster faces the wrath of the Swifties" as one of the 30 biggest popular culture news stories of 2022.

== Further controversy ==
Following the controversy, Ticketmaster's technical failures in various other concert tours have received media attention and fan criticism, often compared to the U.S. Eras Tour fiasco. In December 2022, Ticketmaster once again faced controversy after an "unprecedented" number of people were sold fake tickets to the Mexico City dates of the World's Hottest Tour, the 2022 concert tour by Puerto Rican rapper-singer Bad Bunny. The platform said the fake tickets "caused temporary intermittence in the access control system, which unfortunately impeded the identification of legitimate tickets for some moments." Ricardo Sheffield, the head of Mexico's consumer protection agency, stated in a Radio Fórmula interview that Ticketmaster would be forced to pay a fine of up to 10 percent of its 2021 earnings in addition to "compensation of no less than 20% of the price paid." On December 26, 2022, American country singer Zach Bryan criticized Ticketmaster for the handling of his Burn Burn Burn Tour and listed out non-transferrable tickets to stop scalpers. He went on to release a live album, entitled All My Homies Hate Ticketmaster.

In February 2023, American singer Beyoncé announced her ninth concert tour, the Renaissance World Tour, in which she also partnered with Ticketmaster. The news created concerns on social media over Ticketmaster's reliability, with fans fearing a fiasco similar to Swift's. However, Ticketmaster released a statement claiming the demand for the Renaissance World Tour is "expected to be high" and pledged to implement a "multistep verification process" to ensure tickets are being sold to the concertgoers rather than scalpers. The company would continue to sell tickets via its Verified Fan program for the North American leg of the tour, but replace the at-large on-sale (as with Swift's case) with a staggered sale, as well as not initially scheduling a public on-sale.

In March 2023, fans of Canadian music artist Drake also filed a class action lawsuit against Ticketmaster in the Superior Court of Quebec, alleging intentional deception and fraud. Plaintiffs claimed that the on-sale for the It's All a Blur Tour, a co-headlining concert tour by Drake and 21 Savage, "intentionally misleads consumers for [Ticketmaster's] own financial gain" by concealing information about additional show dates to drive demand and ticket prices. The suit seeks $300 in punitive damages per customer and compensatory damages covering the difference between the "Official Platinum" ticket prices and the regular cost for the seats.

For the Eurovision Song Contest 2023 in Liverpool in May 2023, the European Broadcasting Union (EBU) and the host broadcaster BBC partnered with Ticketmaster. Prior to the ticket booking platform going live, many users complained that the Ticketmaster website had crashed with a 500 error. Tickets for the contest's final sold out in 36 minutes, with the remaining available shows selling out around an hour later. Following this, tickets were available on third-party resale platforms such as Viagogo, with a general admission standing ticket for the final, originally priced at £380, being sold for up to £11,800.

In June 2023, the Eras Tour's Paris and Lyon dates registered the highest demand ever for a presale in France. Angelo Gopee, head of Live Nation France, stated, "the demand is such that many have found themselves in a virtual queue just to subscribe to the mailing list which, potentially, will open access to the ticket office. From memory, we had never seen that in France". Ticketmaster halted the French presales on July 11, 2023, following login glitches. In July 2023, the United Kingdom ticket sale of the Eras Tour was handled by Ticketmaster and AXS. Forbes reported widespread scalping of the tour's UK tickets, with immediate re-listing on sites like StubHub and Viagogo for extortionate prices, in addition to website crashes. Kevin Brennan, a Member of Parliament from Cardiff, demanded a debate in the UK House of Commons on ticket scalpers and the government's plan to tackle them.

== See also ==
- Taylor Swift masters dispute
- 2009 MTV Video Music Awards
- Taylor Swift sexual assault trial
- Taylor Swift vs Scooter Braun: Bad Blood
- Death of Ana Clara Benevides
- Taylor Swift deepfake pornography controversy
