= Pollstar =

American trade publication

- Categories: Trade magazine
- Frequency: Weekly
- Founded: 1981
- Company: Oak View Group
- Country: United States
- Based in: Los Angeles, California
- Language: English
- Website: pollstar.com
- ISSN: 1067-6945

Pollstar is a trade publication for the concert and live music industry. The publication was purchased by Oak View Group, a venue consultancy founded by Tim Leiweke and Irving Azoff, in July 2017. Pollstar holds an annual award ceremony to honor artists and professionals in the concert industry.

== History and profile ==
Founded in 1981 in Fresno, California, Pollstar is a trade publication that covers the concert industry in the United States and internationally. They supply information to professional concert promoters, booking agents, artist managers, facility executives and other entities involved in the live entertainment business. Pollstar produces a weekly print magazine for industry professionals and publishes on their website.

Pollstar previously operated a separate website for professionals, but later announced it would merge the site with Pollstar.com. Today, Pollstar has an office in London and correspondents in six countries. The magazine is a member of the Associated Press (AP). Its subscribers receive the weekly magazine and access to its online databases.

In May 2018, Pollstar announced it was moving its headquarters from Fresno to Los Angeles. In April 2018, co-founder and editor-in-chief Gary Bongiovani retired from the publication. Pollstar produces Pollstar Live!, a three-day concert industry conference at the Beverly Hilton in Beverly Hills, CA. Originally titled the CIC – Concert Industry Consortium, it brings together a mix of talent buyers, venue managers, artist agents and managers. Conference speakers have included Garth Brooks, Jon Bon Jovi, Eddy Cue, Michael Rapino, and Nicki Minaj.

== Pollstar Awards ==
Since 1990, the publication has given annual Pollstar Awards to companies, venues, artists, tours, and executives in the live entertainment business. The first awards show was hosted by Penn Jillette at Radio City Music Hall in Midtown Manhattan, New York. Initially, winners were chosen by industry voters and, to a lesser extent, by the magazine's subscribers. Since 2019, Pollstar has used box office performance to choose the winners.
