= Mike Davis (American lawyer) =

American conservative

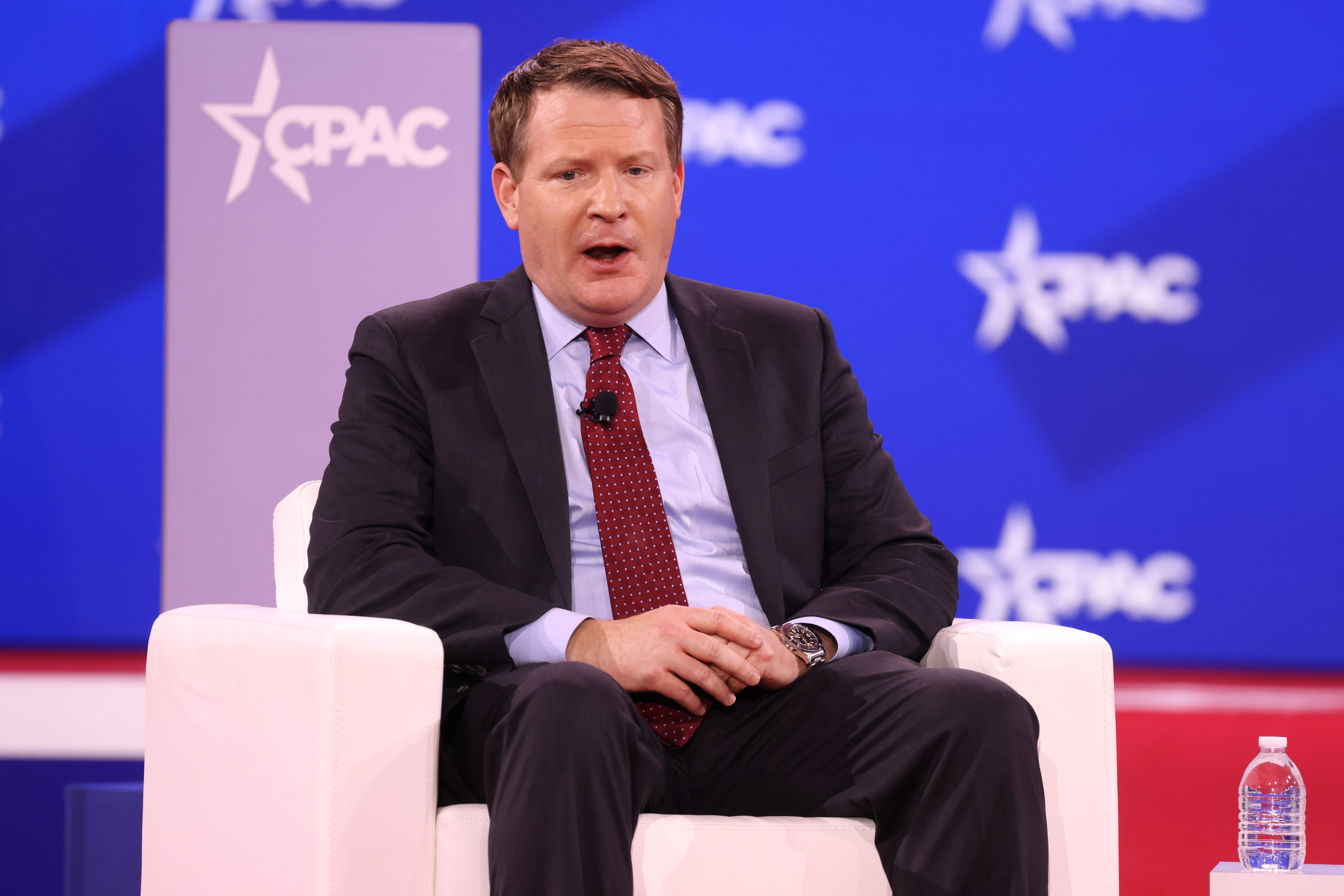
- Davis speaking at CPAC 2025
- Born: September 23, 1977 (age 49)
- Education: University of Iowa (BA, JD)
- Political party: Republican

Mike Davis is an American lawyer, conservative political strategist, and lobbyist. He was Chief Counsel for Nominations to Senate Judiciary Chairman Chuck Grassley and the founder and president of the Article III Project (A3P).

He is a staunch supporter and ally of Donald Trump and was rumored to be one of his candidates for Attorney General. Davis has described himself as "the best fixer in Washington, period. Full stop." Despite having little experience in anti-trust law, Davis was an influential figure in getting controversial mergers approved by the second Donald Trump administration, and spoke frequently to Trump.

In 2026, the Wall Street Journal reported that Davis's clients included companies like Walmart, Hewlett Packard Enterprise and Compass, and that Davis was earning as much as $300,000 a month to protect these firms from anti-trust regulations.

== Early life and education ==
Davis grew up in Des Moines, Iowa and attended Catholic schools. His parents worked in the Des Moines school district.

He received his Bachelor of Arts in political science and a minor in journalism in 2000 and Juris Doctor in 2004, both from the University of Iowa. While in college, he was an intern for Newt Gingrich during the lead-up to President Bill Clinton's impeachment in 1998 and he built a student organization in support of George W. Bush's 2000 presidential campaign.

== Career ==
After law school, he worked on George W. Bush's 2004 re-election campaign, which got him a job, in 2005, in Bush's Office of Political Affairs. There, he met Neil Gorsuch, who helped him land a job at the U.S. Justice Department in 2006 as a special assistant US Attorney. Later Davis gave Gorsuch's resume to the White House as Gorsuch sought a seat on the United States Court of Appeals for the Tenth Circuit – a job he got. After seven months at Justice, Davis started clerking for Gorsuch in Colorado.

In 2007 he stopped clerking and worked for Greenberg Traurig as a litigation associate and, in 2010, he took the same job for the law firm Wheeler Trigg O'Donnell.

In 2012, Davis left Wheeler and started his own law practice, MRDLaw, where he worked until 2017 and then returned to in 2023. His law firm's website claims that from 2013 to 2017 he was also a Special Assistant Attorney General of Colorado.

When Trump was elected president in 2016, Davis pushed to have Gorsuch nominated to fill the Supreme Court vacancy held open by Senate Majority Leader Mitch McConnell; and when Gorsuch was nominated, he campaigned for his confirmation. He then clerked for Gorsuch again during the latter's first four months on the court.

Davis moved from clerking for Gorsuch to the position of Chief Counsel for Nominations for Grassley and other senators on the judiciary committee in July 2017. He was staff lead for 30 hearings and 41 markup meetings over the next two years. He oversaw the floor votes for 278 nominees, including the contentious confirmation of Justice Brett Kavanaugh. He unsuccessfully tried to keep Christine Blasey Ford's testimony accusing Kavanaugh of sexually assaulting her during a party when they were in high school from being heard, but was able to keep Deborah Ramirez, who attended Yale University with Kavanaugh and said he had thrust his penis in her face at a dorm party, from being called to testify. He was also "key in withholding documents relating to Kavanaugh's work in the White House."

Davis left Grassley's staff in January 2019 to create the Article III Project, which claims to defend "constitutionalist judges and the rule of law" and was originally to work closely with the Federalist Society.

In 2020, when Trump's relationship with the Federalist Society frayed over his efforts to overturn the election, Davis took advantage of the opening, distanced himself from them, echoed Trump's calls for "retribution" and during the 2024 campaign vowed to help him pick "fearless" judges who were less impartial.

In 2021, Davis founded the Unsilenced Majority, a group committed to challenging "cancel culture" and pushing back against liberal influencers, alongside the Internet Accountability Project (IAP), which advocates for stricter oversight of Big Tech. The Article III Project and the Internet Accountability Project together raised about $1 million as of 2022, of which nearly $700,000 was routed to Davis or to a business he owns, according to IRS filings.

For part of 2024, he served on the University of Iowa's Alumni Advisory Board – individuals who gather annually on campus and annually online – but left after Trump was re-elected. They also contribute to a fund that supports the department and assist with various tasks, such as "selecting the undergraduate paper award winners, advising the department on undergraduate programs/internships, and assisting with fundraising for internship programs."

=== Second Donald Trump administration ===
Davis has been characterized as an influential fixer with the second Donald Trump administration, helping his corporate clients achieve favorable deals with the administration. Davis also said he helped place Andrew Ferguson as chairman of the Federal Trade Commission, which also handles antitrust matters.

In 2025, Trump appointed Stephen Kenny the Republican National Committee's lead elections attorney to the White House Counsel's office to work on judicial nominations. Because Kenny is an ally of Davis', it was seen as a sign of the influence Davis would have on lifetime legal appointments.

Davis played an influential role in getting the Trump administration to place Gail Slater in charge of the Justice Department's antitrust division. According to sworn deposition by Roger Alford, a deputy in the Justice Department's antitrust division, Davis threatened Slater unless she approved a settlement deal related to Hewlett Packard Enterprise's $14 billion bid to acquire rival Juniper. Davis was at the time a paid advisor for Hewlett Packard Enterprise. Slater and her team were resistant to approving the settlement. Shortly thereafter, Slater and her deputies were forced out of the Justice Department.

== Controversies ==
Davis is a 2020 election denier.

Media Matters compiled a list of what they called his "racist, misogynistic, and authoritarian remarks" in February 2024.

In the lead-up to the 2024 election, Davis said, "We're going to put kids in cages. It's going to be glorious," and he threatened a "reign of terror" and to throw journalists into the "gulag," though he has said that his extreme rhetoric is meant to troll the left. He also wrote that he wanted to "build a special gulag for leftwing white women. The laundry ward." He also called for indicting President Joe Biden, his son Hunter, and his brother James prior to the pardons for the latter two.

Davis has been kicked off social media several times for "hateful conduct."

In 2024, The Washington Post notified him that his organization was not authorized to raise money in Virginia since August 2022, which he promised to correct.

After the 2024 election, Rolling Stone included him on their "Twelve Worst People in Trump's Orbit" list.

The day after Trump was re-elected, Davis posted, "Here's my current mood: I want to drag their dead political bodies through the streets, burn them, and throw them off the wall. (Legally, politically, and financially, of course.)"

In 2025, after the Supreme Court ruled that it was unconstitutional for the Trump administration to deport undocumented immigrants using the Alien Enemies Act, Davis tweeted, "The Supreme Court still has an illegal injunction on the President of the United States, preventing him from commanding military operations to expel these foreign terrorists," Davis wrote. "The President should house these terrorists near the Chevy Chase Country Club, with daytime release."

== Personal life ==
Davis is a "lapsed" Catholic.
