= Jonathan Kanter =

American lawyer (born 1973)

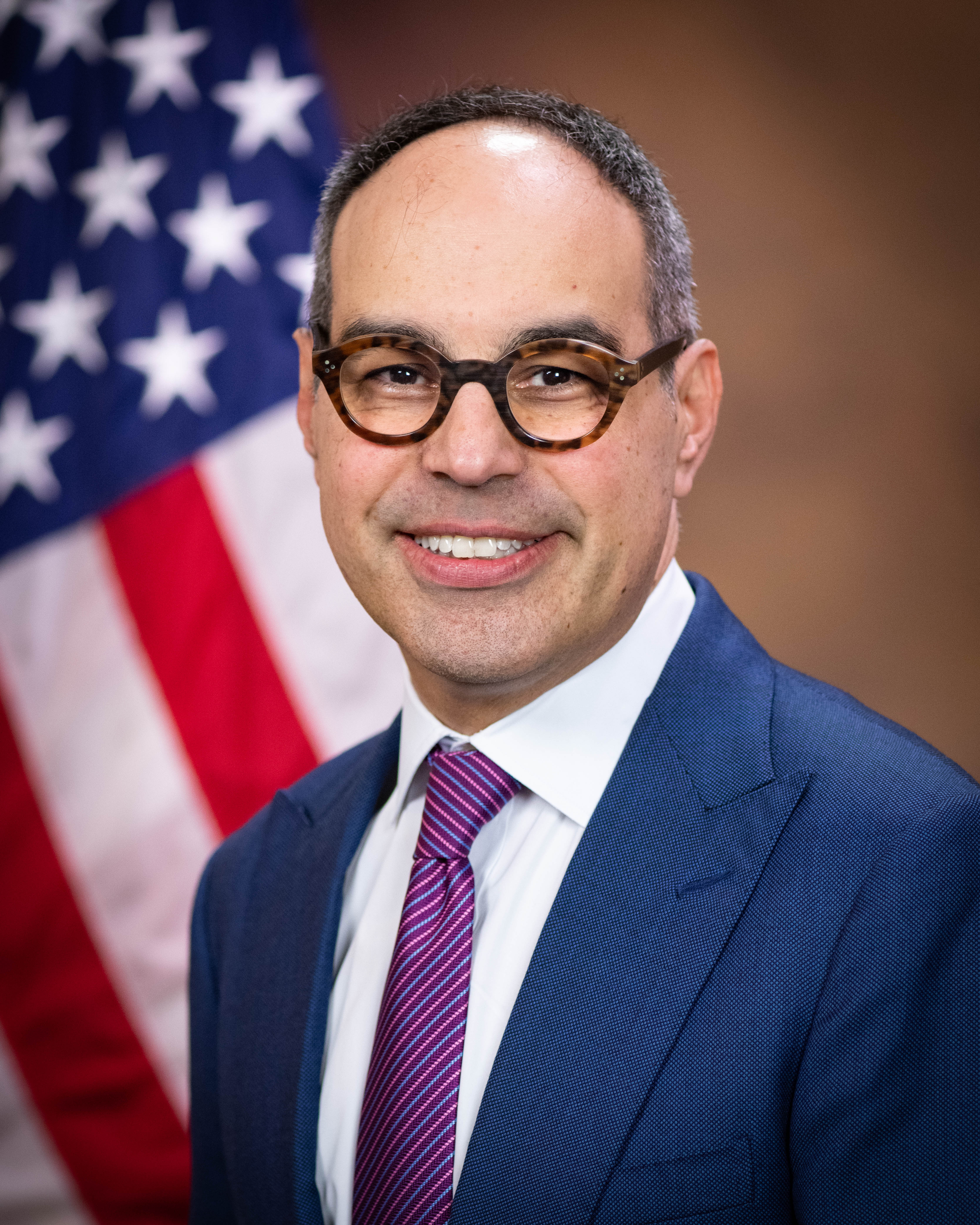

United States Assistant Attorney General for the Antitrust Division
- In office November 16, 2021 – December 20, 2024
- President: Joe Biden
- Preceded by: Makan Delrahim
- Succeeded by: Gail Slater

Personal details
- Born: Jonathan Seth Kanter; July 30, 1973 (age 53) New York City, New York, U.S.
- Education: University at Albany, SUNY (BA); Washington University in St. Louis (JD)

Jonathan Seth Kanter (born July 30, 1973) is an American lawyer who served as Assistant Attorney General for the Antitrust Division of the U.S. Department of Justice (DOJ) from 2021 to 2024, during the administration of President Joe Biden. Kanter previously worked as an antitrust attorney at the Federal Trade Commission (FTC) and in private practice.

Considered a critic of Big Tech, Kanter is closely associated with the anti-monopolistic New Brandeis movement. As assistant attorney general, Kanter has worked with FTC chair Lina Khan on efforts to reform federal merger guidelines. In 2022, the FTC and the DOJ blocked a record number of mergers on anti-trust grounds. During his tenure, the DOJ won its first conviction in a criminal monopolization suit in four decades.

== Early life and education ==
Kanter was born July 30, 1973, in Queens, New York City to elementary school teachers. Kanter's paternal grandfather was an immigrant from Ukraine who worked as a professional plumber. Kanter keeps his citizenship papers in his office. Kanter is Jewish. Kanter graduated from the State University of New York at Albany in 1995 with a Bachelor of Arts and from the Washington University School of Law in 1998 with a Juris Doctor.

== Legal career ==
After graduating from law school, Kanter first worked as an antitrust lawyer at the Federal Trade Commission (FTC) from 1998 to 2000. Kanter later worked in private practice, where he represented clients including Microsoft and Yelp. From 2000 to 2007, he was an associate at Fried, Frank, Harris, Shriver & Jacobson. Kanter was a partner at Cadwalader, Wickersham & Taft from 2007 to 2016, then at Paul, Weiss, Rifkind, Wharton & Garrison from 2016 to 2020. In 2020, he left Paul, Weiss and founded his own law firm, The Kanter Law Group, where he worked until his appointment in 2021 to lead the Justice Department's Antitrust Division.

Currently Kanter is a Distinguished Professor of Policy at Carnegie Mellon and a Distinguished Professor of Law at WashU. He also serves as a contributor to CNBC.

== Assistant Attorney General ==
=== Selection and confirmation ===
According to Politico, Kanter's selection "came after the longest delay for a nominee to lead the office in modern history," following months of speculation surrounding his eventual nomination. On July 20, 2021, Kanter was formally nominated to serve as assistant attorney general in the Department of Justice Antitrust Division. His nomination was endorsed by nine former assistant attorneys general for the Antitrust Division, including Makan Delrahim, who served in the position under Donald Trump.

On October 6, 2021, a hearing on his nomination was held before the Senate Judiciary Committee. On October 28, 2021, his nomination was favorably reported out of committee. On November 16, 2021, Kanter was confirmed by the United States Senate in a 68–29 vote, and was sworn in the same day.

=== Tenure ===
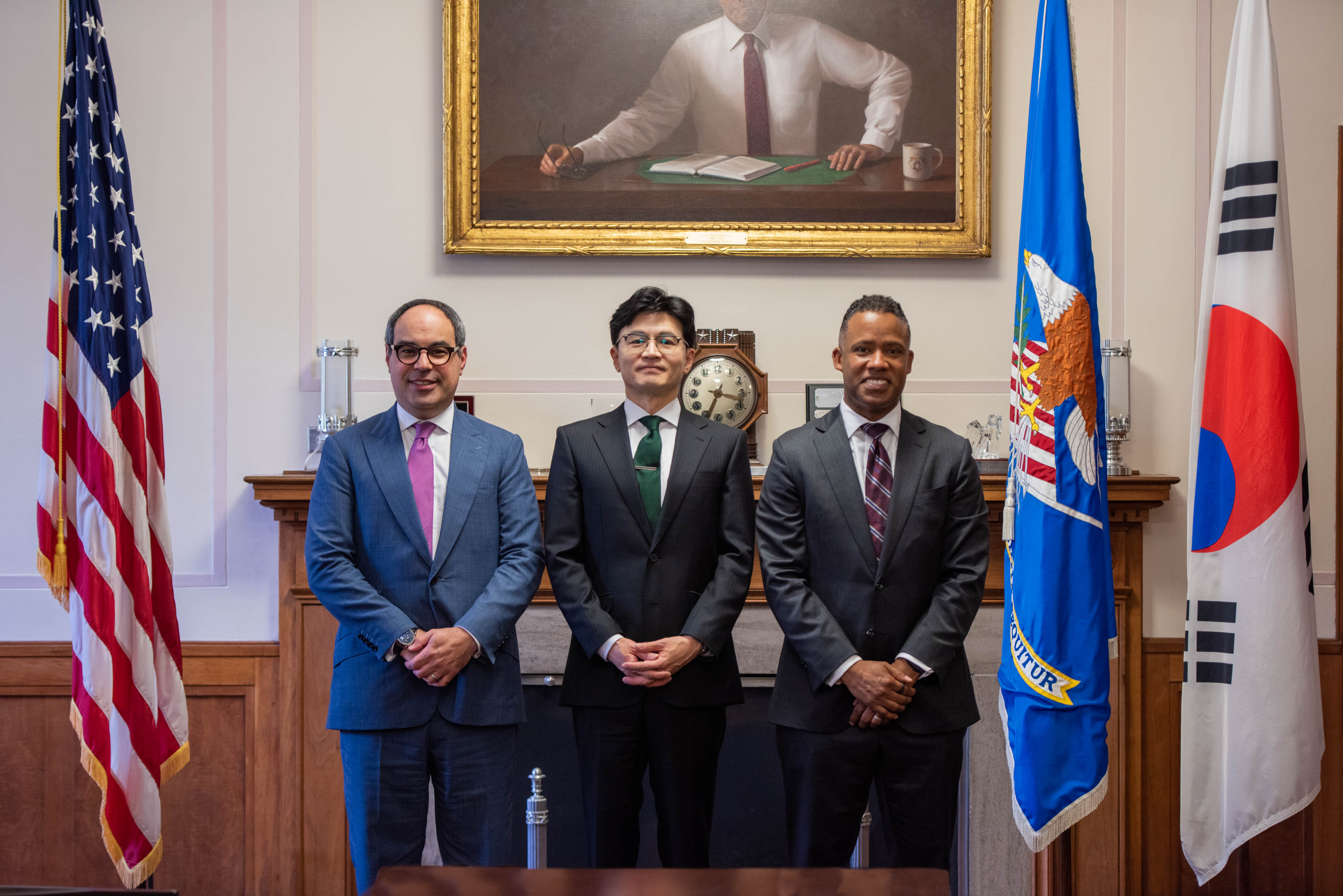
Kanter and Kenneth Polite in 2022 with South Korean Minister of Justice Han Dong Hoon

As assistant attorney general, Kanter has collaborated with FTC Chair Lina Khan on efforts to reform federal merger guidelines. This has been described as a signal that both agencies are set to intensify their scrutiny of large mergers.

According to The National Law Journal, Kanter has largely chosen DOJ and other government officials for staffing positions at the Antitrust Division, which differs from his predecessors, who primarily chose former BigLaw attorneys for these roles. To assist the DOJ as it scrutinizes anti-competitive behavior in digital markets, Kanter has announced that the division will hire more data analysts and other technology experts.

Under Kanter, the DOJ successfully got its first conviction in a criminal monopoly case in over four decades. As assistant attorney general, Kanter presided over the DOJ's first-ever victory in a case over criminal enforcement of labor antitrust violations. In 2024, the DOJ Antitrust Division began scrutinizing the artificial intelligence (AI) market over monopolization concerns. In a 2024 interview, Kanter warned companies to avoid engaging in anti-competitive algorithmic pricing.

In December 2024, Kanter announced that he would resign as Assistant Attorney General effective Friday, December 20, 2024. He was succeeding in an acting capacity by Principal Deputy Attorney General Doha Mekki.

==== Notable cases ====
Following a DOJ antitrust suit, JetBlue's attempted acquisition of Spirit Airlines was terminated in October 2023. Spirit Airlines went bankrupt less than three years later. The New York Times described Kanter as "the trustbuster who has Apple and Google in his sights" in 2024.

Kanter led the DOJ Antitrust Division during the U.S. v. Google trial over Google's search engine practices, with judge Amit Mehta ultimately siding with the DOJ in declaring Google a monopoly. During his time as head of the DOJ Antitrust Division, the DOJ launched a second antitrust lawsuit against Google in 2023, with the suit targeting the company's adtech practices. The DOJ launched an antitrust suit against Apple Inc. in 2024 that accused the company of engaging in anti-competitive practices to deter consumers from switching to other devices.

In May 2024, the DOJ filed an antitrust lawsuit against Ticketmaster parent company Live Nation Entertainment. Upon filing the lawsuit, Kanter stated that "Live music should not be available only to those who can afford to pay the Ticketmaster tax". In August 2024, the DOJ launched an antitrust suit against RealPage, accusing the company of engaging in an unlawful pricing scheme that hiked rental prices.

==== Scrutiny of interlocking directorates ====
During his time in office, Kanter has intensified scrutiny of anti-competitive interlocking directorates, in which an individual serves on the boards of competing companies in the same industry. Legal analysts have noted that section 8 of the Clayton Antitrust Act of 1914 forbids individuals from simultaneously holding director positions in companies in competition with each other, but that this law has largely been unenforced over the past century.

In October 2022, renewed scrutiny of anti-competitive interlocking directorate agreements led to the resignation of seven directors at five companies. As part of the DOJ's scrutiny of private equity firms, it was reported that the department is investigating potential violations by firms including Blackstone and Apollo Global Management.

==== Google recusal effort ====
Following Kanter's inauguration, Google wrote to the DOJ to request Kanter's recusal from the United States v. Google search antitrust case. According to The New York Times, Google's complaint centered on Kanter's past criticism of the company's business practices, which Google considered proof of his lack of impartiality in the case, as well as his past representation of Google competitors. Google's request for recusal was criticized as lacking legal basis by Laurence Tribe, professor emeritus at Harvard Law School, as well as by Senator Elizabeth Warren, who accused Google of trying to "bully law enforcement."

In May 2022, it was reported that Kanter would be temporarily barred from participating in antitrust scrutiny of Google until the DOJ decides if he must ultimately recuse himself. In response, a coalition of 28 advocacy groups wrote in favor of allowing Kanter to continue his participation in the case. According to a June 2022 report in The Daily Beast, the decision of whether to allow Kanter to participate in United States v. Google would fall on Vanita Gupta, associate attorney general.

In January 2023, it was reported that Kanter would be cleared to continue to work on DOJ cases involving Google.

== Political views ==
Throughout his career, Kanter has been a critic of Big Tech. Kanter has questioned the value of the dominant "consumer welfare standard" in antitrust policy, arguing that the purpose of antitrust enforcement "is not to decide what is maximally efficient, but to enforce the law". Kanter has been described as being associated with the anti-monopolistic New Brandeis movement alongside FTC chair Lina Khan and National Economic Council (NEC) advisor Tim Wu. Kanter's approach to antitrust enforcement has been criticized by former Secretary of the Treasury Lawrence Summers.

== See also ==
- Department of Justice appointments by Joe Biden
