= Makan Delrahim =

Iranian-American attorney and lobbyist (born 1969)

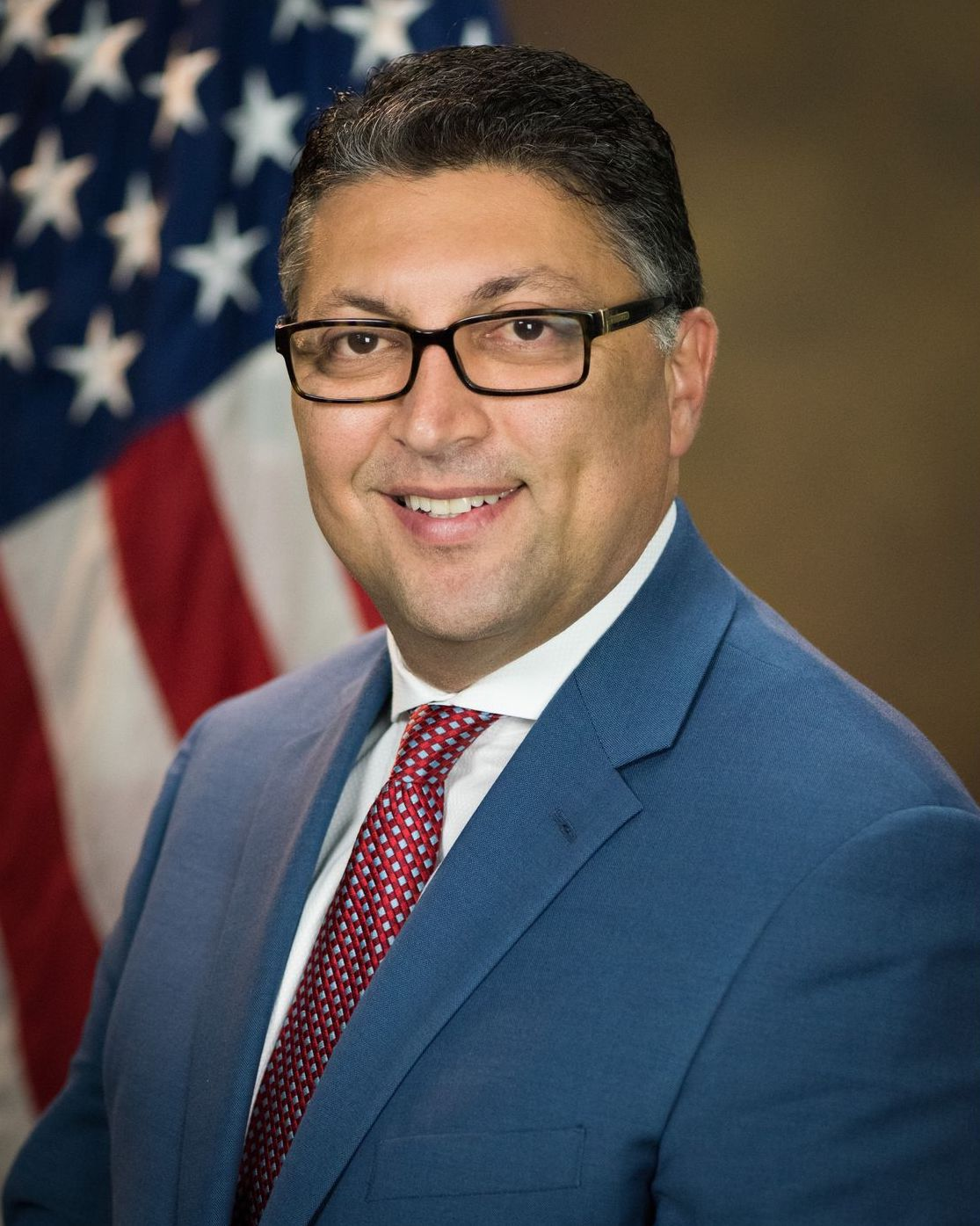

United States Assistant Attorney General for the Antitrust Division
- In office September 28, 2017 – January 20, 2021
- President: Donald Trump
- Preceded by: William Baer
- Succeeded by: Jonathan Kanter

Deputy Assistant to the President Deputy Counsel to the President
- In office January 20, 2017 – September 27, 2017
- President: Donald Trump

Director of Nominations for the White House Office of Legislative Affairs
- In office January 2017 – March 2017
- President: Donald Trump

Personal details
- Born: November 2, 1969 (age 57) Tehran, Iran
- Party: Republican
- Education: University of California, Los Angeles (BS); George Washington University (JD); Johns Hopkins University (MS)

Makan Delrahim (/ˈmeɪkən ˌdɛlrəˈhiːm/; born November 2, 1969) is an Iranian–American lawyer and former lobbyist who was Assistant Attorney General for the Antitrust Division of the U.S. Department of Justice from 2017 to 2021 during the first Donald Trump administration. Since 2025, he has been the chief legal officer of Paramount Skydance. During his tenure at Paramount Skydance, Delrahim has overseen a lobbying campaign to get the second Donald Trump administration to approve the Paramount takeover of Warner Bros. Discovery.

== Early life and education ==
Delrahim was born on November 2, 1969, in Tehran, Iran. His family were Persian Jews who immigrated to the United States in 1979. Like many other Iranian Jewish immigrants, Delrahim's family settled in Los Angeles, California. His father made a living operating a gas station outside of greater Los Angeles, which Delrahim once worked at part-time.

Delrahim initially struggled in elementary school because he did not speak English. Delrahim graduated from the University of California, Los Angeles in 1991 with a Bachelor of Science (B.S.) in kinesiology, as well as a Specialization in Business/Economics.

Rather than pursue a career in kinesiology, Delrahim decided to become a lawyer, applying and gaining admission to the George Washington University Law School. Delrahim became a naturalized U.S. citizen while in law school, and graduated in 1995 with a Juris Doctor (J.D.) degree. Delrahim later earned a Master of Science (M.S.) in biotechnology from Johns Hopkins University in 2002.

== Legal career ==
=== Early career ===
While in law school, Delrahim worked at the Office of Technology Transfer at the National Institutes of Health (NIH), and on intellectual property (IP) issues at the Office of the United States Trade Representative. After law school, Delrahim joined Washington, D.C. law firm Patton Boggs.

In 1998, Delrahim became a counsel to the United States Senate Committee on the Judiciary, where he worked under chairman Orrin Hatch. Delrahim has been described as a protégé of Hatch. During his period, Delrahim worked on intellectual property and antitrust issues, including patent reform and the then-ongoing investigation into Microsoft.

Delrahim later became the Chief of Staff and Chief Counsel of the Senate Judiciary Committee, serving in this capacity until his appointment to the Department of Justice (DOJ) in 2003. Jon Leibowitz, who would later serve under President Barack Obama as chair of the Federal Trade Commission (FTC), worked with Delrahim during this period as a Democratic aide on the Senate Judiciary Committee. Leibowitz later spoke favorably about Delrahim, stating that Delrahim displayed both creativity and pragmatism in this position.

=== Initial tenure at the DOJ Antitrust Division ===
From 2003 through 2005, Delrahim served under President George W. Bush as Deputy Assistant Attorney General for the DOJ Antitrust Division. During his initial tenure at the Antitrust Division, Delrahim was tasked with overseeing the Division's International, Appellate and Policy sections, and also served as the Chairman of the Merger Working Group of the International Competition Network.

Delrahim later served as a commissioner on the bipartisan blue ribbon Antitrust Modernization Commission. At the Antitrust Modernization Commission, Delrahim served along with former Chiefs of the Antitrust Division, Sanford Litvack and John Shenefield, as well as ABA Antitrust Section Chair Jon Jacobson.

=== Post-Bush administration ===
After leaving the Department of Justice, Delrahim joined the law firm of Brownstein Hyatt Farber Schreck, in Los Angeles. He lobbied on behalf of clients such as Comcast, Google, Blue Cross Blue Shield Association, Johnson & Johnson, and Ultimate Fighting Championship.

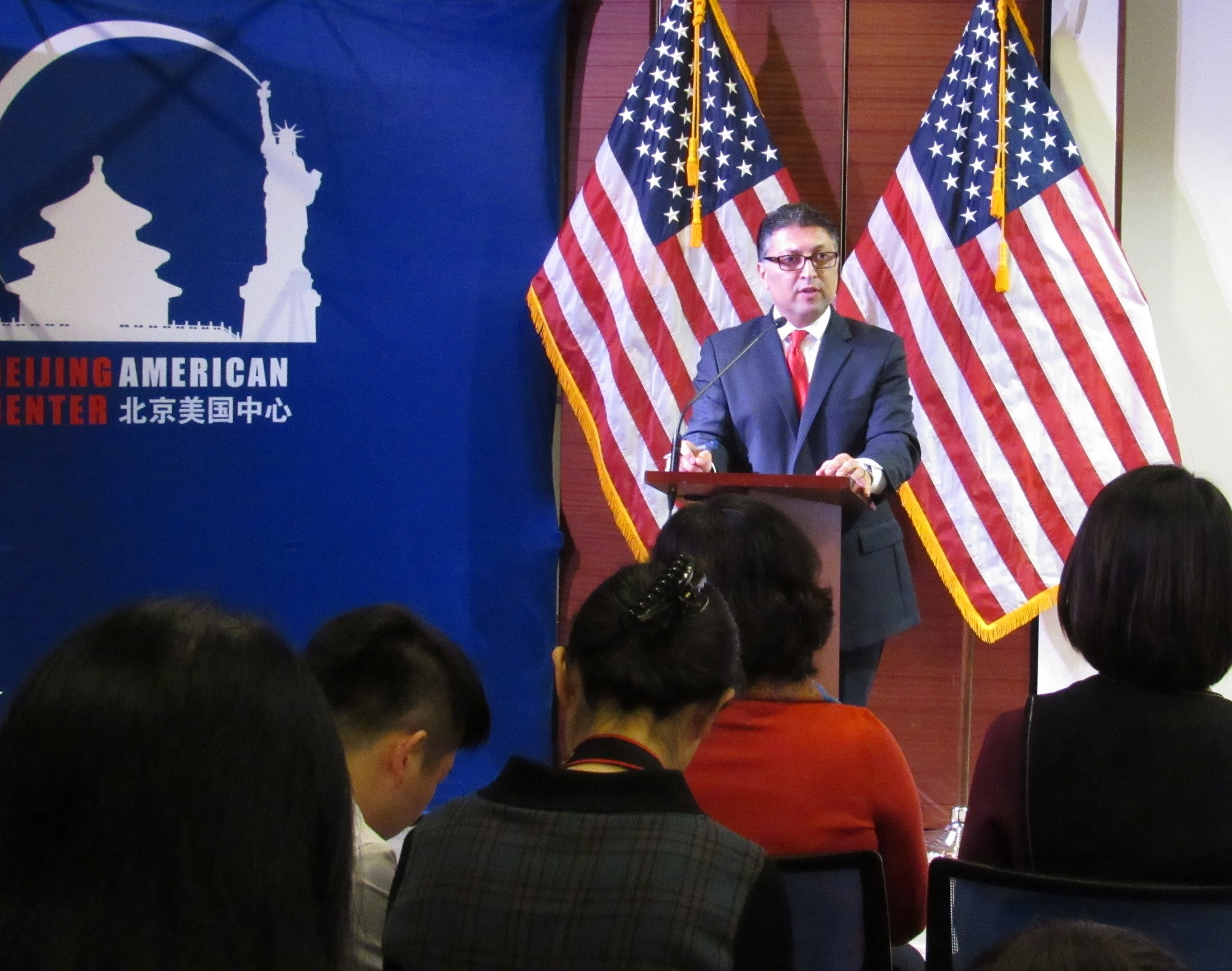
Delrahim in 2014

In October 2016, Delrahim commented on AT&T's proposed $85.4 billion acquisition of Time Warner while appearing on Canada's Business News Network, saying "I don't see this as a major antitrust problem."

== Assistant Attorney General for Antitrust Division ==
=== Nomination ===
In March 2017, Trump announced his nomination of Delrahim as Assistant Attorney General for the United States Department of Justice Antitrust Division. This role, which required U.S. Senate confirmation, entails overseeing criminal cartel enforcement as well as corporate mergers and acquisitions. In September 2017, he was approved 73–21 by the U.S. Senate. When he arrived on the job, he was reportedly gifted a hat with "Makan Antitrust Great Again" (a play on Delrahim's first name and "Make America Great Again") written on it by DOJ staff.

=== Tenure and positions on antitrust ===
When interviewed, Delrahim emphasized that under U.S. law, a monopoly is legal as long as it does not abuse its monopoly power. Delrahim has given speeches arguing that behavioral remedies in consent decrees to remedy an otherwise illegal merger are ineffective and that antitrust enforcers should instead employ structural remedies such as divestment. During his tenure, Delrahim took some anti-monopoly stances on certain antitrust issues while taking less aggressive stances on others, with The Wall Street Journal stating that he "sometimes bucked expectations." Delrahim was reportedly considered for the position of Attorney General after the resignation of Jeff Sessions, though he was ultimately not chosen for the role.

On November 20, 2017, Delrahim filed a lawsuit under Section 7 of the Clayton Antitrust Act of 1914 to block AT&T's $85.4 billion acquisition of Time Warner. On June 12, 2018, U.S. District Judge Richard J. Leon rejected the government's claims and refused to block the merger. The Department of Justice has since appealed this outcome. On May 29, 2018, Delrahim approved Bayer's $66 billion acquisition of Monsanto. Delrahim recused himself from Department of Justice antitrust scrutiny of Google owing to his past consulting work for the company.

In September 2018, Delrahim fired a DOJ paralegal after she participated in a protest against Secretary of Homeland Security Kirstjen Nielsen. An internal DOJ investigation found no evidence of wrongdoing on behalf of the paralegal, but Delrahim dismissed the conclusion of the investigation and fired her. In 2020, Delrahim undertook a reorganization of the DOJ's antitrust division.

=== Post-government tenure ===
In 2021, Delrahim signed onto a letter alongside eight other former Assistant Attorneys General for the Antitrust Division in support of Jonathan Kanter, Joe Biden's nominee for the position. Following his departure from the U.S. Department of Justice in January 2021, Makan Delrahim returned to private practice, joining Latham & Watkins as a partner in its Antitrust & Competition Practice in April 2022. At Latham, he advised clients on complex mergers and acquisitions, government investigations, regulatory compliance, and antitrust litigation.

He was also involved in advising Skydance Media during its negotiations and eventual acquisition of Paramount. In September 2025, Paramount Skydance announced that Delrahim would become its Chief Legal Officer, effective 6 October 2025, with responsibility for the company's legal, regulatory, compliance, and public-policy affairs.

== Political activity ==
In March 2016, Delrahim published an op-ed in the New York Post arguing that due to the importance of future U.S. Supreme Court nominations, Republicans should support Donald Trump over Hillary Clinton.

After Trump's victory in the 2016 U.S. presidential election, Delrahim was active in Trump's presidential transition. After the inauguration of Donald Trump, Delrahim became Deputy White House Counsel and assisted in shepherding United States Supreme Court nominee Neil Gorsuch through the United States Senate confirmation process.

Legal offices
Preceded by William Baer	United States Assistant Attorney General for the Antitrust Division; 2017–2021	Succeeded by Jonathan Kanter
