= Michael Rapino =

Canadian-American business executive

- Born: Michael J. Rapino; May 1, 1967 (age 59); Thunder Bay, Ontario, Canada
- Education: Lakehead University (BBA)
- Occupation: CEO of Live Nation Entertainment
- Spouse: Jolene Blalock (m. 2003)
- Children: 3

Michael J. Rapino is a Canadian-American businessman and the CEO and president of Live Nation Entertainment, Inc, parent company of events/concert promoter Live Nation and ticket sales operation Ticketmaster.

In the late 1990s, Rapino co-founded Core Audience Entertainment, a concert promoting company, and later held several roles at Clear Channel Entertainment. In 2005 he spun out the concert company from Clear Channel and created Live Nation Entertainment that listed as a public company in Dec 2005.

By 2026, his management of Live Nation Entertainment was found too controversial due to monopolies over live event ticket sales, threats to some arena management, and overcharge of ticket prices, with Rapino confirmed to have personally threatened at least one arena head over the use of Ticketmaster.

== Early life and education ==
Michael Rapino was born in Thunder Bay, Ontario, to a Catholic-Italian family and earned a bachelor of business administration degree from Lakehead University in 1989. While attending Lakehead, Rapino promoted bands at local bars and signed his first artist, Jeff Healey.

== Career ==
While at Lakehead, Rapino landed a job as a beer rep for Labatt Breweries and started promoting bands at local bars, arranging a weekly ad in The Argus called "The Blue Zone" that featured live music events happening in Thunder Bay that upcoming weekend. After graduation, he moved to Toronto and continued his career as a sales representative for Labatt. He remained at the company for ten years in different marketing and entertainment roles. In the late 1990s Rapino founded Core Audience Entertainment, a concert promotion company that operated in Canada. Core Audience Entertainment was acquired by SFX Entertainment in 1999, which was in turn acquired by Clear Channel Communications in 2000. Rapino held several roles at Clear Channel Entertainment. He was later named CEO of Live Nation when it was spun off from Clear Channel in 2005.

=== Live Nation ===
As the CEO of Live Nation, Rapino initially focused on expanding the business outside of tour management, including artists' recording and marketing. Between 2007 and 2010, Rapino announced deals with artists such as Madonna, U2, and Jay-Z. In 2016, Rapino announced a deal between Lady Gaga and Live Nation's management division.

In 2010, Live Nation merged with Ticketmaster, a live entertainment ticket seller. Rapino was named CEO of the new parent company, Live Nation Entertainment. Prior to the merger's approval by the U.S. Justice Department, Rapino and then-Ticketmaster CEO Irving Azoff testified in front of a Senate antitrust panel. They argued that the merger was necessary to reduce inefficiencies and help the music industry, which was struggling financially at the time.

Rapino has led the company in acquiring several festivals and companies, including House of Blues Entertainment in 2006, Bonnaroo Festival in 2015, and Blue Note Entertainment in 2017. Rapino earned $70.6 million in 2017 and was reported to have one of the highest discrepancies in salary between CEO and his employees who earned an average of $24,000. Also in 2017, he extended his contract with Live Nation through 2022. Rapino was appointed to the SiriusXM Radio board of directors in January 2018. Also in 2018, he was listed as #1 on the Billboard Power 100 list of influential people in the music industry.

Rapino, in response to complaints about ticket prices, and a call for greater regulation and control and ticket prices from the Cure frontman Robert Smith, Rapino argued that ticket prices should be like "as they're buying a Gucci bag", that the average consumer could afford to buy such a luxury, Rapino stating, "This is a business where we can charge a bit more." Rapino continued, "I'm not saying excessively, but it's a great two-hour performance of a lifetime, that happens once every three, four years in that market. You don't have to underprice yourself—low to middle income [people] will make their way to that arena for that special night."

In 2022, Rapino's total compensation from Live Nation was $139 million, making him the fifth highest paid CEO in the US that year. In 2023, Rapino's total compensation was $23.4 million, or 831 times the median employee pay at Live Nation for that year.

==== Live event monopoly and overcharge controversy ====
On April 15, 2026, a New York-based federal jury found in the case of United States v. Live Nation Entertainment that Live Nation Entertainment under Rapino's leadership held, in violation numerous state anti-trust laws, an illegal monopoly over live events which enabled the company and its subsidiaries, including Ticketmaster, to overcharge consumer ticket prices. The verdict was made through a lawsuit which had originally been filed by the U.S. Department of Justice and numerous states in May 2024 with the Department withdrawing after settlement with Live Nation Entertainment. It remains for the judge to determine the remedy, which the states have asked to include monetary damages and structural relief, which proceedings apparently won't occur until Spring 2027.

Rapino had testified during the case where he denied that Live Nation Entertainment had issued threats, but was instead competing aggressively. Despite this claim, at least one recorded phone conversation which was revealed during the trial confirmed that Rapino had personally threatened at least one arena head, in this case the former head of the Barclays Center in Brooklyn, not to drop Ticketmaster when the arena was considered severing ties to Ticketmaster in favor of rival company SeatGeek, with Rapino stating in the conversation that the Barclays Arena would be risk having tours at the arena cancelled if Ticketmaster was dropped.

Before the verdict in the ant-trust case, the Department of Justice and Live Nation Entertainment reached a tentative settlement and the Department withdrew from the case. The settlement required Live Nation to create a $280m settlement fund for participating states, divest from 13 of its exclusive booking agreements with amphitheaters, limit fees at 15% of face value, and open parts of its platform to other companies; however, the settlement allowed Live Nation to retain ownership of Ticketmaster. The judge in the anti-trust case will conduct a Tunney Act fairness review for approval of this settlement with the Justice Department.

=== Film producer ===
Rapino began producing films in 2015. In 2018, he was an executive producer on the HBO documentary Believer and on the romantic drama A Star is Born.

== Personal life ==
Rapino met his wife, American model and actress Jolene Blalock, when he cast her in a commercial he was shooting. Rapino and Blalock married in Negril, Jamaica, on April 22, 2003, and have three sons. Rapino and Blalock founded the Rapino Foundation, an organization that assists populations in the developing world.

== Honours ==
In 2015, Rapino was given an honorary doctorate of commerce from Lakehead University. He also received the Clara Lionel Foundation Diamond Honors Award for his commitment to philanthropy.
