= United States v. Live Nation Entertainment =

Ongoing American antitrust lawsuit

- Court: United States District Court for the Southern District of New York
- Full case name: United States of America, State of Arizona, State of Arkansas, State of California, State of Colorado, State of Connecticut, District of Columbia, State of Florida, State of Illinois, State of Maryland, Commonwealth of Massachusetts, State of Michigan, State of Minnesota, State of Nevada, State of New Hampshire, State of New Jersey, State of New York, State of North Carolina, State of Ohio, State of Oklahoma, State of Oregon, Commonwealth of Pennsylvania, State of Rhode Island, State of South Carolina, State of Tennessee, State of Texas, Commonwealth of Virginia, State of Washington, State of West Virginia, State of Wisconsin and State of Wyoming v. Live Nation Entertainment, Inc. and Ticketmaster Entertainment, LLC

United States, et al. v. Live Nation Entertainment, Inc. and Ticketmaster Entertainment, LLC is an antitrust lawsuit brought by the U.S. Department of Justice (DOJ), forty U.S. states, and Washington, D.C., against entertainment company Live Nation Entertainment and its subsidiary Ticketmaster, following the Taylor Swift–Ticketmaster controversy in 2022.

Filed on May 23, 2024, the lawsuit alleges that Live Nation has a monopoly on the live event sector. The case was filed before the United States District Court for the Southern District of New York. If successful, Live Nation Entertainment may be forced to sell Ticketmaster. The Live Nation trial began on March 2, 2026. A settlement had been reached a week later. However, this did not prevent the 2024 lawsuit from continuing trial proceedings. In April 2026, a federal jury in New York found that Live Nation Entertainment held a monopoly and violated federal and state anti-trust laws.

== Background ==
Politico reported that the lawsuit followed "years of backlash from consumers, rivals, and lawmakers against Ticketmaster and its parent company."

=== Initial merger (2010) ===
In 2009, Live Nation and Ticketmaster announced plans to merge to become the present-day company Live Nation Entertainment. At the time, Ticketmaster had been dominant in ticket sales for over twenty years. Documents obtained by the DOJ found that Live Nation's entry into the ticketing market in December 2008 posed a threat to Ticketmaster's market share, and the merger effort was announced two months later.

The merger announcement received criticism from artists including Bruce Springsteen and several consumer groups. The DOJ ultimately permitted the merger to proceed, with both parties being required to sign a 10-year consent decree. The agreement was intended to prevent the company from engaging in anti-competitive behavior, including retaliation against independent venues.

=== Scrutiny since 2010 ===
Following the merger, Live Nation's Ticketmaster faced allegations that it engaged in anti-competitive behavior that violated the 2010 consent decree. In 2019, the DOJ probed the company over allegations that Live Nation leveraged its dominance in concert touring to coerce venues into signing contracts with Ticketmaster. In December 2019, the DOJ announced that Live Nation Entertainment agreed to amend and strengthen the consent decree.

Following the Taylor Swift–Ticketmaster controversy in 2022, congressional lawmakers urged antitrust action against Ticketmaster. In November 2022, it was reported that the DOJ was conducting an antitrust probe into Ticketmaster's compliance with the 2019 agreement. Politico reported in July 2023 that the DOJ's probe into Ticketmaster had progressed, and that a formal antitrust lawsuit against Live Nation was possible.

== Lawsuit developments ==
Twenty-nine state attorneys general and the attorney general for the District of Columbia (blue) joined the DOJ in filing the lawsuit on May 23, 2024.

On May 23, 2024, the Department of Justice formally announced its antitrust lawsuit against Live Nation Entertainment, accusing the company of illegally monopolizing the live event market. During a news conference, Attorney General Merrick Garland stated "It is time to break it up" in reference to the company. The DOJ's legal team includes over a dozen attorneys under the leadership of Jonathan Kanter, the Assistant Attorney General for the Antitrust Division.

The DOJ was joined in filing the lawsuit by twenty-eight state attorneys general, as well as the attorney general for the District of Columbia. (Note: The twenty-eight states are as follows: Arkansas, California, Colorado, Connecticut, Florida, Illinois, Maryland, Massachusetts, Michigan, Minnesota, Nevada, New Hampshire, New Jersey, New York, North Carolina, Ohio, Oklahoma, Oregon, Pennsylvania, Rhode Island, South Carolina, Tennessee, Texas, Virginia, Washington, West Virginia, Wisconsin, and Wyoming) The DOJ and states are pursuing a jury trial in the case. On August 19, 2024, ten additional state attorneys-general joined the lawsuit, bringing the total number of co-plaintiffs to 40. (Note: The ten states that filed on August 19, 2024 are as follows: Indiana, Iowa, Kansas, Louisiana, Mississippi, Nebraska, New Mexico, South Dakota, Utah and Vermont)

On March 14, 2025, Judge Arun Subramanian rejected a motion from Live Nation to dismiss the case.

The evidence against the defendant includes emails in which Ticketmaster employees admit they “turn a blind eye as a matter of policy” to ticket broker misbehavior and that a broker previously flagged for large-scale rule violations was "not slowing down".

On Thursday, March 5, 2026, the Department of Justice and Live Nation Entertainment reached a tentative settlement requiring Live Nation to create a $280m settlement fund for participating states. It also requires Live Nation to divest from 13 of its exclusive booking agreements with amphitheaters and limit fees at 15% of face value. Additionally, Live Nation has to open parts of its platform to other companies; however, the settlement allowed Live Nation to retain ownership of Ticketmaster.

The settlement was announced on March 9, 2026, after Judge Arun Subramanian was told on the prior evening. Subramanian called it "entirely unacceptable" that he wasn't informed until then, when they had reached a tentative settlement on March 5.

On March 16, 2026, the trial resumed in New York with 36 states and D.C., one week after the DOJ settled and withdrew from the case.

On April 15, 2026, the jury found Live Nation liable on the states' antitrust claims, concluding that the company had illegally monopolized the live events industry and overcharged consumers. Judge Arun Subramanian will determine the remedy, which the states have asked to include monetary damages and structural relief. The original DOJ complaint sought a forced divestiture of Live Nation and Ticketmaster. The judge will also conduct a Tunney Act fairness review for approval of Live Nation's March settlement with the Justice Department.

== Public opinion ==
A poll conducted by Global Strategy Group in 2023 found that 60% of Americans would support efforts to break up Live Nation's Ticketmaster. The proposal was supported by 72% of Democrats, 50% of Republicans, and 46% of independents.

== Related cases ==
Commentators have noted that the lawsuit follows a number of high-profile antitrust lawsuits launched under the Biden administration, including against Apple, Amazon, and Google. Additionally, on May 24, 2024, a day after the DOJ case was filed, a consumer case seeking $5 billion in damages from Live Nation Entertainment on potentially millions of individuals who purchased tickets through Ticketmaster was filed.
