= Gail Slater =

Irish-American lawyer and political advisor

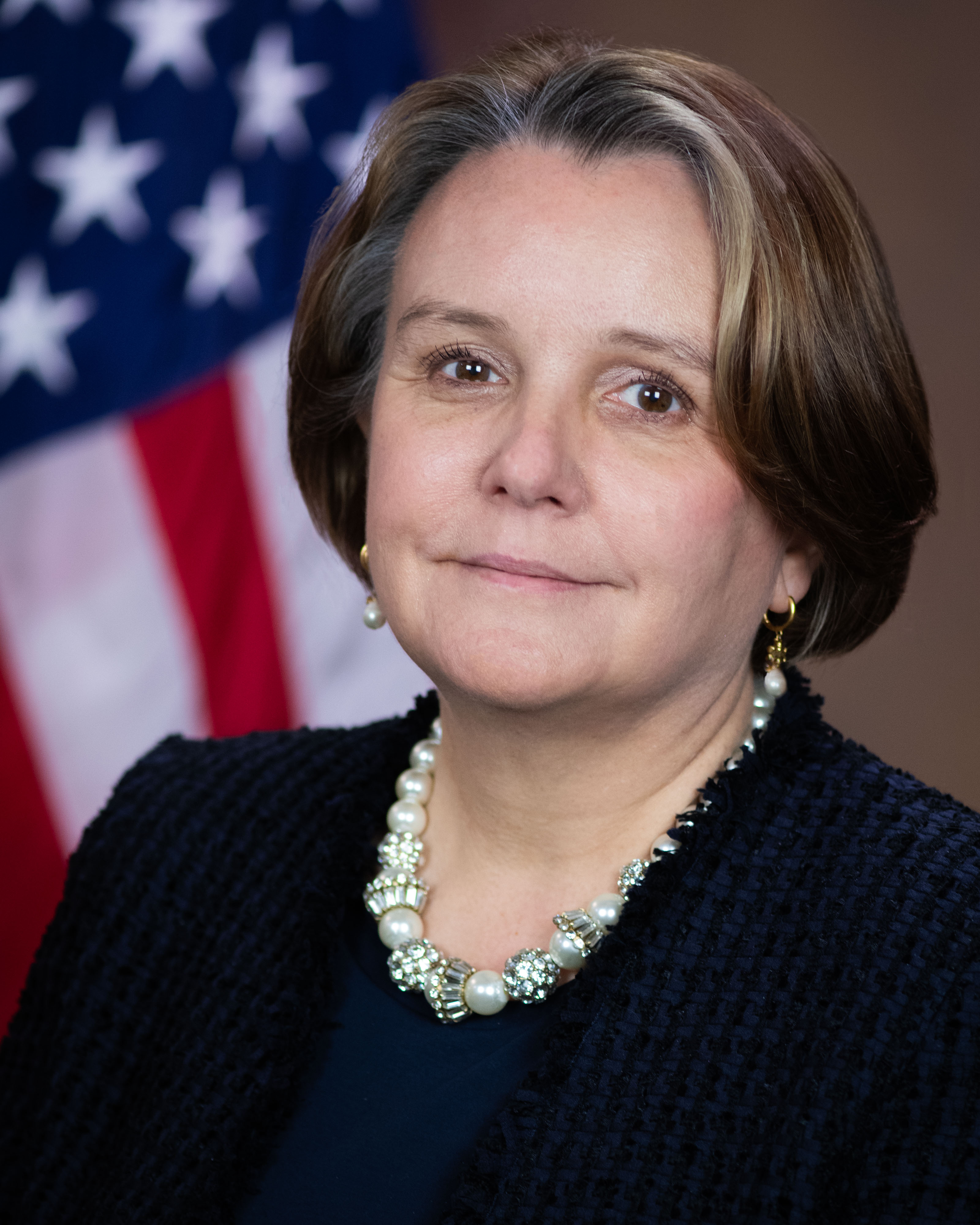
- Official portrait, 2025

United States Assistant Attorney General for the Antitrust Division
- In office March 12, 2025 – February 12, 2026
- President: Donald Trump
- Preceded by: Jonathan Kanter
- Succeeded by: Omeed Assefi (acting)

Personal details
- Born: Abigail Conlon; December 10, 1971 (age 54) Dublin, Ireland
- Party: Republican
- Education: University College Dublin (BCL, LLM); St Hilda's College, Oxford (MJur); College of Law, Guildford (LPC)

Abigail Slater (née Conlon; born December 10, 1971) is an Irish-born American lawyer and political advisor who served as the assistant attorney general for the U.S. Department of Justice's Antitrust Division from March 2025 to February 2026.

== Early life ==
Slater is from Dalkey, Dublin, in Ireland. She earned law a Bachelor of Civil Law in 1993 (with a year abroad at the University of Würzburg) and a Master of Laws in 1996 from University College Dublin, a Master of Jurisprudence from St Hilda's College, Oxford in 1995, and her Legal Practice Course from the College of Law, Guildford in 1997. She moved to the U.S. in 2003 and holds dual citizenship.

== Career ==
Slater started her career with the British law firm Freshfields (now Freshfields Bruckhaus Deringer). She focused on antitrust cases and was often sent to the U.S. as a liaison. She met her future husband, Lindsay Slater, on one of her trips to the U.S. and later moved there, leaving her job at Freshfields to become a staff attorney for the U.S. Federal Trade Commission (FTC) in 2004. At the FTC, she worked on several cases to block major mergers, including one in which Whole Foods Market was attempting to acquire Wild Oats Markets, as well as a case involving the pharmaceutical company Cephalon. In 2011, she became the FTC attorney advisor to commissioner Julie Brill.

Slater left the FTC in 2014, to become the vice-president for legal and regulatory policy for the Internet Association, a lobbying group, later becoming general counsel. After four years there, she was appointed in February 2018 to the administration of President Donald Trump as special assistant to the president for technology, telecommunications and cybersecurity. After a year in the Trump administration, Slater left to become the senior vice president for policy and strategy at Fox Corporation. She later became a vice president and deputy general counsel for Roku, Inc.

In 2024, Slater became a policy advisor for vice presidential candidate and later Vice President-elect JD Vance. When Donald Trump won the 2024 presidential election, Slater became an advisor for his transition team on antitrust policy. On December 4, 2024, Trump nominated her to serve as Assistant Attorney General for the Department of Justice Antitrust Division. On March 11, 2025, she was confirmed by the Senate, 78-19. She announced her immediate resignation on February 12, 2026.

Legal offices
Preceded by Jonathan Kanter	United States Assistant Attorney General for the Antitrust Division; 2025–2026	Succeeded by Omeed Assefi (acting)
