= Stage Dive =

Stage dive
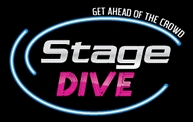
- Type: Private
- Industry: e-commerce
- Founded: 2007
- Headquarters: London United Kingdom
- Products: Online secondary ticketing
- Website: www.stagediveonline.com

Stage Dive is a British online secondary ticket broker trading in the UK market and supplying tickets for concert, theatre and sports events.

== Service ==
Founded in 2007, Stage Dive Online Limited is one of several secondary ticket brokers who launched in the wake of Ticketmaster’s loosening dominance of the secondary ticket industry, including Viagogo and Seatwave, and operates mostly through its website, from which tickets can be found, selected and bought.

== Favoured venues ==
Stage Dive supplies tickets to venues across the UK but favours arena venues such as:

- The O2 arena, London
- Wembley Stadium, London
- Wembley Arena, London
- Royal Albert Hall, London
- Hammersmith Apollo, London
- Brixton Academy, London
- Hyde Park, London
- Manchester Evening News Arena, Manchester
- National Indoor Arena, Birmingham
- Birmingham NEC, Birmingham
- SECC, Glasgow
