= TickPick =

Online marketplace

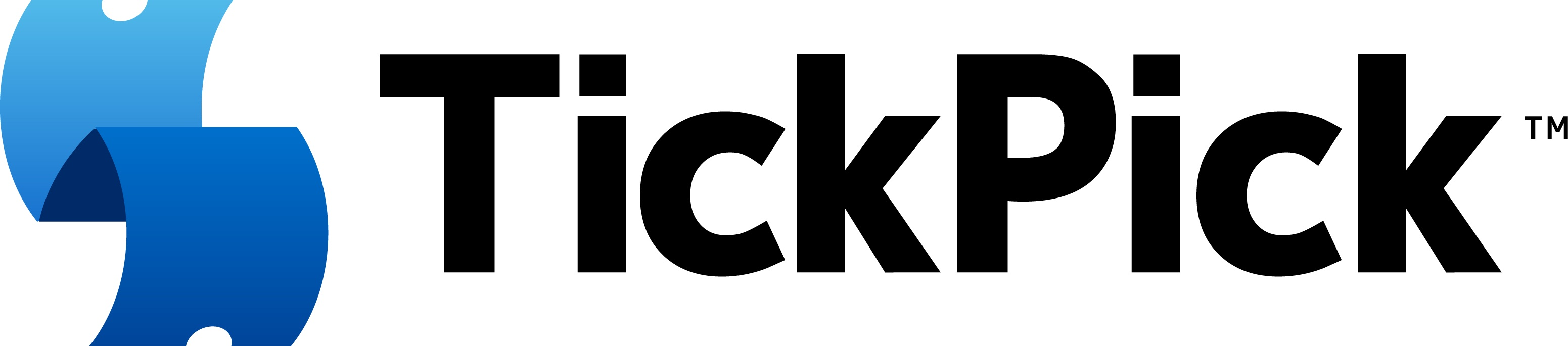
- Company type: Private
- Available in: English
- Founded: New York City, New York, USA
- Headquarters: New York City, New York, United States
- Area served: Worldwide
- Key people: Brett Goldberg (founder co-CEO); Chris O'Brien (founder, co-CEO)
- Industry: Ticket exchange Ticket resale
- Products: Tickets for sports, concerts, theater, entertainment events
- Revenue: $200 M (2019)
- Employees: 50 (2019)
- Launched: 2011; 15 years ago
- Current status: Active

TickPick (founded in 2011) is an online marketplace for events tickets based in New York, New York that allows users to bid on tickets.

== History ==
TickPick was founded in 2011 by Brett Goldberg and Chris O'Brien. They developed a patented best deal ranking system, which assigned each ticket a rating based on proximity and viewing angle with A+ through D grades (website allows users to adjust this ranking based on a user's personal preferences). Another innovation was a bid platform, which allowed consumers to bargain with multiple sellers by placing offers on a multitude of seats. TickPick differentiated itself from StubHub with lower fees.

In May 2012, TickPick raised $250,000 in seed funding and in 2014 launched their mobile app. In 2017, the website enraged Facebook users by insulting Upper Peninsula, Michigan, residents by calling this location (that was missing on TickPick's map) "just a bunch of forests". To address the issue, Brett Goldberg, co-founder of TickPick, issued a formal apology online and visited Marquette to apologize in person. In April 2018, it became the official ticket marketplace for Delaware's Firefly Music Festival, replacing StubHub. On May 1, 2018, TickPick acquired RazorGator, one of its main competitors, for an undisclosed amount. On July 24, 2018, TickPick acquired advanced ticket inventory aggregator Rukkus.com, one of its competitors, for an undisclosed amount. On August 1, 2018, TickPick announced an endorsement deal with WWE Legend and 2-time WWE Hall of Fame recipient, Ric Flair.

In September 2018, TickPick entered into partnership with Van Wagner Sports & Entertainment to become the Official Marketplace for the athletics programs at East Tennessee State University, Florida International University, Georgia State University, Longwood University, Niagara University, Rider University, Samford University, Santa Clara University, Siena College, Saint Joseph's University, Stony Brook University, Towson University, Valparaiso University, as well as the America East Conference, Big South Conference, Colonial Athletic Association, Western Athletic Conference, and the Jamaica Classic Basketball Tournament.

On January 24, 2019, TickPick announced a partnership deal with Rooftop2 Productions, a subsidiary company of Lagardère Sports and Entertainment to produce the Maxim (magazine) Pregame Experience at Super Bowl LIII.

On June 4, 2019, TickPick announced partnerships with Riot Fest and WE Fest, becoming the Official Secondary Ticket Marketplace for both music festivals.

On August 6, 2019, TickPick announced a $40 million investment from its first institutional investor, PWP Growth Equity.

== Recognition ==
Year	Type of recognition	Recognition	Awarding body	Rank
2013	award	Industry Innovation Award	Ticket Summit	
2016	award	Technology Fast 500 Ranking	Deloitte	32
2017	rating	Technology Fast 500 Ranking	Deloitte	134
2018	rating	Technology Fast 500 Ranking	Deloitte	153
2016	rating	Inc. 5000 Fastest Growing Private Companies	Inc.	90
2017	rating	Inc. 5000 Fastest Growing Private Companies	Inc.	525
2018	rating	Inc. 5000 Fastest Growing Private Companies	Inc.	733
2016	rating	50 fastest-growing companies in New York	Crain's New York	10
2017	rating	50 fastest-growing companies in New York	Crain's New York	24
2018	rating	50 fastest-growing companies in New York	Crain's New York	33

== Competitors ==
According to a 2017 report by TechNavio, TickPick was one of the key players on the global secondary tickets market competing with RazorGator, StubHub and Ticketmaster Entertainment. SeatGeek, TicketIQ and Vivid Seats were also among its competitors.
