= Online ticket brokering =

Online ticket brokering is the resale of tickets through a web-based ticket brokering service or online ticket exchanges. Prices on ticket brokering websites are determined by demand, availability, and the ticket reseller. Tickets sold through an online ticket brokering service may or may not be authorized by the official seller.

Generally, the majority of trading on ticket brokering websites concerns itself with tickets to live entertainment events whereby the primary officially licensed seller's supply has been exhausted and the event has been declared "sold-out". This "sold-out" status increases the ticket's potential market value. Critics of the industry compare the resale of tickets online to ‘ticket touting’, ‘scalping’ or a variety of other terms for the unofficial sale of tickets directly outside the venue of an event.

== History ==
The late 1990s and early 2000s saw the emergence of online ticket brokering as a lucrative business. Corporate ticket reselling firm Ticketmaster developed a strong online presence, dominating the online market. But, by 2006 Ticketmaster's stranglehold on the industry loosened with the emergence of other online ticket brokering companies, such as StubHub who won Major League Baseball's ticket resale business over Ticketmaster.

In 2008, securities analyst Joe Bonner, who tracked Ticketmaster's parent company New York-based IAC/InterActiveCorp, told USA Today: "You have to look at the secondary market as something that is a real threat to Ticketmaster. They missed the boat. StubHub has been around a few years now already. They weren't as proactive as they probably should have been."

Eric Baker, founder and CEO of Viagogo.com, a European ticket resale website described the loosening of Ticketmaster's grip on the market as "the equivalent in the ticketing industry of the fall of the Roman Empire".

By 2008 Internet ticket fraud had emerged as global problem, when fake ticket websites defrauded millions of dollars from sports fans by selling Beijing Olympics tickets which they had no intention of delivering.

Due to the success of the secondary sale of tickets on the web, the line between ‘official’ (primary) ticket sellers and online ticket brokers (secondary sellers) became blurred.

Events such as Ticket summit 2008 in the US, held by the Better Ticketing Association, became more and more common. A look at the program for this congress gave a good idea of the key indicators on the agenda of ‘professionalizing’ online ticket brokering. Topics included: ‘Getting Legal’, ‘Media Relations’ and ‘Building Your Base: The Lost Art of Customer Service’. There were similar conferences in the UK, such as the ‘Ticket Touting: Going, Going…Gone?’ conference held in London on 19 March 2008. Live UK Summit is another event that draws together ticketing agencies and other sectors involved in the live entertainment industry together in an open discussion forum.

The increasing legitimization of the internet as a free market environment for entrepreneurs had plenty of online ticket broker communities sprouting up. Many states in the US repealed laws against ticket reselling. Five states made the resale of tickets legal in 2007, with a Missouri senator stating, ‘It makes no sense that we would turn people into criminals for simply wanting to resell a ticket […].’

While the internet became an increasingly safer place to shop, it was still not the place for the overcautious buyer. Online ticket brokering was legal in most countries, such as the UK and other European countries, and it became a profitable business venture. Venue owners and secondary ticket sellers debated this issue at the “Ticket Touting: Going, Going…Gone?” conference held in London on 19 March 2008, concluding that, for the time being, ticket resale was a legal and acceptable practice in the UK. More recent coverage has suggested that, although secondary ticketing remains part of the live events market, consumer concern has shifted towards inflated resale prices, hidden fees, buyer protection and the credibility of verified fan-to-fan marketplaces. In the United Kingdom, reporting around Wimbledon and Oasis has highlighted public frustration with traditional resale platforms and late-stage checkout fees. Other commentary has argued that verified marketplaces may become more prominent if buyers prioritise transparency, seller accountability and stronger protection against ticket fraud.

== See also ==
- Dynamic pricing
- Ticket resale
- Ticket exchange
- Price discrimination
- Internet ticket fraud
- Tout
