= EU Secondary Ticketing Association =

- Formation: 2009
- Legal status: Association
- Purpose: Non-Governmental
- Headquarters: Amsterdam, Netherlands
- Region served: European Union
- Members: private companies
- Official language: EN and NL
- Chairman of the Board, General Secretary and Treasurer: Keje Molenaar, Marlies Hoedemaker
- Website: English Website Dutch Website

EU Secondary Ticketing Association, also known as EUSTA, is a non-governmental, self-regulatory body based in the Netherlands, formed to provide self-regulation within the ticket resale industry in the European Union. EUSTA's aim is to ensure fairness and openness in the sale of event tickets and its members are required to comply with a stringent code of practice.

== Code of practice ==
The EUSTA code of practice covers all aspects of secondary ticket market practices - however it can be summarized in the preamble:

- This code of conduct is laid down by the European Union Secondary Ticketing Association (“EUSTA”). It establishes rules of conduct and requirements for all secondary market parties that are associated with EUSTA.
- It is the aim of EUSTA to safeguard quality for buyers who have purchased (admission) tickets for an event from suppliers of (admission) tickets on the secondary market. In order to be able to offer the buyer transparency and guarantees when buying admission tickets on the secondary market, EUSTA has drawn up a number of rules of conduct and requirements.
- Companies bearing the EUSTA trademark meet these rules of conduct and requirements drawn up by EUSTA. These rules of conduct and requirements also serve to protect the buyer.

== Founders and Participants ==
EUSTA was founded in 2009 by a group of Dutch Online ticket brokering companies engaged in Ticket resale in order to provide benchmarks to help legitimize and change negative public perception of the emerging free market around event ticketing online.

Well-known ex-Dutch Footballer and lawyer Keje Molenaar is the Chairman of EUSTA and the Secretary and treasurer is Marlies Hoedemaker.

Current EUSTA members include:

- Worldticketshop
- PepeTickets
- Rang1Tickets
- Budgetticket BV, Budget Ticket and Online Ticketing Shop
- Tickets4u

== Politics ==
EUSTA has been actively lobbying against a recently proposed Dutch bill to legislate the secondary ticket market in the Netherlands, an initiative of the Members of Parliament Arda Gerkens of the Socialist Party (SP) and Nicolien van Vroonhoven-Cook of the Christian Democratic Appeal (CDA). EUSTA has also protested vigorously against mass ticket cancellations by Mojo Concerts (Live Nation Entertainment) in the Dutch secondary Market.
