= Chris Tsakalakis =

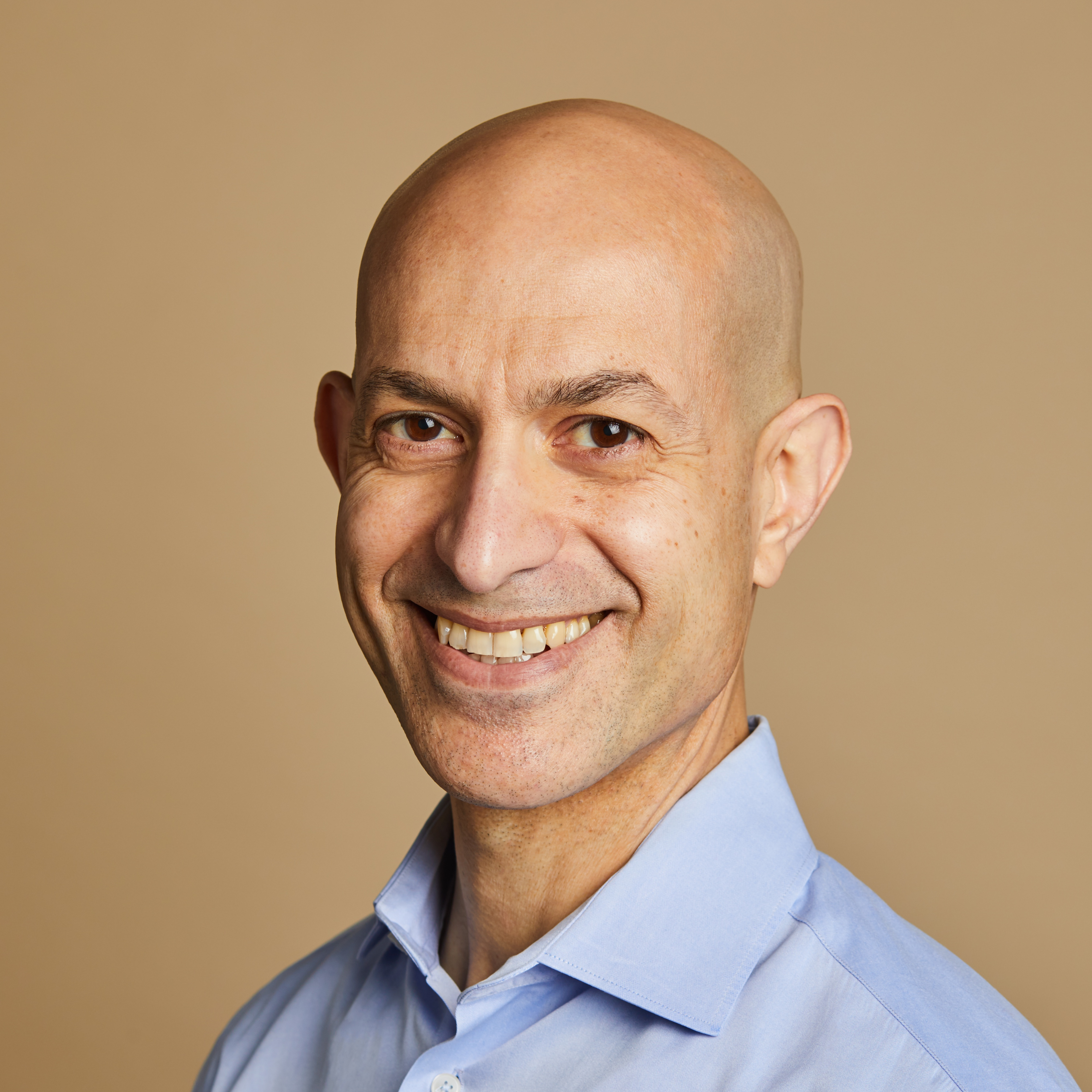
- Born: Chicago
- Citizenship: United States and Greece
- Education: University of Pennsylvania (B.S.)
- Occupation: Business Person
- Title: Managing Partner of Trefo
- Board member of: Aunt Bertha dba findhelp
- Spouse: Katharine Brunt Tsakalakis (married 1999-present)
- Children: 2
- Website: ChrisTsakalakis.com

Chris Tsakalakis is a Greek-American technology executive, advisor and board member. He is currently the managing partner of Trefo, a boutique consulting firm focused on helping technology companies. Previously, Tsakalakis was the CEO of Kiva, an international nonprofit that crowdfunds loans for underserved people in over 70 countries. Tsakalakis previously served as the chief executive officer of Vivino, an Entrepreneur in Residence at Benchmark Capital, the president of StubHub, an executive at eBay and a consultant at Bain & Company. He is a graduate of the University of Pennsylvania.

== Career ==
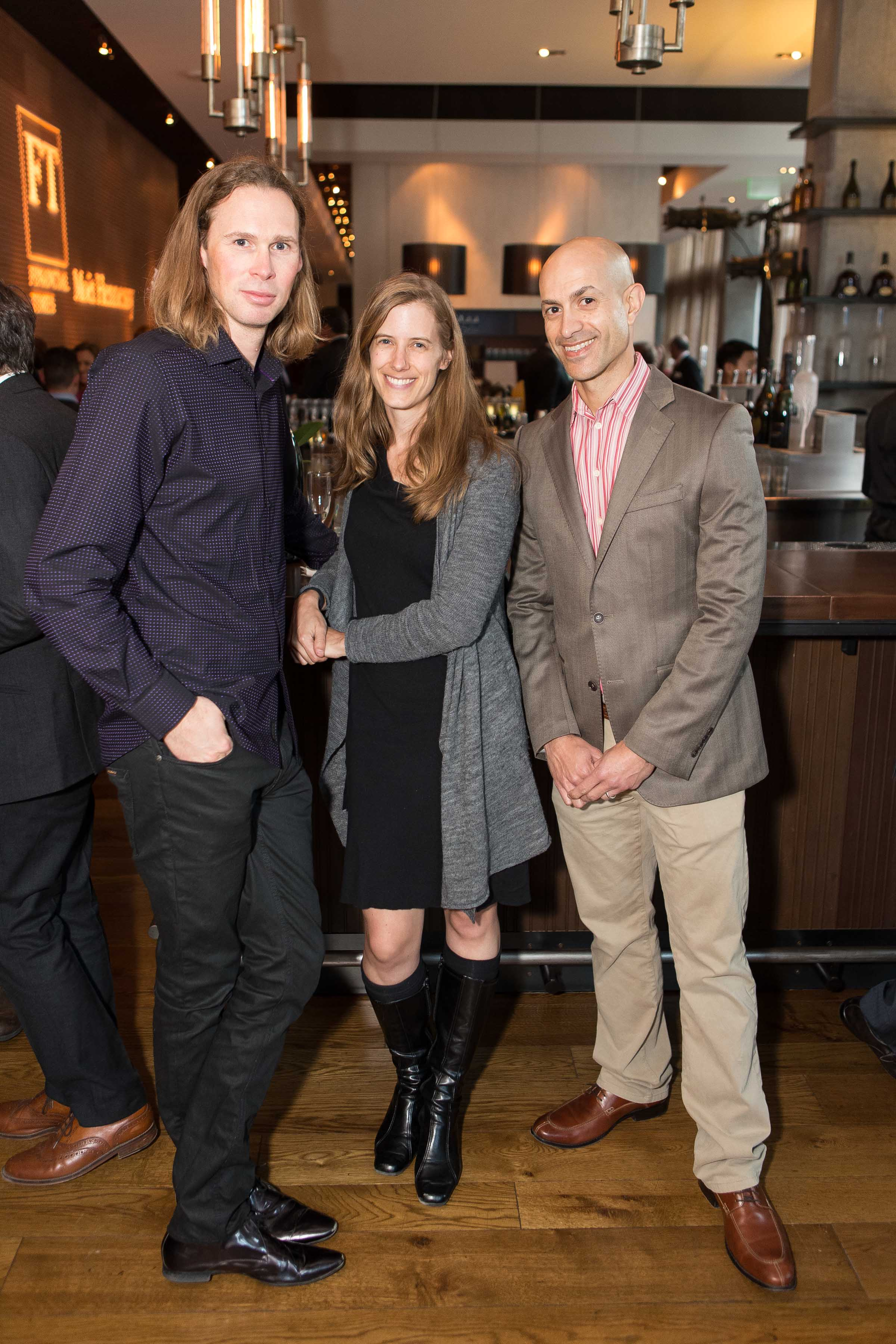
Tsakalakis with Michael Birch and April Dembosky in 2012

=== Early career and eBay ===
Tsakalakis graduated summa cum laude with a Bachelor of Science degree in economics from the Wharton School of the University of Pennsylvania. He worked as a consultant for Bain & Company for six years before beginning a career in e-commerce in 1996. He was a manager of two newly founded e-commerce start-ups before starting consulting firm Trefo, which served high-technology companies. Tsakalakis began working for eBay as an executive in 2003. He was the vice president of the Advanced Solutions Group, which provided services to advanced eBay buyers and sellers and included eBay Stores, ProStores, Trading Platforms, Seller Marketing and Tools, the eBay Developers program and Shipping. During his time at eBay, the eBay Stores subscriber base grew from 50,000 to over 260,000. He was also involved in the establishment of eBay subsidiary ProStores, which provided the ability for small business to set up ecommerce websites.

=== StubHub ===
Tsakalakis was appointed President of StubHub in 2007 and played a key role in its growth and development, helping it grow into the largest ticket marketplace in the world. Soon after his appointment, in an interview with The Economist, Tsakalakis stated that StubHub was enjoying "very stellar growth". Tsakalakis contributed several articles to the Huffington Post blog. On July 12, 2010, Tsakalakis contributed an editorial in which he defended ticket resale. He argued that "those that benefit the most from the ticket resale are the devoted fans". Tsakalakis left StubHub in November 2014, and was replaced by Scott Cutler.

Ticket News cited Tsakalakis as "one of the most influential executives in the ticketing industry." In 2011, 2012 and 2013, he was listed in Sports Business Journal ’s list of the 50 most influential people in the sports business. Tsakalakis was also on the Billboard Power 100 lists in 2012 and 2013, and the Huffington Post Sports Game Changer lists in 2010 and 2011.

=== Later positions ===
In 2016, Tsakalakis joined Benchmark Capital as an entrepreneur in residence (EIR) "to explore new business opportunities in the areas of e-commerce, marketplaces and health tech.". Tsakalakis left Benchmark after his one-year stint as an EIR concluded in 2017.

In March 2018, Tsakalakis joined Vivino as chief executive officer, taking over the reins from Vivino's founder, Heini Zachariassen. Tsakalakis left Vivino in October 2019.

In April 2021, Tsakalakis joined Kiva as its chief executive officer, picking up the baton from Neville Crawley. He left Kiva in July 2022. Tsakalakis joined the board of directors of the public benefit corporation, Aunt Bertha, doing business as findhelp, in June 2021. He restarted his consulting firm, Trefo, to become a full time advisor and consultant in August 2022.

=== Other roles ===
Tsakalakis is a member of the Young Presidents' Organization and serves on the board of the Western States Region of the American Heart Association.
