= Better Online Tickets Sales Act =

2016 U.S. federal act

The Better Online Ticket Sales Act of 2016 (Pub.L. 114-274, S.3183, commonly referred to as the BOTS Act) was signed into federal law by President Barack Obama on December 14, 2016. This act was created to thwart attempts by individuals and organization to automate the process of purchasing tickets en masse using ticket bots. Later, these tickets are often resold on third-party sites for profit at a markup over face value, or at a loss. This activity is also referred to as ticket scalping. The BOTS Act outlawed the resale of tickets purchased using bot technology and set a fine of $16,000 for violations of the act, which is enforced by the U.S. Federal Trade Commission.

== Purpose of the act ==
The bill was first introduced in the U.S. House of Representatives (114th Congress) in February 2015 by U.S. Representatives Paul D. Tonko (D-N.Y.) and Marsha Blackburn (R-Tenn.). The BOTS Act was created specifically to prohibit the circumvention of purchase control and ticket allocation measures used by Internet ticket sellers to ensure equitable consumer access to tickets for certain events. Ticketmaster recently sued Prestige Entertainment under the claim that Prestige used ticket bots to purchasing nearly 40% of tickets to the Broadway production of Hamilton and nearly half of all tickets to a Floyd Mayweather and Manny Pacquiao boxing match in 2015. The bill was designed to penalize any party who are knowingly trying to circumvent a security measure, access control system, or another control measure of a ticket seller that is used by the ticket issuer to enforce event ticket purchasing limits or to maintain the integrity of online ticket purchasing order rules. If someone is found to have sold tickets violating the above intentions, that person can then be prosecuted.

This legislation empowers the Federal Trade Commission to act if they have reason to believe a violation of the BOTS act has occurred. States also have the right to form class action suits on behalf of multiple ticket holders.

== Ticket bots ==
A ticket bot is a software program that automates the process of searching for and buying tickets to events on ticket vendor platforms, such as Ticketmaster. Using bots, a broker can automate the process of searching for and buying tickets so that it happens in a flash, and conduct hundreds or even thousands of transactions at the same time. As explained by Consumer Reports, “Bots enable resellers to buy tickets in bulk by automatically completing online forms faster than a human can do by hand, submitting multiple entries at lightning speed, and bypassing authentication codes on websites intended to deter such software.”

== Market analysis ==
A 2016 study by the New York Attorney General found that only 46% of tickets are ever made available to the general public while 54% are reserved for insiders and other specially delegated recipients (such as holders of special credit cards, to name one example). This small supply created conditions where tickets resold after initial purchase was valued on average 49% above face value. In some instances, the report found, ticket prices on the secondary market were 1000% or higher above face value. This created a strong incentive for unscrupulous resellers to use bots to quickly buy as many tickets as possible to profit from the strong demand for a comparatively small number of tickets.

== Commercial reaction ==
While the BOTS Act was a legislative act signed into law in the United States, it set into motion a variety of changes to how the online ticket resale market reported its ticket sourcing.

Notable changes include:

- Google requiring secondary ticket resellers using its paid advertising platforms to disclose that they are not primary ticket sellers. StubHub, Viagogo, Seatwave, and others were in compliance with this as of February 2018.

== Congressional Budget Office report ==
According to a report by the Congressional Budget Office conducted specifically about the BOTS Act, the CBO estimated that increased costs related to monitoring and enforcing the new prohibitions established by the law would total less than $500,000 per year.

In addition, the CBO estimated that enacting the BOTS Act would increase federal revenues from civil penalties imposed to enforce the new prohibition; therefore, pay-as-you-go procedures apply. However, CBO estimated that those collections would be insignificant because of the small number of cases that the agency would probably pursue.

== Existing state regulations ==
Prior to the passing of the BOTS Act, several U.S. states already had their own legislation which bans the use of scalping bots for the ticket resale market. They include the following:

- California
- New York
- Oregon
- Pennsylvania
- Tennessee

Regulating botted ticket scalping is not exclusive to the United States, as multiple foreign countries have adopted similar legislation. Ticket scalping is illegal for all or for some types of events in the United Kingdom, Sweden, Australia, Israel, and the Canadian province of Ontario. Recent media coverage has also linked resale restrictions to wider consumer concerns over hidden fees, inflated secondary-market prices, and the rise of verified fan-to-fan marketplaces. In the United Kingdom, coverage of events such as Wimbledon and Oasis has highlighted growing public frustration with traditional resale platforms and late-stage checkout fees. Other commentators have argued that the future of ticket resale may shift towards verified marketplaces that emphasise seller accountability, clearer pricing, and stronger buyer confidence.
