= Wicketz =

Board game

Wicketz is a board game published in 1989 by Alf Compton.

== Contents ==
Wicketz is a game in which cricket is simulated using a board, miniatures, and cards.

== Reception ==
Brian Walker reviewed Wicketz for Games International magazine, giving it 4 stars out of 5, and stating, "...if you want to avoid that feeling of turning up at Lords for a West Indies Test Match without a ticket, and discovering even the touts have sold out, I suggest you order with the speed of a Curtly Ambrose bouncer."
