= Eric Baker =

Eric Baker may refer to:

- Eric Baker (activist) (1920–1976), British activist founder of Amnesty International
- Eric Baker (businessman) (born 1973), American businessman founder of Viagogo
- Eric Baker, a fictional Governor of Pennsylvania and eventual Vice President in the TV series The West Wing
