= Jeff Fluhr =

American business executive

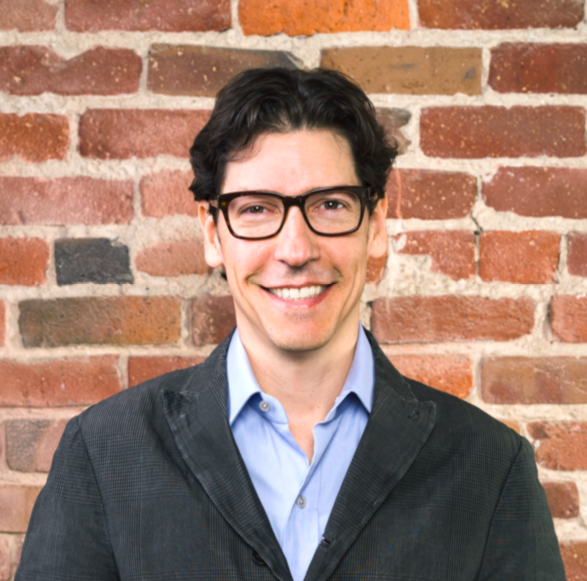
Jeff Fluhr

Jeffrey Fluhr is an American business executive, currently a general partner of Craft. He co-founded StubHub and was its CEO from 2000 until 2007, when it was acquired by eBay. He also established the social video platform Spreecast in 2012, which has since ceased operations. As an angel investor, he has invested in technology companies such as Houzz, Twilio, and Warby Parker.

== Background and early career ==
Fluhr was born into a business-oriented family. His grandfather, Michael Kosof, owned a women's clothing store in Manhattan which he passed on to Fluhr's mother. His father was an engineering executive at AT&T. As a child, Fluhr bought candy in large boxes from a wholesale distributor, and resold it. Fluhr graduated with a dual degree in engineering and finance at the University of Pennsylvania. He won the Joseph Wharton Award for Young Leadership, presented by the Wharton Club of New York. After attending college he worked at the Blackstone Group in New York and then at Thomas Weisel Partners in San Francisco.

== Career ==
While at Stanford Graduate School of Business, Fluhr entered the annual business plan competition with Eric Baker (later of Viagogo). They devised the idea of a website named "NeedATicket.com", where the public could buy and sell tickets for sporting events and concerts. The idea was so promising that in March 2000 they co-founded StubHub and then Fluhr dropped out of Stanford after his first year. They sought out investors in the music and sports industries and, by August 2000, had raised $600,000 of seed capital for the new company.

In 2003, StubHub started running advertisements on Google. By 2006, StubHub had nearly 200 employees, had sold about $200 million worth of tickets, and had sponsorship agreements with 17 professional and college sports teams. Fluhr sold StubHub in 2007 to eBay for $310 million.

In late 2011, Fluhr launched Spreecast, a social video platform which brings people together for face-face conversation. Spreecast integrated with social networks such as Facebook and Twitter. The company closed its website on 14 July 2016.

Fluhr is a general partner of Craft. As an angel investor he has invested in technology companies since the 1990s, including Houzz, Twilio, and Warby Parker.

Fluhr has been the recipient of several awards including the San Francisco Business Times Forty Under 40 list, Sports Business Journal 's Forty Under 40 list and Entrepreneur Magazine 's 24 Best and Brightest Young Entrepreneurs.
