= Spreecast =

Spreecast, Inc.
- Company type: Corporation
- Founded: 2011
- Headquarters: San Francisco, California, {{{location_country}}}
- Area served: Worldwide
- Website: www.spreecast.com
- Registration: Optional
- Current status: Inactive

Spreecast, Inc. was an Internet application and free social video broadcasting platform.

The company was founded in 2011 by Jeff Fluhr, founder and former CEO of online ticketing marketplace StubHub, and was based in San Francisco, California. According to Fluhr, spreecast sought "to bring face-to-face interactions to the Internet in a far-reaching way".

The company tweeted out on June 15, 2016, that their site would be shutting down on July 14.

== History ==
Spreecast was launched as a public beta on November 10, 2011. In December 2011, Spreecast received $4 million in seed venture funding from Frank Biondi, Gordon Crawford, and Edward W. Scott. In September 2012, they raised an additional $7 million. The company added social media author Gary Vaynerchuk as an advisor in February 2012. They closed their website on July 14, 2016.

== Celebrity guests ==
- Reese Witherspoon, American actress and film producer
- Randi Zuckerberg, American internet entrepreneur and former marketing director of Facebook
- One Direction, British-Irish boy band
- Jennifer Grassman, American journalist, pianist, and singer
- Scott Baker, American journalist for TheBlaze
- Britney Spears, American recording artist and entertainer
- Miley Cyrus, American recording artist and entertainer
- Anderson Cooper American journalist
- Neil Patrick Harris, American actor, producer, and director
