= Two Toasters =

Two Toasters LLC
- Company type: Privately owned
- Founded: 2008, Raleigh, North Carolina, United States
- Headquarters: Durham, North Carolina
- Area served: Worldwide
- Key people: Rachit Shukla, Founder/CEO; Adit Shukla, Founder/Director of Creative Services
- Industry: Mobile Technology
- Services: Mobile Application Design and Development
- Employees: 30+
- Website: www.twotoasters.com
- Launched: 2008
- Current status: Closed

Two Toasters is a mobile design and development company based in North Carolina, with offices in New York. They provide iOS and Android application development and strategy.

== History ==
Two Toasters was founded by Rachit and Adit Shukla, along with three friends, in 2008 following the launch of Apple's App Store.

In their first few years, the company worked with other tech startups and with large firms on mobile development and strategy. They developed apps for Airbnb, Dick's Sporting Goods, and GateGuru (now owned by TripAdvisor). More recently, Two Toasters developed apps for Regal Cinemas, Fat Wallet, and JackThreads.

In December 2014, the company moved to its current location in the American Tobacco Historic District after expanding its staff. In January 2015 Gigaom reported that the company is developing an "Ara Manager" Android app for Google.

On March 31, 2015, Two Toasters announced it was acquired by Ticketmaster, and changed its name to Ticketmaster Mobile Studio.

As of October 23, 2019, Ticketmaster Mobile Studio's Twitter, Facebook, GitHub, and LinkedIn pages are deleted, and Google reports their main office at 318 Blackwell St. is permanently closed.

== Awards and honors ==
Two Toasters has won a 2014 Webby award for the Birchbox iOS app and was ranked 787th on the 2014 Inc. 5000 list of companies
