= Stuart Galbraith =

British live music event promoter

Stuart Galbraith is a British live music event promoter. He is the founder of Kilimanjaro Live Group.

== History ==
As of 2007 Galbraith was the UK Managing Director of Live Nation, who were responsible for the creation of Download Festival and Wireless Festival.

== Secondary ticketing legal battle ==
Stuart Galbraith has taken a stance against online secondary ticket sales. In 2017 he accused Google of profiting from secondary market operators acting in breach of the law.

In 2018 Viagogo, a Swiss secondary ticketing platform, filed a lawsuit against Galbraith, alleging that his firm Kilimanjaro Live defrauded customers under the guise of Viagogo. Galbraith spoke out against Viagogo at a parliamentary select committee, denying the accusations.
