= Rukkus.com =

Rukkus
- Company type: Private company
- Website type: Ticket Marketplace
- Founded: New York City
- Headquarters: New York City, United States
- Area served: Worldwide
- Website: rukkus.com

Rukkus was a live entertainment search engine that explored 100+ ticket sites, as well as their network of private brokers, to pinpoint the lowest prices for concert, sports, and theater tickets. They discerned the best-valued ticket by using an analytical engine that compared a seat's distance from the action to the price of the ticket. Rukkus also showed stadium layouts for arena shows to allow visualization of one's seat, and allowed users to search for specific events by city or interest.

The company launched its mobile app in February 2014; it was named one of the five best ticket finder apps by iMore and a "genuine leap forward with loads of epic potential" by iPhone Savior. The Rukkus app was free, and featured 2 tap purchasing, as well as in-app music streaming and artist recommendations. As of August 17, 2018, the Rukkus app has been replaced with a new version powered by TickPick.

== History ==
The NYC-based startup was founded in 2011 by Manick Bhan, a Duke graduate and former Goldman Sachs employee with a vision to create "the Kayak.com of the event ticket world". Bhan worked on Rukkus with fellow former investment banker (and co-founder) Joe Messineo, third co-founder Angela McCrory, and at its peak, 17 other employees. On July 24, 2018, TickPick acquired the majority of Rukkus assets for an undisclosed amount.
