= Raji Arasu =

Indian American technology executive (born 1969)

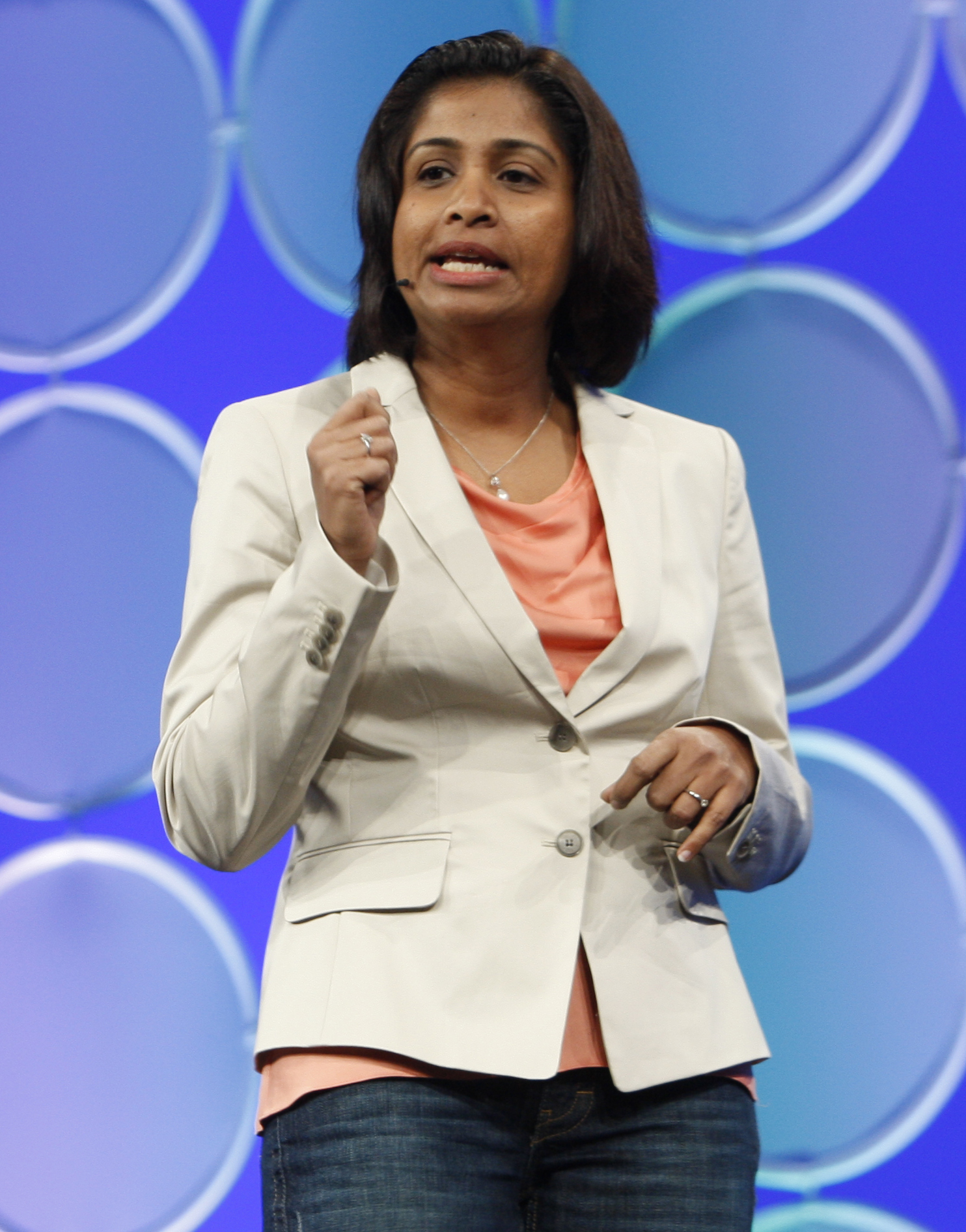
- Education: Pune University
- Occupations: CTO, Autodesk

Raji Arasu is an Indian American technology executive. She currently is the executive vice president and chief technology officer of Autodesk, where she drives the company's technology strategy to accelerate connectivity, intelligence, and productivity for customers, partners, and development teams. Previously as SVP of Platform Engineering at Intuit, Raji helped shape the platform strategy and technology culture, led the company's cloud transformation, and expanded foundational core capabilities that amplified innovation for customers.

Formerly she was Chief Technology Officer of eBay subsidiary, StubHub between 2011 and 2015, where she oversaw Product and Engineering functions. She held many executive positions at eBay for over a decade leading global technology organizations like selling, buying, checkout, payments, trust and safety, scaling the trading platform for a business that did $11B in revenue in 2011 doing 10,000 transactions per second. Raji has received public recognition for her work promoting and mentoring diversity and women in successful leadership roles in technology.

eBay described her as a "role model for women", given her work as a technology executive, which as of 2012 only 9% of woman filled. Silicon Valley/San Jose Business Journal named her as a Woman of Influence for 2011. In 2015 she was appointed director of NIC Inc. She serves on the board of directors for MediaAlpha Inc.

== Early life and career ==
Arasu was born in India and grew up with a range of typical childhood aspirations to become a teacher or astronaut. She eventually decided upon computer science, and earned a bachelor's degree in Computer Engineering from Pune University. Arasu began working in software development in the United States in the early 1990s. She specialized in online commerce and payments and led technology teams for several companies, including Oracle, her first employer. In 2000–2001, Arasu was director of engineering at MarchFirst.

In 2001, Arasu was appointed Vice President of Engineering for Trading for eBay, the world's largest marketplace. She managed the product and technological assets and was involved in improving the site experience and web services for sellers and buyers, the shipping, transactions and payments.

She was later Vice President of Engineering for Marketplaces at eBay. According to eBay during her 10-year stint with the internet giant she "helped tackle problems involving scalability, traffic and payments in the rapidly evolving world of ecommerce". Arasu has described her work at eBay as an exciting one given that she had a "direct impact upon the consumers" of eBay, and said that she was involved in bringing in new industry role models to teach women at the workplace in computer technology at eBay. As a result, eBay described Arasu herself as a "role model for women", especially given her work as a technology executive, which as of 2012 only 9% of woman filled. Computer World cited Arasu's views on lowering development costs of technology in 2009, in which she said, "Be aware of the latest technologies and open-source packages that offer new ways to lower development/ deployment costs". Before her departure, she was named by Silicon Valley/San Jose Business Journal as a Woman of Influence in 2011. She received the award at a formal awards dinner on 14 April 2011 and was mentioned in a special publication honoring notable female achievers of Silicon Valley.

== Recent career ==
In 2011, Arasu became Chief Technology Officer of eBay subsidiary, StubHub, the world's largest ticket retailer. As CTO and Vice President of Stubhub, she manages the product and engineering assets for StubHub, planning the deliverables, innovation and improving the site experience especially for mobile phone users, including developing the roadmap which enables mobile users to map out venues such as stadiums and theatres and nearby facilities. Arasu created a catalog in which fans can search events based on their preference and location, view and notes upcoming events, and can tag their favorite sports teams and bands which updates them of events throughout the year. She has said of her work for the company, "StubHub in many ways has directly impacted and helped in solving the same realm. There is a big wave that is happening in terms of social and the whole experience of social is transforming. Bringing that alive on our site as well as bringing pieces of our experiences alive in the social world, which is either experiences on Facebook or in other places where you see people talking about StubHub and event experiences in Twitter, many of that brings and connects fans in a big way." In a February 2013 article in The Boston Globe, Arasu stated that StubHub is focusing on product development and engineering and will grow to over 50 employees. In 2013 she spoke at the California Diversity & Leadership Conference.

In 2015, she was appointed Senior Vice President at Intuit's CTO organization.

In a 2015 interview with Forbes, Arasu spoke about her work with women and technology: "If you don’t have women at the seat of the table thinking of ideas, building products and tackling business problems, then you’re missing one part of the customer base.. Female students need to hear more about our failures compared to our successes. Everyone has lots and lots of struggles and failures before moving up." On 5 May 2015, Arasu was appointed director of NIC Inc.

As of 2021, she was announced as executive vice president and chief technology officer of design and make software technology Autodesk. Arasu was recruited for the role due to her background in handling large data platforms.
