= Ticket exchange =

A ticket exchange, also known as a secondary ticket outlet, is a market where tickets are bought and sold. Ticket exchanges allow people to buy and sell tickets online. Typically, ticket exchanges are used by individuals wanting to buy or resell tickets from other individuals rather than from the event the ticket is for. Originally, this industry was dominated by street-based touts working outside large events and venues, buying tickets cheaply from people who had spares and selling them on to last-minute buyers. While some street touts may still exist, the advent of the internet has transformed the practice. Secondary resale ticket markets today are predominantly online. There are two niches of ticket exchanges, also called secondary marketplaces: event tickets and travel reservations.

== Ticket exchange in events ==
The event ticket exchange business is predominantly dominated by Viagogo, alongside its long-time rival StubHub which it merged with in 2021. Among these big online ticket marketplaces, smaller companies are emerging offering slightly different servicing. For example, a marketplace that limits the price of the tickets to the current live price. There has been significant criticism of event ticket exchanges in recent years for enabling 'armchair' touts. These are groups of people who purchase a large number of event tickets with the intent to resell them at a mark-up on ticket exchanges before fans are able to purchase them for themselves.

== Ticket exchange in air travel ==
There are online marketplaces where people can offer their transferable flight tickets and hotel reservations for sale. For travellers without travel insurance, it can reduce losses when unable to travel. Flights are transferable if the name on the ticket can be changed. There are over 60 airlines which allow name changes. These airlines always charge a fee for this service. The resale of airline tickets depends on the rules of the airline.

Ticket exchanges for travel reservations also facilitate the resale of hotel rooms and package holidays, such as SpareFare.net.

== See also ==
- Online ticket brokering
- Ticket resale
- Tout
- Spiv
