= Eric Baker (businessman) =

American businessman

- Born: Eric H. Baker; Los Angeles, California, US
- Education: Harvard College; Stanford Business School (MBA)
- Known for: Founder and CEO, Viagogo; Co-founder, StubHub

Eric H. Baker is an American businessman. He co-founded StubHub in 2000 and created Viagogo six years later. He is chief executive officer (CEO) of StubHub Holdings, Inc, which owns the two ticketing marketplaces.

== Early life ==
Baker was born and grew up in Los Angeles. Baker graduated from Harvard College in 1995, and received an MBA from Stanford Business School in 2001.

== Career ==
Baker worked for McKinsey & Company for two years, and then Bain Capital, a private equity firm in Boston.

=== StubHub ===
A year after enrolling at Stanford, Baker co-founded StubHub in 2000 with classmate Jeff Fluhr.The idea came when Baker saw a Broadway play and struggled to buy secondhand tickets. He remembered the need for a more efficient way to buy these tickets and developed the idea during a Stanford competition. Baker and Fluhr withdrew from the competition after being chosen as finalists due to concerns that someone might take their idea. The two began to network with potential investors in the music and sports industries. By March 2000, the company was incorporated and five months later, the duo had raised $600,000 in seed funding. While Fluhr dropped out of Stanford to focus on StubHub full-time, Baker opted not to immediately join the company. While he was completing his MBA, the first version of the website launched without him in October 2000. He rejoined StubHub as its president in 2001. However, Baker and Fluhr clashed on the direction of the company and Baker was fired from StubHub in 2004.

In 2006, Baker moved to London. Baker did not sign a non-compete with StubHub so was able to launch a new ticketing marketplace, Viagogo, later that year. Viagogo initially focused on Europe and launched with inaugural partners Manchester United and Chelsea Football Club. Baker has been its CEO since then. Baker owns Viagogo through his Delaware-based company, originally named Pugnacious Endeavors.

In 2020, Viagogo completed its acquisition of StubHub out of eBay, with the combined company rebranding as StubHub and Baker as CEO.

==== Acquisition ====
Baker purchased StubHub from eBay in February 2020 through Pugnacious Endeavors, which was later renamed to StubHub Holdings, Inc. Baker is the CEO of StubHub Holdings, Inc. United Kingdom regulators approved the merger in September 2021.

The purchase coincided with the onset of the COVID-19 pandemic and the resulting pause in live events, which caused initial criticism of the deal. Forbes called the purchase ill-timed due to the pandemic causing cancelled tours, shows, and other live events. By 2024, audiences had returned and Stubhub had regained some marketshare that had been lost prior to the pandemic, but with high marketing expenditures.
