= Viagogo =

Ticket resale company

viagogo Entertainment Inc.
- Type: Subsidiary
- Industry: Ticket exchange; Ticket resale
- Founded: August 18, 2006; 19 years ago in London, England
- Founder: Eric Baker
- Headquarters: Wilmington, Delaware, United States
- Area served: Global
- Key people: Eric Baker (CEO)
- Parent: StubHub Holdings
- Website: viagogo.com

Viagogo Entertainment Inc., stylized as viagogo, is an American ticket exchange and ticket resale company headquartered in Delaware. It was founded in 2006 by Eric Baker. The company operates an online marketplace for the secondary sale of tickets and receives commissions from buyers and sellers on each order.

Viagogo purchased StubHub in February 2020 for approximately $4.05 billion; both companies are now owned by StubHub Holdings.

== History ==
=== 2006–2011: Early years ===
Eric Baker moved to London and founded Viagogo in 2006 after leaving StubHub, which he co-founded. Baker got the idea for Viagogo while discussing travel with a friend and noticed that Europe did not have a secondary ticket marketplace. Among initial investors were Andre Agassi, Steffi Graf, Bernard Arnault, Brent Hoberman, and Jacob Rothschild. Viagogo officially launched on 18 August 2006 and was primarily focused on the sale of sports tickets, but also included concerts, theatre, and arts events in its early offerings. It was one of the first ticket resale firms in Europe.

Baker signed deals with several groups and individuals to be their official ticket resellers, including Manchester United, Chelsea F.C., Madonna, Michael Jackson, the French Open, Bayern Munich, and Really Useful Group. The deal with Madonna was the second such deal between an artist and secondary ticketing platform; the first was between the Eagles and Ticketmaster. The agreements shared revenue on ticket fees between the partners. Selling tickets to football matches outside stadium grounds was illegal in the United Kingdom in 2006; Viagogo's football deals made the resale of those match tickets legal and were the first of their kind in the country.

In 2008, the Culture, Media and Sport Committee issued a report indicating that Viagogo and similar marketplaces offered a valuable service but should enact further protective practices, including a ban on the sale of free tickets to charity events and the sale of seats not yet available. Approximately $100 USD million in tickets were sold via Viagogo that year, with Viagogo making 25 percent of those sales, three times that of StubHub's first three years of operation. By that time, it had offices in the United Kingdom, the Netherlands, and Germany.

The All England Lawn Tennis and Croquet Club and England and Wales Cricket Board (ECB) criticized Viagogo in 2009 for its high prices. ECB cancelled 1,000 tickets for the Men's T20 World Cup that had been resold, and ECB said Viagogo "undermined" the group's business model. That year, Viagogo held a funding round that valued the company at £163.19 million. Its partnership with Manchester United ended in 2011.

A British court ruled in 2011 that Viagogo must provide information to the Rugby Football Union (RFU) on users who resold RFU tickets on the platform. Viagogo appealed the decision to the Supreme Court of the United Kingdom, which ruled in favor of the RFU, resulting in a Norwich Pharmacal order.

=== 2012–2019: Move to Switzerland and Oceania expansion ===
Viagogo moved its offices from the United Kingdom to Switzerland in 2012. Live music promoters were partnering with Viagogo to sell tickets for their acts by that year, including Rihanna and Coldplay. Promoters withheld some tickets from their primary sellers to sell first on Viagogo. The company and promoter then split the revenue. Madonna made the firm her official secondary ticket marketplace for her European tour in 2012. That year, fans of Mumford & Sons were turned away from a concert in Portsmouth, England, for having fraudulent tickets purchased through Viagogo. The company promised credits or refunds in the amount of the ticket and an internal investigation.

Viagogo launched in Australia in 2013, partnering with Collingwood and Richmond football clubs in the launch. The same year, the company partnered with the Scottish Rugby Union and the Isle of Wight Festival, marking the first time the firm entered into an agreement with a sports governing body and first to include facility naming rights. Viagogo signed its first partnership deal in Portugal in December 2013, partnering with FC Porto to be the club's ticket reseller. Viagogo and Soundwave partnered in 2015 to counter sales of fraudulent tickets. In 2016, Viagogo was accused of profiteering on benefit events for Cancer Research UK hosted by Peter Kay. Critics called on Viagogo to donate profits from the resale of event tickets. The same year, UEFA filed a criminal complaint in France against Viagogo, which they claimed was illegally selling tickets to the UEFA Euro 2016. Viagogo entered arbitration with SFX Entertainment in August 2016 for US$1.6 million in claims after the latter broke terms of a sponsorship contract with Viagogo.

The company was accused of profiteering on an Ed Sheeran concert to benefit teen cancer patients in 2017. The same year, the Australian Competition and Consumer Commission sued Viagogo for misleading advertising that claimed it was an official ticket reseller for events with which it did not have a partnership. It made changes to its website and dropped the use of "official" in its advertising in December 2017. The company was fined A$7 million in 2020 by the Federal Court of Australia as a result of the suit. A website "glitch" in 2017 caused dozens of customers in the United Kingdom to be overcharged. Viagogo was accused of withholding refunds by those customers. Index reported Viagogo was selling tickets to a nonexistent Ádám Kiss performance in 2018.

The Regional Court of Hamburg granted FIFA a preliminary injunction against Viagogo to prevent the company from selling tickets to the 2018 FIFA World Cup on its German website before FIFA could offer them as the primary seller. FIFA filed a criminal complaint against Viagogo in Switzerland in June of that year, alleging that the company was breaching competition law by selling tickets to the World Cup. The same Hamburg court issued a preliminary injunction against Viagogo that barred it from selling tickets to Rammstein concerts in Germany for the band's 2019 tour. Rammstein was granted a second order against Viagogo with the same restrictions in 2022.

The New Zealand Commerce Commission sued Viagogo in 2018 for falsely representing ticket prices, representing itself as an official ticket seller, that tickets were on the verge of selling out, and that customers would receive valid tickets, all in violation of the Fair Trading Act. In 2020, Viagogo announced changes to its New Zealand website to align with Commerce Commission standards, including an upfront estimation of all fees. The regulator subsequently dropped its push for an interim injunction, but continued its litigation. Complaints were filed against Viagogo in 2021 for allegedly misleading consumers about being the official ticket seller for events in Wellington, New Zealand. The Commerce Commission's lawsuit concluded in 2024, with the High Court of New Zealand ordering Viagogo to make updates to its website to provide more clear information to consumers and update its terms and conditions to make it clear grievances can be heard by New Zealand courts. Viagogo appealed the decision.

==== Conflict with British regulators ====
The United Kingdom revised rules for secondary ticket sellers in 2015, requiring that they include row and seat numbers in listings. Viagogo pledged to improve the information provided to customers. The country's Competition and Markets Authority (CMA) and National Trading Standards (NTS) opened investigations into four secondary ticket marketplaces the following year: StubHub, Viagogo, Seatwave, and GetMeIn. The investigation concerned relationships and data sharing between ticket touts and the resale platforms.

Viagogo declined to attend hearings held by the Culture, Media and Sport Committee (CMSC) in 2017 on the secondary ticket market, saying it does not sell tickets directly and does not have "adequate representation" in the United Kingdom. Members of Parliament accused the company of fraud in its absence and suggested that it was working with Google to dominate search results. Nigel Adams and Sharon Hodgson attempted to visit the company's London office after it declined to attend the hearing, but were turned away by security. The CMA raided Viagogo's offices in 2017 to acquire information for the investigation and subsequently expanded its scope to include advertising for tickets not yet in stock and high-pressure sales tactics. The investigation found that Viagogo was not providing adequate information to consumers on what seats they were purchasing and that it had not complied with a 2015 commitment to improve information available to consumers. The CMA threatened to take Viagogo to court if the company did not comply with its demands. In May 2018, Margot James called for a boycott of the company.

The agency filed a case against Viagogo in the High Court of Justice in August 2018. That month, the company moved much of its staff to New York and began paying its sellers through its American office.

The CMSC held additional hearings on secondary ticketing and the companies that sold those tickets in September 2018. Viagogo was invited to give testimony, but did not attend, citing legal advice received while the investigations were ongoing. In the hearings, music promoter Stuart Galbraith criticized Viagogo for its practices, calling it the "last major boil left to lance" in the ticketing industry. Arctic Monkeys manager Ian McAndrew called for the closure of Viagogo after seeing tickets for the band's shows being sold for £2,200. Viagogo sued Galbraith that year for allegedly opening fraudulent Viagogo stalls during Ed Sheeran's ÷ Tour and confiscating tickets that had been purchased through Viagogo. Sheeran imposed strict rules on tour tickets, including in the ticket terms that resold tickets would be cancelled, and Galbraith negotiated with ticket resale platforms to ensure they would not list tour tickets for sale; Viagogo was the only ticket resale marketplace that did not agree to prevent listings of tickets for the tour. In May 2018, the Advertising Standards Authority (ASA) referred Viagogo to NTS for failure to make all fees clear to consumers. It withdrew its complaint in September 2018 following "significant changes" that were made to Viagogo's website.

The High Court sided with the CMA in November 2018 and ordered Viagogo to make substantive changes to the way it presents information to consumers, including the publication of ticket face value, seat number, risk of being turned away at the door of the venue for improper resale, and the identity of the seller, including if the seller is a professional ticket salesperson. The CMSC called for a boycott of Viagogo in March 2019 following the publication of its report on secondary ticketing. The CMA sought contempt of court charges against Viagogo the same year for failing to comply with previous orders on publishing the details of professional ticket resellers and restrictions on ticket resale for consumers, clarity of ticket availability, and providing the full address of businesses selling tickets. In July of that year, Google suspended Viagogo's advertising account. The suspension was partially lifted four months later in locales where it was shown that Viagogo was not violating local laws. The CMA suspended its contempt action against Viagogo in September 2019.

=== 2020–present: Acquisition of StubHub and continued operations ===
In November 2019, it was announced that Viagogo would purchase StubHub for $4.05 billion. A week prior to the announcement, the United States House Committee on Energy and Commerce announced it would be investigating ticket sales and sellers and requested information from Live Nation Entertainment and StubHub on their practices. The CMA opened an investigation into the acquisition. While it was ongoing, the companies were barred from integrating, though the sale could continue. Baker completed the sale in February 2020, approximately 5 weeks before the coronavirus pandemic shut down live events across the world. The pandemic led to the company losing approximately 90 percent of its revenue, according to analyst reports. Due to its timing with the pandemic, Forbes's Noah Kirsch described the transaction as "one of the worst deals in history".

Viagogo was sued in 2020 for withholding refunds to shows cancelled by the pandemic. The company denied it was withholding refunds, and a judge in Florida refused to grant complainants class action status in July 2021. Viagogo reduced its staff in County Limerick by 170 as a result of the pandemic.

The StubHub purchase was finalized in September 2021 after receiving final clearance from the CMA. Both were placed under the management of a new company, StubHub Holdings. Viagogo was owned by Pugnacious LLC until its purchase of StubHub and the subsequent creation of StubHub Holdings and StubHub International. As part of the deal, the CMA required StubHub to sell its operations outside North America to Digital Fuel Capital. Baker became chief executive of the new company. It closed its offices in Hong Kong and San Francisco in 2022. Nayaab Islam was named company president that year.

== See also ==
- Better Online Tickets Sales Act
- List of United Kingdom Supreme Court cases
- Online ticket brokering
