= Scott Cutler (business executive) =

Business executive

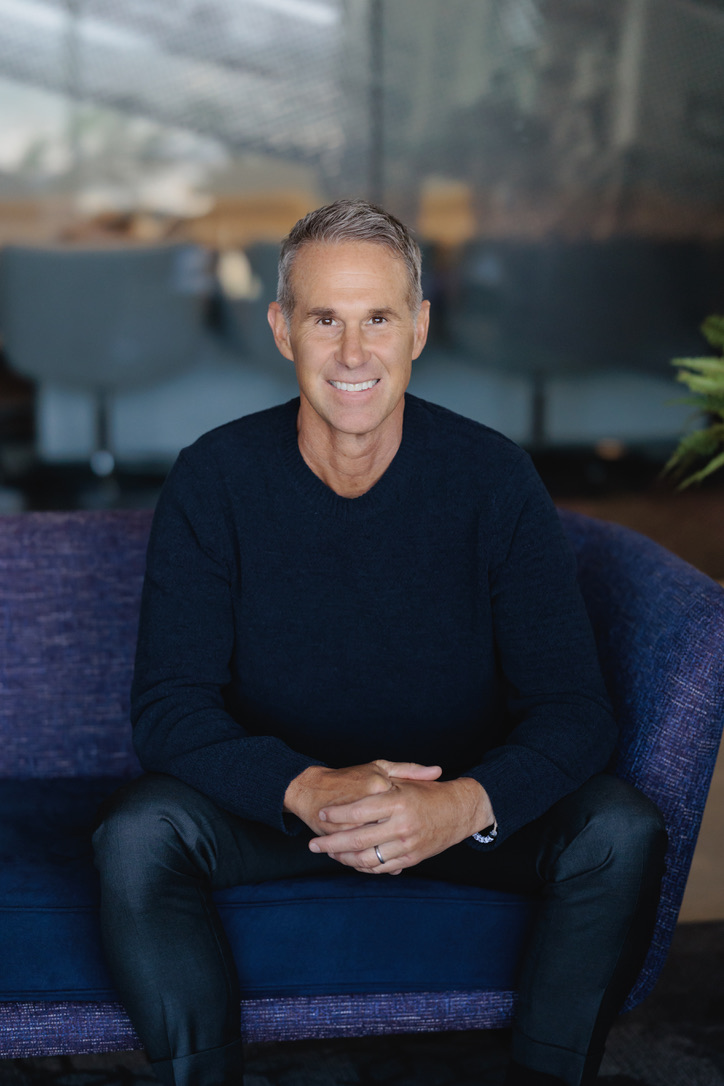
- Scott Cutler in 2025
- Born: 1969
- Education: Brigham Young University; UC Hastings
- Occupation: Business executive
- Years active: 1997-present
- Known for: Leadership roles at HealthEquity, StockX, eBay, and the New York Stock Exchange

Scott Cutler (born 1969) is an American business executive and technology leader who was the President and Chief Executive Officer of HealthEquity, Inc. Under his leadership, the company has focused on expanding beyond its traditional role as a health savings account administrator toward a broader healthcare and financial technology platform designed to help consumers save, spend, and invest for healthcare through a unified, technology-enabled experience.

Cutler previously was Chief Executive Officer of StockX, and held senior roles at eBay, StubHub, and the New York Stock Exchange.

== Early life and education ==
Cutler earned a bachelor's degree in economics from Brigham Young University in Provo, Utah, and a Juris Doctor from University of California, Hastings College of Law. Cutler is still involved in BYU, where he has been on the National Advisory Council since 2014.

== Career ==
=== Early career ===
Cutler began his professional career as a corporate securities lawyer at Cooley Godward Kronish LLP. He subsequently worked in investment banking at Thomas Weisel Partners and later held a leadership role in software investment banking at Cowen and Company.

=== New York Stock Exchange ===
In 2006, Cutler joined the New York Stock Exchange (NYSE), where he held senior leadership roles including head of global listings and executive vice president. During his tenure, he contributed to changes in listing requirements that expanded eligibility for companies and helped increase the number of firms able to qualify for listing. He also led initiatives to strengthen relationships with technology companies and expand NYSE's share of technology listings.

=== StubHub and eBay ===
In 2015, Cutler was appointed President of StubHub, an eBay subsidiary. In that role, he oversaw the company's transition to a mobile-first marketplace and growth in ticket sales. He later became Senior Vice President for the Americas at eBay, overseeing marketplace operations across North and South America.

=== StockX ===
Cutler was Chief Executive Officer of StockX, a global e-commerce marketplace, from 2019 to 2024. During his tenure, the company expanded globally and scaled its user base by strengthening consumer trust and transparency.

== Board memberships and affiliations ==
Cutler is on the board of directors of Brookfield Asset Management Ltd. and Vibrant Emotional Health, a nonprofit organization that operates the 988 Suicide and Crisis Lifeline.

== Personal life ==
Outside work, Cutler enjoys athletics, completing marathons in Seattle, Sacramento, St. George, Napa, and New York City and in 9 stages of the Tour de France. He also enjoys Alpine mountaineering, having climbed numerous peaks in North Cascades and the Sierra Nevada, ski-touring across the Swiss Alps, and fly-fishing. Cutler and his wife have four children.
