= Seatwave =

- Type: Private
- Industry: e-commerce
- Founded: London, UK (2006)
- Defunct: November 27, 2018; 7 years ago
- Headquarters: London, UK
- Key people: Joe Cohen (founder)
- Products: Online secondary ticketing, online ticket marketplace
- Parent: Ticketmaster
- Website: www.seatwave.com

Seatwave was an online ticket marketplace for buying and selling tickets to music, sporting and cultural events. Seatwave was founded in May 2006. Ticket sellers used to be able to list their tickets on Seatwave and specify what price they would be willing to sell them for. Buyers could browse the site, compare ticket prices and could then purchase the ticket they feel was the best deal.

Seatwave's TicketIntegrity guarantee ensured buyers that would get the tickets they ordered by the day of the event. If they didn't, Seatwave would find them replacement tickets, or refund the buyer.

On 13 August 2018, Seatwave parent company Ticketmaster Ltd announced its intention to close Seatwave in October 2018, and move secondary ticketing services to its main website, in a bid to combat exploitation of the service by ticket touts.

On 27 November 2018, Seatwave was closed, no longer accepting new ticket listings or purchases. The company is currently closed down, and has yet to announce a reopening date.

== Founder and investors ==
Seatwave was founded by Joe Cohen, formerly of Match.com and Ticketmaster, in May 2006 and began online trading in February 2007. Seatwave secured $25 million in February 2008 in a Series C funding round led by Fidelity Ventures and including existing investors Atlas Venture, Mangrove Capital Partners and AdInvest. On 1 June 2009, Seatwave announced it had raised $17 million in fourth round Series D of funding, taking the company's funding total to $53 million / €38 million.

Seatwave was featured on Media Momentum's "Ones to Watch" list in 2008 and in 2009, won their "Fastest Growing Company Award & Best Management" Award. Seatwave was awarded Online Business of the Year award in the Fast Growth Business Media Awards 2009 and was awarded first place in the inaugural Tech Media Invest 100 in 2009, in association with The Guardian, PricewaterhouseCoopers, Kemp Little and Europe Unlimited.

In January 2013, Joe Cohen stepped down as CEO of Seatwave to become the company's non-executive chairman. Ajay Chowdhury was appointed CEO of Seatwave in September 2013.

== Board appointments ==
Marty Pompadour joined the company as a non-executive director in 2008 but resigned on 23 June 2010.

Board members also include Fred Destin, a blogger who often wrote about Seatwave. Destin was a partner at Atlas Venture's London office when the firm made its initial investment in Seatwave back in 2006. In 2010, Atlas Ventures closed its London office and Destin relocated to Boston.

To prevent football hooliganism, the resale of football tickets in the UK was made illegal within the Criminal Justice and Public Order Act 1994. Resale of football tickets is only legal when expressly permitted by the individual club. As of 2011, Seatwave is the approved secondary ticket partner of Fulham FC.

Seatwave has partnered with Grand Union Management who manage artists including The Enemy and Reverend and the Makers.

=== Testimony at 2007 Parliamentary enquiry ===
In 2007, the UK's Department for Culture, Media and Sport appointed a Select Committee to investigate ticket touting and outline recommendations on legislative measures. On 10 January 2008, the Select Committee published a report which summarised their findings. They identified 12 key benefits and 14 key detriments for consumers. Seatwave testified at the inquiry where Joe Cohen presented his view on touting.

In April 2008, the government responded to the Select Committee's reports supporting the findings that legislation should be a last resort, identifying a need for the primary ticketing market to be improved and urging all players in the industry to work together to develop a voluntary code of principles. Seatwave has declined to join any trade association connected with secondary ticketing in Europe, citing fundamental differences.
