= Tout =

Person who solicits business or employment in a persistent and annoying manner

A tout is any person who solicits business or employment in a persistent and annoying manner (generally equivalent to a solicitor or barker in American English, or a spruiker in Australian English).

An example would be a person who frequents heavily touristed areas and presents himself as a tour guide (particularly towards those who do not speak the local language) but operates on behalf of local bars, restaurants, or hotels, being paid to direct tourists towards certain establishments.

== Types ==
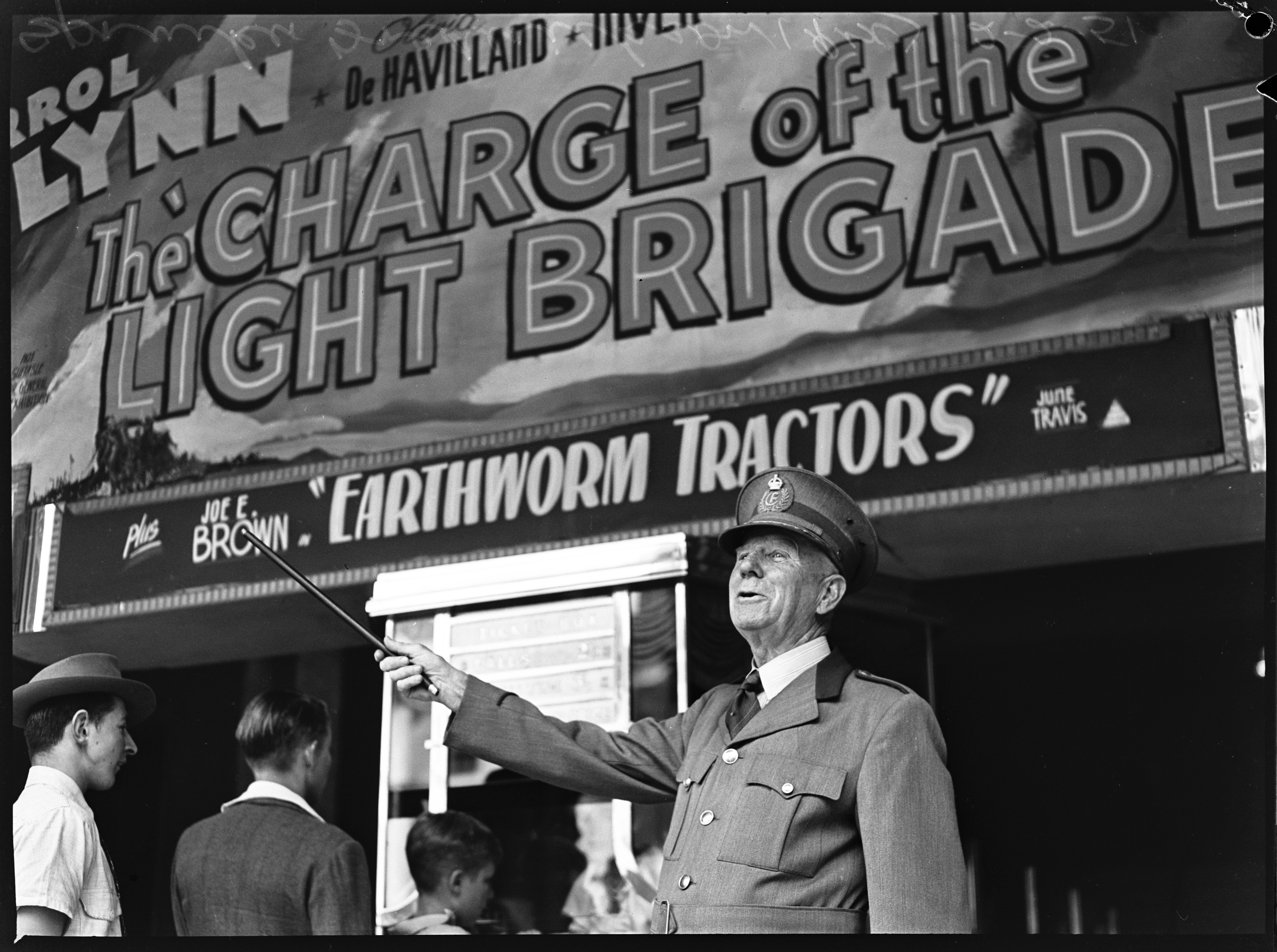
Theatre spruiker, Australia, 1951

In London, the term "taxi touts" refers to a kind of illegal taxi operation which involves taxi drivers (or their operator) attracting potential passengers by illegal means—for instance, calling out travellers, or fetching them and their luggage, while parked in an area where taxi drivers must wait in their vehicle. They may charge exorbitant fees upon arrival, possibly using threats to ensure payment.

"Ticket tout" is a British term for a scalper, someone who engages in ticket resale for more than the face value of the ticket. In recent years some British ticket touts have moved into Internet ticket fraud.

In the sports betting world, a tout is someone who sells picks of winners against the spread and the over/under. Most touts are scam artists and most don't have a long term winning record.

A "shop tout" is someone who is engaged by a shop to loiter outside their office, sometimes outside the building, or outside their competitors' shop. The tout then promotes the services to a passer-by and then escorts the person back to the shop, where they are paid a commission for each person that is brought back. The practice of touts working on the street to attract customers to night clubs and bars is very common in the entertainment tourist areas of Japan (particularly those of Roppongi and Kabukicho), Hungary, Turkey, Serbia, and Spain.

== Informants ==
In Ireland, a tout is an informant, a term which includes supergrass.

== See also ==
- Handicapping
- Tipster
