= StubHub =

American ticket brokering company

- Type: Subsidiary
- Industry: Ticket exchange; Ticket resale
- Founded: March 2000; 26 years ago in San Francisco, California, US
- Founders: Eric Baker; Jeff Fluhr
- Area served: North America
- Key people: Eric Baker (CEO); Nayaab Islam (president)
- Services: Event ticket sales
- Revenue: ▲US$1.77 billion (2024)
- Number of employees: 650 (2022)
- Parent: StubHub Holdings
- Website: stubhub.com

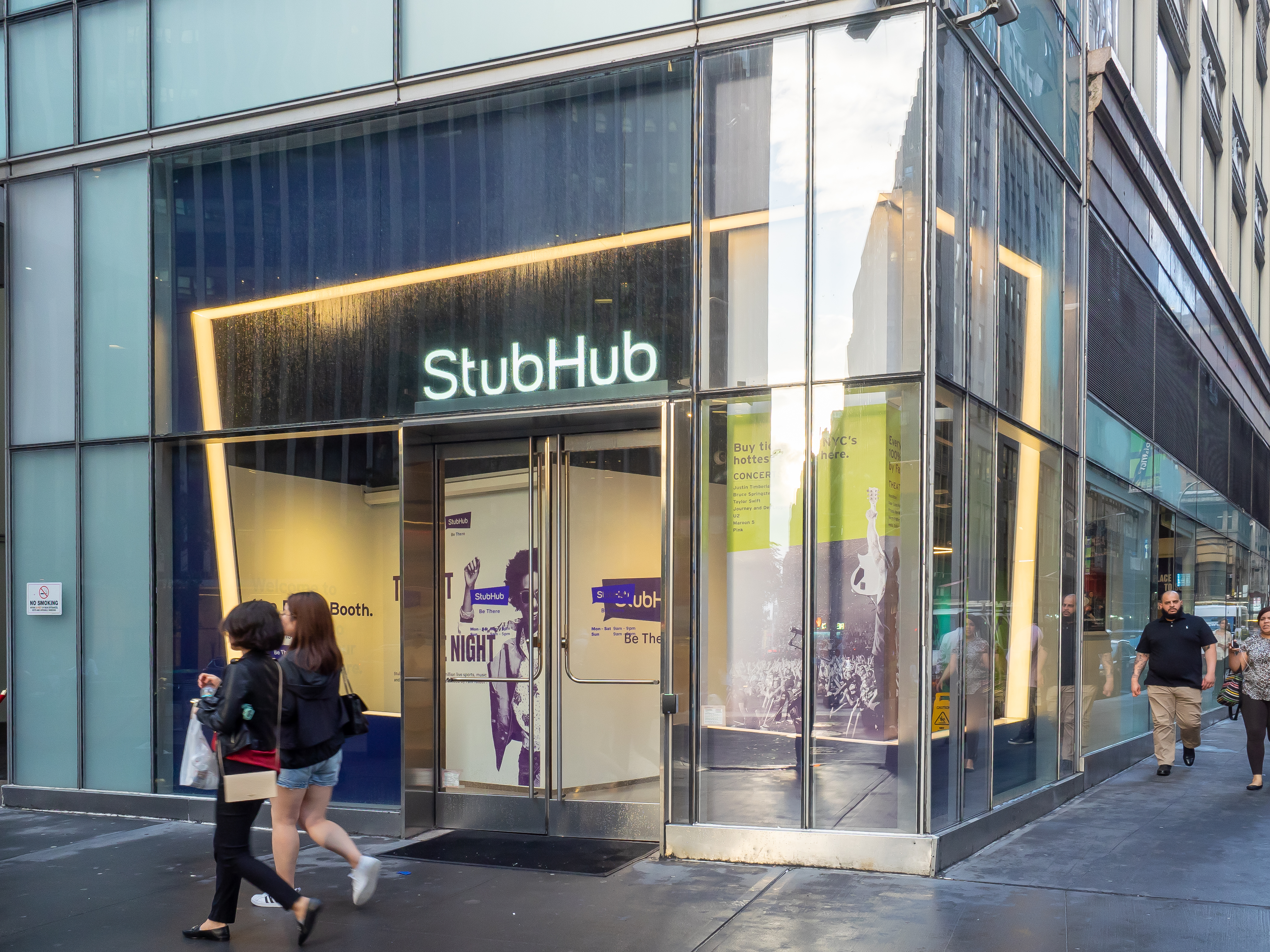
New York City's Walk-In Store

StubHub is an American ticket resale broker and a primary ticket outlet. It is a subsidiary of StubHub Holdings, which also owns Viagogo. The company receives commissions from buyers and sellers on each order.

StubHub was founded in 2000 by Eric Baker and Jeff Fluhr in San Francisco. It was sold to eBay in 2007 for US$310 million. Viagogo, led by Baker, repurchased StubHub in 2020 for approximately US$4 billion, forming Stubhub Holdings, which became a public company in 2025.

StubHub has partnerships with professional sports leagues and companies including Major League Baseball and Anschutz Entertainment Group. It was the first company to purchase an advertisement patch on an NBA jersey. The company was a subject of investigations into ticket scalping by the United Kingdom's Competition and Markets Authority.

The company has offices in Los Angeles, New York City, Taiwan, China, Ireland, and Switzerland.

== History ==
=== Founding and early years ===
Eric Baker had the idea for an online secondhand event ticket marketplace after he struggled to purchase secondhand tickets for a showing of The Lion King on Broadway. He began developing the concept with Jeff Fluhr as part of a competition while both were students at Stanford Graduate School of Business. In March 2000, the pair incorporated StubHub in San Francisco to act as that marketplace. The company raised US$600,000 in seed funding by August 2000. Fluhr left school to be chief executive officer of StubHub; Baker graduated in 2001 and became company president. That year, StubHub signed its first deal with a professional sports team, partnering with the Seattle Mariners. In 2002, eBay was in talks to acquire StubHub for US$20 million, although the agreement had later "fallen apart over price." By its third year of operation, StubHub had 60 employees. The company was incorporated on December 17, 2004 as Pugnacious Endeavors.

Fluhr described a 2004 falling out between himself and Baker over the company direction. Baker wanted to develop partnerships with sports leagues while Fluhr preferred to focus on building the StubHub brand. The difference in direction led to Baker leaving the company while retaining a 10 percent ownership stake. Baker founded competing agency Viagogo to operate in European markets in 2006. StubHub had a positive cash flow in 2005 with sales of approximately US$200 million and revenues of approximately US$50 million. The company successfully lobbied for law changes in New York, Florida, and Pennsylvania regarding ticket sales and the amount above face value for which tickets could be sold. StubHub made approximately US$6,500 in campaign donations to Florida legislators while lobbying for the law change in that state. In 2006, the value of tickets sold on the platform was approximately US$400 million and it generated approximately US$100 million in revenue. The company employed approximately 350 people at 12 locations.

=== Acquisition by eBay ===
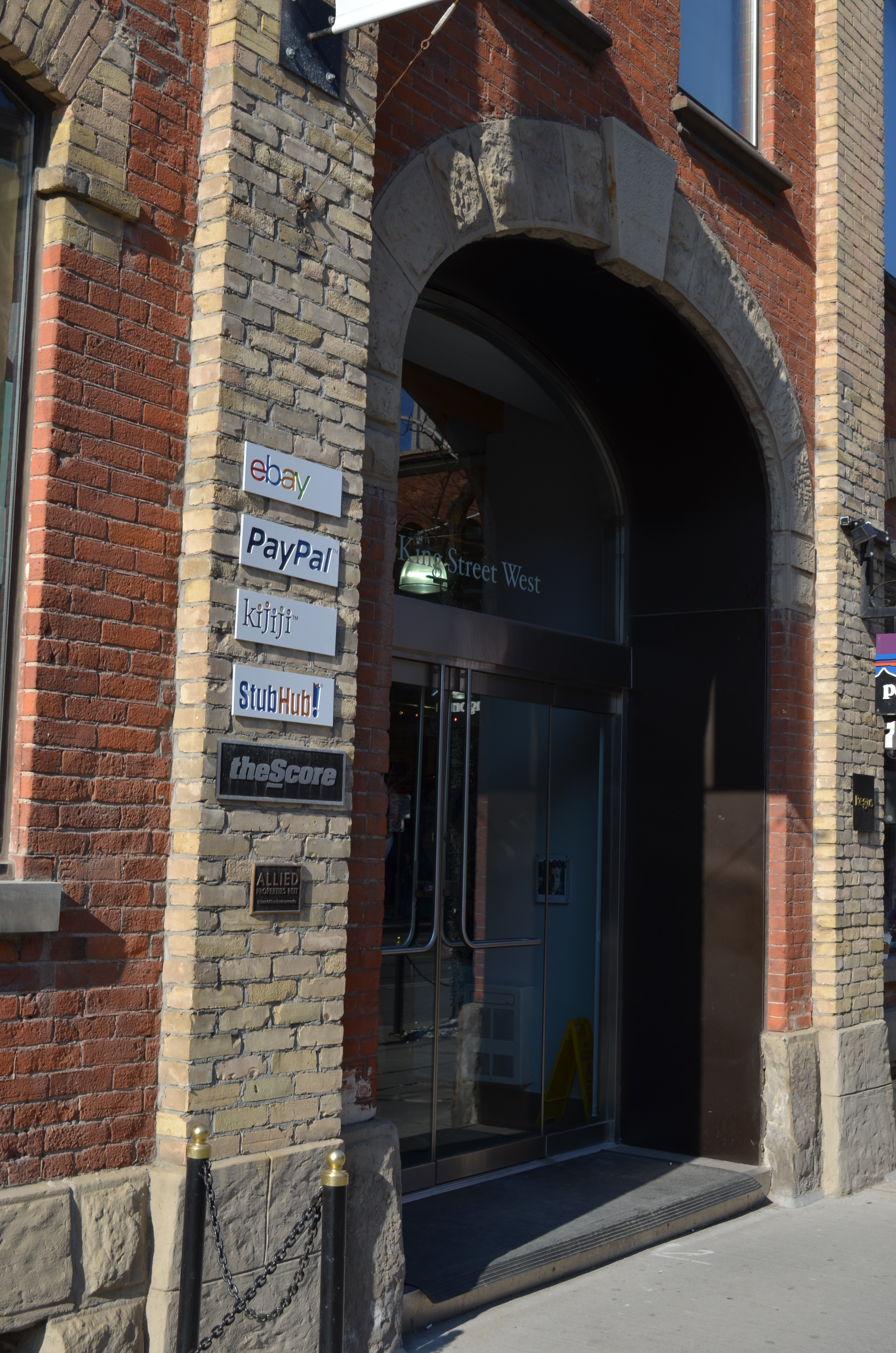
eBay, PayPal, Kijiji, and StubHub in Toronto

Fluhr sold StubHub to eBay in 2007 for US$310 million and left the company. Chris Tsakalakis became company president. By 2008, StubHub was selling approximately US$5 billion in tickets annually. It had partnerships with 30 college and professional sports teams, including those in the NFL and NBA, by the time of eBay's purchase. Some teams took exception to StubHub's business model, with the New England Patriots suing the company in November 2006 for allegedly encouraging customers to break Massachusetts law by selling tickets for more than US$2 above their face value. StubHub countersued, saying the Patriots were engaging in unfair trade practices. A Massachusetts Superior Court judge in 2007 ordered StubHub to provide the Patriots with a list of 13,000 users who had sold or purchased game tickets. The suit was settled under undisclosed terms in 2009.

In 2006, more than 100 New York Yankees season-ticket holders suspected of reselling their regular-season seats on StubHub received letters denying them the right to buy playoff tickets and barring them from buying season tickets for the 2007 season. StubHub criticized the policy as "a witch hunt against us and eBay for giving fans more access to these games". The New York Yankees revoked the season tickets of those who resold them on StubHub, saying that doing so violated its licensing policy.

Ticketmaster sued StubHub in 2007 for offering "official premium tickets" to events for which Ticketmaster had exclusivity deals. The suit claimed StubHub intentionally interfered with Ticketmaster's venue contracts. StubHub said the tickets were being resold by the management company for the acts, Ticketmaster's fees had been paid, and that StubHub never owned any ticket inventory. The following year, Ticketmaster developed a method of paperless ticketing that made it difficult to transfer or resell tickets, implementing the methodology prior to an AC/DC concert in Detroit. StubHub opposed the blocking of ticket transfers, saying that it hindered the choices available to purchasers.

Major League Baseball partnered with StubHub in 2007 to become the league's official online ticket reseller. The agreement between the league and StubHub was renewed in 2012 with modifications, including a minimum price of US$6 for tickets and inclusion of all fees at the time of selecting seats, which StubHub said corrected an "optics issue" caused by fees not being calculated until later in the purchase process. This pricing structure was known as "all-in" pricing, which StubHub made standard across all ticket sales in 2013. Some teams, including the Yankees and Los Angeles Angels, opted out of the renewal. StubHub reversed its all-in pricing in 2015 due to declining sales. It had revenues of approximately US$940 million in 2016.

By May 2011, StubHub had 62 partners across entertainment fields, including with the Fiesta Bowl, Boston Red Sox, and Ultimate Fighting Championship. It partnered with Paciolan in 2011 and in conjunction with that deal had partnered with 23 colleges and universities in the United States. StubHub launched a pilot program in the United Kingdom in December 2011 and began full operations in the country in March 2012. In November 2012, the company became the exclusive secondary ticketing partner of Anschutz Entertainment Group and AXS, AEG's ticketing platform.

StubHub was criticized by organizers of 12-12-12: The Concert for Sandy Relief in December 2012 for allowing scalpers to resell tickets to the event for significant markups while proceeds did not go to the relief effort. In response, the company donated its fees for the ticket sales, totaling approximately US$500,000, to the Robin Hood Foundation. The Yankees sued StubHub for opening an office within 1,500 feet of Yankee Stadium in March 2013. The parties settled under undisclosed terms the following month. StubHub signed a three-year sponsorship deal with Jockey Club Racecourses to sell tickets for events at Sandown Park, Epsom Downs, and Kempton Park in 2013. The same year, it purchased the naming rights for the Home Depot Center, the stadium of the LA Galaxy, in a six-year deal. As of October 2013, StubHub had partnerships with 35 college sports teams, including the universities of Florida, Georgia, North Carolina, and Wisconsin.

Tsakalakis resigned in November 2014. By that time, company revenue had grown to approximately US$2 billion. He was succeeded by Scott Cutler. StubHub added PayPal integration for Android users, personalization algorithms, and the ability present a barcode within the app to gain entry to event venues in May 2015. In May 2015, the company partnered with BandPage to feature ticket listings in search results. In July 2015, StubHub partnered with Uber to allow fans to request a ride to events. In August 2015, StubHub and Everton F.C. extended their partnership under which StubHub continued to be the official ticket marketplace for Everton F.C. until the end of the 2016/17 season. In August 2015, StubHub partnered with Spotify to integrate a person’s music library and upcoming concerts and events. In August 2015, the company partnered with Amazon to integrate into Amazon Echo.

The same year, StubHub sued Ticketmaster and the Golden State Warriors in an antitrust lawsuit that alleged the latter two had conspired to reduce resale of tickets on StubHub's platform by telling ticketholders that reselling through platforms other than Ticketmaster was unsafe. The suit was dismissed in November 2015.

The United Kingdom revised rules for secondary ticket sellers in 2015, requiring that sellers include row and seat numbers. StubHub pledged to improve the information provided to customers. The country's Competition and Markets Authority (CMA) opened an investigation into four secondary ticket marketplaces the following year: StubHub, Viagogo, Seatwave, and GetMeIn. The investigation concerned relationships and data sharing between ticket scalpers and the resale platforms. Documents released with the Paradise Papers showed Julien Lavallee was using StubHub, Vivid Seats and Ticketmaster to run a multimillion dollar ticket resale business. According to a November 9, 2017 article published in The Toronto Star, Lavallée was able to expand his business using "exploitative tactics" that "gam[e] the ticket marketplace and put entertainment beyond the reach of millions of fans who can’t compete with large-scale scalping operations."

Documents in the papers suggested Lavallee and StubHub had a partnership to expand Lavallee's operation to the United Kingdom. Investigations started by the CMA and Trading Standards as a result of the Paradise Papers showed StubHub offered a separate section of its website for high-volume ticket sellers, with tools that made it easier to batch upload tickets and reduced fees for hitting certain sales volumes. They also showed it likely that Lavellee used bots to purchase large volumes of tickets for resale. The CMA raided StubHub's offices in 2017 to acquire information for the investigation and subsequently expanded its scope to include advertising for tickets not yet in stock and high-pressure sales tactics. StubHub made a "formal commitment" to improve information provided to consumers in April 2018. In 2020, the CMA said StubHub was not providing adequate information to customers about venues that may not accept resold tickets, was engaging in high-pressure sales tactics, and was not providing exact locations of seats and addresses of vendors. The company said it was working to resolve "valid concerns" raised by the CMA.

StubHub was the first company to purchase a jersey advertisement patch with one of the big four American sports leagues, signing a 3-year, US$15 million deal with the Philadelphia 76ers to put a patch on players' jerseys beginning in the 2017-2018 season. StubHub sold US$4.75 billion worth of tickets in 44 countries in 2018. Sukhinder Singh Cassidy was named company president of StubHub that year, replacing Cutler, who became a senior vice president within eBay. StubHub argued in favor of mandating "all-in" pricing in the United States during Congressional testimony in 2020.

=== Acquisition by Viagogo and Eric Baker ===
In November 2019, it was announced that Viagogo, the company Baker founded after leaving StubHub, would purchase StubHub for US$4.05 billion. A week prior to the announcement, the United States House Committee on Energy and Commerce announced it would be investigating ticket sales and sellers and requested information from Live Nation Entertainment and StubHub on their practices. The CMA opened an investigation into the acquisition. While it was ongoing, the companies were barred from integrating, though the sale could continue. Baker completed the sale in February 2020, approximately 5 weeks before the COVID-19 lockdowns. The COVID-19 pandemic led to the company losing approximately 90% of its revenue. Due to its timing with the pandemic, Forbes's Noah Kirsch described the transaction as "one of the worst deals in history".

The purchase by Viagogo was finalized in September 2021. Both were placed under the management of a new company, StubHub Holdings. As part of the deal, the CMA required StubHub to sell its operations outside North America; the Stubhub International brand was sold to Digital Fuel Capital. Baker became chief executive of the company. It closed its offices in Hong Kong and San Francisco in 2022. Nayaab Islam was named company president that year. In 2024, Attorney General for the District of Columbia Brian Schwalb filed a lawsuit against StubHub alleging the company was using drip pricing and a countdown clock to create a false sense of urgency, thereby misleading customers. StubHub said its practices comply with the law, are consistent with the practices of competitors, and that it supported uniform "all-in" pricing regulations.

In May 2023, the company partnered with The Athletic to sell tickets to events featured on The Athletic.

StubHub Holdings had revenues of US$1.77 billion in 2024.

StubHub Holdings became a public company via an initial public offering in September 2025. The IPO came after previous delays in 2022 and early 2024.

In 2026, some StubHub customers were unable to retrieve their tickets for the 2026 FIFA World Cup. Fans and their families lost thousands of US dollars for tickets purchased on the platform, transportation, and accommodations. They received invalid tickets, tickets that were different than offered, or failed to receive them. In the US, in the Manhattan Federal Court, they filed a US$5 million class action lawsuit against the platform. A similar class action lawsuit was filed in British Columbia, Canada where a Vancouver man spent more than US$19,000 for tickets he didn't receive.

In June 2026, StubHub UK was ordered by the Competition and Markets Authority to refund over 50,000 customers and pay a fine of almost £900,000 for drip pricing, the illegal practice of not showing the full price at the time of booking.

StubHub spent $3.4 million in lobbying efforts against a 2026 bill introduced by California State Assembly member Matt Haney which would have made it illegal to resell live entertainment tickets for over 10% of face value, leading the bill to fail to pass.

== See also ==
- Raji Arasu
- List of companies founded by Stanford University alumni
- List of acquisitions by eBay
- List of NBA jersey sponsors
