= Ticketmaster =

American ticket sales company

Ticketmaster Entertainment, LLC
- Type: Subsidiary
- Industry: Entertainment
- Founded: October 2, 1976; 50 years ago, in Phoenix, Arizona, U.S.
- Founders: Albert Leffler; Peter Gadwa; Gordon Gunn III; Jerry Nelson
- Headquarters: Beverly Hills, California, U.S.
- Area served: Worldwide
- Key people: Michael Rapino (CEO); Saumil Mehta (president)
- Products: Ticketing technology; Ticket sales; Ticket resales; Marketing; Distribution of event tickets and information; Support of venue renovation
- Revenue: $23.16 billion (2024)
- Number of employees: 6,678
- Parent: Live Nation Entertainment (2010–present)
- Website: ticketmaster.com

Ticketmaster Entertainment, LLC is an American ticket sales and distribution company based in Beverly Hills, California, with operations in many countries around the world. In 2010, it merged with events/concert promoter Live Nation under the name Live Nation Entertainment, with both brand names continuing to operate as subsidiaries of Live Nation Entertainment.

The company's ticket sales are fulfilled digitally or at its two main fulfillment centers located in Charleston, West Virginia, and Pharr, Texas, for both primary and secondary markets. Ticketmaster's clients include venues, artists and promoters. Clients control their events and set ticket prices, and Ticketmaster sells tickets that the clients make available to them. Ticketmaster also owns and operates TicketWeb, a ticketing website geared towards independent venues.

Ticketmaster is subject to numerous controversies and lawsuits, alleging violations of various laws. The platform charges a fee on tickets purchased and resold on the platform. The fees from ticket sales can account for a large percentage of overall ticket costs and have received scrutiny from regulators, customers, and musicians. The company has also faced scrutiny from the United States Department of Justice for retaliation against venues violating its 2010 10-year consent decree from the Live Nation merger, which was extended an additional five years from 2020 through 2025.

Following the widespread criticism of the company's handling of the pre-sale of Taylor Swift's the Eras Tour in November 2022, the Department of Justice (DOJ) began a formal investigation into Live Nation Entertainment on the grounds of monopoly, antitrust law and consumer rights violations. The U.S. Senate Judiciary Committee examined the merger with a hearing in January 2023. On May 23, 2024, the DOJ and a coalition of 29 states formally launched an antitrust suit against Live Nation and Ticketmaster. An additional 10 states joined the lawsuit, bringing the total number of co-plaintiffs to 40. In April 2026, a jury verdict was reached which found that Ticketmaster parent company Live Nation Entertainment held an illegal monopoly which violated federal and state anti-trust laws and enabled Ticketmaster to overcharge in ticket prices.

== History ==
Ticketmaster was founded in Phoenix, Arizona in 1976 by college staffers Peter Gadwa and Albert Leffler, Gordon Gunn III, as well as businessman Jerry Nelson. The company originally licensed computer programs and sold hardware for ticketing systems. Its first ticketed concert was Electric Light Orchestra, held at the University of New Mexico.

In 1982, Fred Rosen was appointed CEO of Ticketmaster and moved the company to Los Angeles to be closer to the live entertainment industry. The move enabled the company to build contracts with many well-known venues including the LA Forum. Rosen drove investment into the company and led the switch to computerized ticketing. By 1985 the company had operations in the U.S., Canada and Europe. Under Rosen, the company moved into publishing and set up a travel agency and acquired rival Ticketron in 1991, making it the market leader.

In November 1993, Microsoft co-founder Paul Allen acquired an 80% stake for more than $325 million.

=== InterActiveCorp years ===
In 1998, USA Networks Inc., later named InterActiveCorp (IAC), purchased a majority stake in Ticketmaster. That same year, the company merged with CitySearch and was renamed Ticketmaster Online-CitySearch. In May 2000, Ticketmaster Online-CitySearch acquired TicketWeb Inc., a ticket vendor that sold tickets online and over the phone. In 2003, IAC repurchased the remaining Ticketmaster stock that it had previously sold off.

In September 2006, Ticketmaster President Sean Moriarty told NPR that Ticketmaster had lobbied several states to enact laws that would limit the ticket resale market to authorized companies. Economists worried these laws would harm competition, but Moriarty expressed the need to reduce corrupt scalpers and counterfeit tickets.

In January 2008, Ticketmaster acquired Paciolan Inc., a developer of ticketing system applications and hosted ticketing systems, after litigation over the potential breach of antitrust laws. Also in January, Ticketmaster acquired the UK-based secondary ticket marketplace, Getmein.com. And finally, in that same January, Ticketmaster acquired TicketsNow, a ticket reseller in the United States, for $265 million.

IAC spun off Ticketmaster as its own company in the summer of 2008. Later in 2008, Ticketmaster acquired Front Line Management, an artist management firm that worked with artists such as Aerosmith, Christina Aguilera and Jimmy Buffett. Front Line CEO Irving Azoff became CEO of the new company, which was renamed Ticketmaster Entertainment.

=== Live Nation merger ===
In February 2009, Ticketmaster entered into an agreement to merge with event promoter Live Nation to form Live Nation Entertainment. The deal was cleared by the U.S. Justice Department in January 2010 under the condition that the company sell Paciolan to Comcast Spectacor or another firm, and license its software to Anschutz Entertainment Group (AEG), its biggest competitor. The new company, which would be called Live Nation Entertainment, would also be subject to provisions for 10 years that prevented it from retaliating against venues that partnered with competing ticketing firms. When the DOJ planned to bring court proceedings against the company in 2020 for six violations to these provisions, Live Nation agreed to a settlement that extended them an additional five years to 2025. Live Nation CEO Michael Rapino was named CEO of the new company.

One year after merging, Live Nation settled a previous class action lawsuit against Ticketmaster which alleged that the company had misled plaintiffs in its descriptions of delivery and processing fees.

=== Growth and acquisitions ===
In 2015, Ticketmaster acquired Front Gate Tickets, a music festival ticketing service that provided services for festivals including Lollapalooza and Austin City Limits. The same year, the company acquired Universe, a DIY ticketing platform, and Two Toasters, a mobile app developer. In 2017, TicketWeb, Ticketmaster's self-service ticketing platform, acquired Strobe Labs, a marketing platform that allows users to market to fans through social media. In 2018, Ticketmaster acquired UPGRADED, a company which converts physical tickets into digital ones, utilising blockchain. In 2020, Ticketmaster acquired Taiwan's Tixcraft (拓元售票) for entering the Asian market.

== Products and services ==
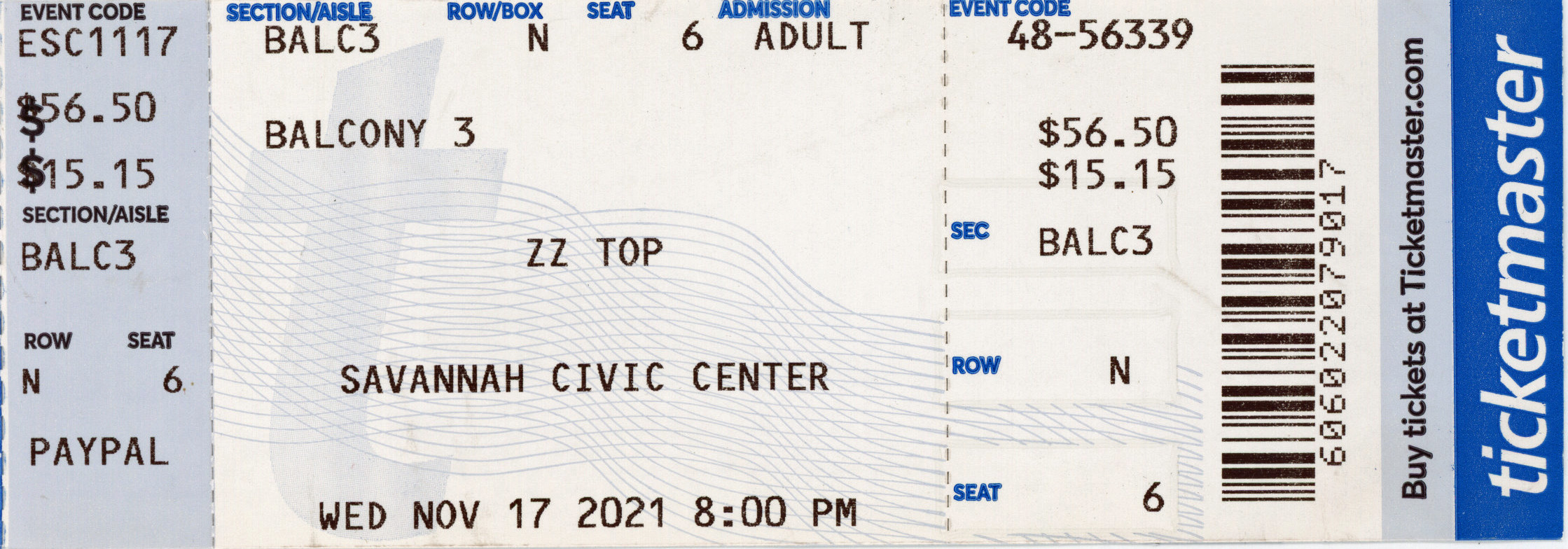
A Ticketmaster paper ticket

Ticketmaster sells tickets that its clients make available to it. In 2009, Ticketmaster released a digital ticketing system that required customers to prove their identity prior to purchase. The company believed this would help circumvent brokers and scalpers.

In 2016, Ticketmaster released a statement in favor of the Better Online Ticket Sales Act (BOTS Act), which banned the use of ticket bots to buy large amounts of tickets online and resell them at inflated prices. The following year, the company filed a lawsuit against the ticket broker Prestige Entertainment after the company used bots to buy more than 30,000 tickets to the Broadway play Hamilton.

The company reported nearly 500 million tickets sold for 400,000 events in 2018.

In November 2020, Ticketmaster announced it will check the COVID-19 vaccination status of ticket buyers before issuing passes when live events return in 2021. Fans that either failed to verify their vaccination status or tested positive would be denied access to the event.

=== Pricing ===
The face value of Ticketmaster tickets is determined by the artist or client. In addition to the face value price, venues and Ticketmaster add fees to pay for their services.

Typically, fees added to a ticket's face value have included:

- Facility charge – Charge added by the venue.
- Delivery fee – Charges added dependent on the ticket delivery method and credit card processing fees.
- Service fee – Sum of charges added based on the "agreement with each client (artists)" and the order processing fee. Ticketmaster "may earn a profit on the order processing fee".

As the Los Angeles Times has explained, "the 'service fee' is intentionally kept separate from the list price for two reasons: to make the base price of a ticket appear more affordable, and to create the impression that only Ticketmaster pockets that fee." In other words, "Ticketmaster is effectively paid to be a punching bag" for consumer frustration with opaque add-on fees, and then some of the fees find their way back to the artist or venue. Utilizing such subterfuge to extract additional revenue from fans without arousing direct backlash towards themselves has become increasingly important for artists. The collapse of record album sales after the year 2000 means that as of the 2020s, 95 percent of artist income comes from concert tours.

Fee amounts vary between events and are dependent on the venue, available delivery methods, and preferences of the artist. Some economists and activist groups have claimed that high ticket prices are due to a lack of competition within the music industry.

In 2013, the jam band The String Cheese Incident gave fans money to purchase 400 tickets to one of its shows in order to resell them on its own site with fewer fees. The band said they were protesting Ticketmaster's ticket fees, while Ticketmaster argued that the band was taking revenue from venues and promoters.

As of 2016, ticket resale was Ticketmaster's fastest growing business.

In 2022, Ticketmaster was experimenting with a demand-based, dynamic pricing which would vary the ticket price based upon demand. The new system is touted to give artists a higher share of the revenues that would otherwise be coming through resale ticket sales.

== Criticism and controversies ==
=== Anti-competition claims ===
Pearl Jam members Jeff Ament and Stone Gossard testified at a House subcommittee hearing

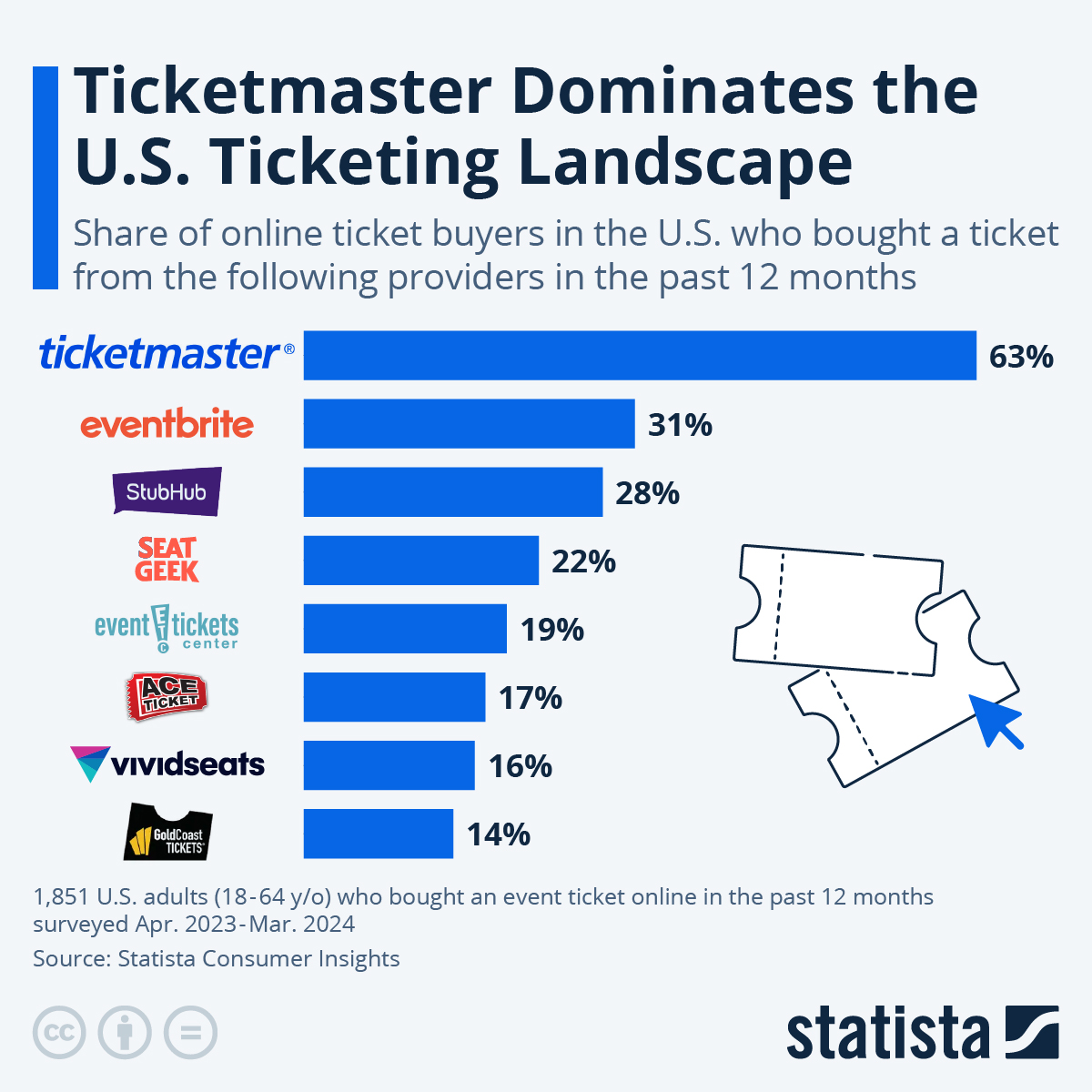
Market share of ticketing companies

In May 1994, the grunge band Pearl Jam filed a complaint with the U.S. Department of Justice claiming Ticketmaster had cut the group out of venue bookings in a dispute over fees. Two of the band's members testified before the House Governmental Operations subcommittee. The investigation was closed without action in 1995, though the Justice Department stated it would continue to monitor the developments in the ticket industry. Chuck Philips, a reporter who covered the issue, was told by sources close to the case that the investigation was closed due to a combination of a shortage of resources and the case being difficult and having uncertain prospects.

In a 2009 article by the CBC, Ticketmaster argued that legislation was needed in Ontario to protect fans from scalpers and unauthorized ticket brokers saying, "You and I both know there is a thriving ticket-broker industry... so the law is really a fiction.... We very strongly feel the law needs to be modernized to reflect the reality of internet commerce. By keeping a price cap in place, you're really just driving the [resale] business into the shadows." That same year, musician Bruce Springsteen complained of a conflict of interest between Ticketmaster and TicketsNow after fans were directed to TicketsNow once tickets to his concert sold out on Ticketmaster.com. Irving Azoff, Ticketmaster CEO at the time, released an apology and stated that the TicketsNow link would no longer be shown for Springsteen's concerts. In 2018, the United States Department of Justice began reviewing complaints by AEG that claimed the company had engaged in anti-competitive practices. As of April 2018, the Department of Justice had not released comments on its investigation.

In 2020, the Department of Justice fined Ticketmaster $3 million for violating a consent decree resulting from the Live Nation merger. The consent decree was extended through 2025 and was required to enforce its own compliance with the decree with a penalty of $1 million for any future violations.

On May 23, 2024, the DOJ and a coalition of 29 states formally launched an antitrust suit against Live Nation and Ticketmaster. The lawsuit contends that Live Nation, which owns Ticketmaster, abused its unrivaled power in the concert and ticketing industry to eliminate competition, lessening consumer choice and resulting in rising prices.

On April 15, 2026, a jury, on par with the May 2024 lawsuit which now include nearly both the U.S. Justice Department and nearly 40 states as plaintiffs, found that Live Nation Entertainment in fact was able to use an illegal monopoly to enable Ticketmaster to overcharge in ticket prices.

=== Rewards program monthly fees ===
In May 2013, Ticketmaster agreed to pay up to $23 million for enrolling customers into a rewards program that charged $9 per month. Ticketmaster made $85 million in fees, from customers who took about eight months on average to cancel their enrollment in the program. 1.12 million customers were eligible to claim up to a $30 refund.

=== Secret partnership with scalpers ===
Ticketmaster has secretly partnered with scalpers to drive up prices for consumers. Economists characterize the secondary market in tickets as socially wasteful rent-seeking. In the mid-2000s, Ticketmaster engaged in primary market auctions that reduced the rents involved in secondary market scalping – however, Ticketmaster ended these primary market auctions, opting instead to enter into the secondary market.

In September 2018, the Toronto Star reported that Ticketmaster was not enforcing ticket limit rules on its resale platform, TradeDesk. Ticketmaster denied the allegations, saying it would examine its resale policies on TradeDesk, and that it "never allows ticket scalpers to buy tickets ahead of fans." One month later, a group of customers filed a class action lawsuit against Ticketmaster.

In July 2019, a report by Billboard revealed a strategy by Live Nation, Ticketmaster's parent company, to secretly bypass placing certain tickets for sale on the primary market and instead, place them directly on resale sites "without giving fans a chance to buy them through normal channels at face value." The company acknowledged it has "facilitated the quiet transfer of concert tickets directly into the hands of resellers through the years, though only at the request of the artists involved."

In September 2025, the United States Federal Trade Commission, joined by seven states, accused Ticketmaster and Live Nation of allowing ticket resellers to ignore purchasing limit set by artists, which allowed resellers to scoop up tickets and sell them for a markup, while Ticketmaster reaped in $3.7 billion in resale fees between 2019 and 2024.

=== Data breaches ===
In June 2018, Ticketmaster notified 40,000 U.K. customers that it had identified a hack caused by malicious software on a third-party customer support product it contracted. The company stated that customers who bought tickets between February and June 2018 may have had data compromised.

Between April 2 and May 18, 2024, an "unauthorized third party obtained information from a cloud database hosted by a third-party data services provider" that exposed personal information including payment-card details. Ticketmaster identified customers whose data may have been affected by the breach on May 23, 2024, but only notified them of this a month later in a June 22 letter.

On May 20, 2024, Ticketmaster’s suffered a breach from their database hosted by Snowflake Inc. as part of a mass Snowflake customer data breach. Ticketmaster's parent company, Live Nation, revealed the breach on May 31, with Australian authorities confirming they were working with the company on the incident. Further investigation revealed that the hackers were able to access Ticketmaster's Snowflake database by using credentials stolen from EPAM, a 3rd party business process outsourcing firm.

As part of the stolen data, hackers leaked customer information and event barcodes for more than 70,000 Ticketmaster events, including Taylor Swift 'Eras Tour' and hundreds of other events.

=== Deceptive pricing ===
A class action lawsuit was filed against Ticketmaster in 2003, alleging that it did not fully disclose UPS and order processing fees added to tickets sold online. The case settlement was approved in 2015 and Ticketmaster issued vouchers and discount codes to fans who purchased tickets online between 1999 and 2013. In a related case, Ticketmaster filed suit against its liability insurance carrier, Illinois Union Insurance Company, a subsidiary of ACE Limited, in 2010 for failing to aid in its defense in the 2003 suit.

In June 2019, Canada's Competition Bureau fined Ticketmaster $4.5 million dollars ($3.44 million US dollars) as part of a settlement after it was discovered that Ticketmaster "topped advertised costs by more than 20%—and sometimes as much as 65%." In addition to the required payment, Ticketmaster signed a consent agreement to ensure its advertising policies abide by Canadian law.

=== Competitor computer hacking ===
In December 2020, Ticketmaster "entered into a plea agreement with federal prosecutors" and agreed to pay a $10 million fine after being charged with illegally accessing computer systems of a competitor. According to FBI Assistant Director-in-Charge Williams Sweeney, "Ticketmaster used stolen information to gain an advantage over its competition, and then promoted the employees who broke the law." The allegations were first reported in 2017 when a former CrowdSurge top executive hired by Ticketmaster hacked into his former employer's database.

=== Dynamic pricing and "platinum" tickets ===
Ticketmaster and Live Nation has faced backlash for their dynamic pricing system and "platinum" tickets when tickets for Bruce Springsteen's and Blink-182's 2023 tours went on sale in July and October 2022 respectively, which saw fans of both acts criticize prices for random seats across the venue going for hundreds or thousands of dollars during pre-sales or right when tickets went on sale for the general public. In March 2023, Robert Smith criticized the model and announced that the Cure would not be allowing Ticketmaster to sell dynamically-priced or platinum tickets for the band's upcoming North American tour. Smith priced tickets for the Cure's concerts for as low as $20, but Ticketmaster charged fees that equalled more than the price of the base ticket. After Smith expressed his outrage, Ticketmaster refunded a portion of the fees to the purchasers.

=== Taylor Swift tour pre-sale crash ===
On November 15, 2022, the first day of pre-sale of tickets to verified fans for the US leg of the Eras Tour (2023) by American singer-songwriter Taylor Swift, Ticketmaster's official website crashed following "historically unprecedented demand with millions showing up", halting the pre-sale. In less than an hour of availability, the ticketing platform's servers were "unable to answer", with users "either completely logged out or in a queue 2,000-plus people strong that appeared frozen." Ticketmaster immediately published a statement saying they are working to fix the issues "as the site was unprepared to accommodate the sheer force of hundreds of thousands of Swift fans", and subsequently reported that "hundreds of thousands of tickets" had already been sold and rescheduled the remaining onsales to a different time, including the Capital One onsale to November 16.

Fans and customers online widely criticized Ticketmaster for a flawed ticketing model that obstructed them from purchasing tickets. The word "Ticketmaster" was trending number one worldwide on various social media platforms such as Twitter and TikTok. Several US lawmakers took notice of the issue. US congresswoman Alexandria Ocasio-Cortez tweeted that Ticketmaster is a monopoly and that it must be unmerged from Live Nation Entertainment. Congressman Bill Pascrell, who had previously petitioned US Attorney General Merrick Garland in support of "strong antitrust enforcement by the Biden Administration" and criticized the merger of Ticketmaster and Live Nation, stated that he attempted to purchase tickets but was placed on the waitlist. The Tennessee Attorney General, Jonathan Skrmetti, began an investigation into "consumer complaints about chaos during the presale of tickets" to the tour. He said in a press conference on November 16 that "a lack of competition [for Ticketmaster] has led to a poor experience and higher prices for consumers." Following investigations initiated by the Tennessee Attorney General and the North Carolina Attorney General on the grounds of consumer rights violations, the federal Department of Justice began an investigation into Live Nation Entertainment and Ticketmaster on November 18.

Swift released a statement on November 18, 2022, via her Instagram story; she asserted that she is protective of her fans and wanted to assure a quality experience for them, but found it difficult to "trust an outside entity with these relationships and loyalties". She said that she was "not going to make excuses for anyone because we asked [Ticketmaster], multiple times, if they could handle this kind of demand and we were assured they could." She concluded that she is taking the necessary measures to resolve the issue and resume the sale.

In December, a group of Swift's fans, called "Swifties," filed a lawsuit against Ticketmaster and its parent company Live Nation, accusing them of fraud, anti-trust violations, and price-fixing. In the lawsuit, fans demanded $2,500 for each violation, which could potentially amount to several million in total.

=== Cloned and invalid Bad Bunny concert tickets ===
On December 9, 2022, the day of Bad Bunny's first concert of his World's Hottest Tour in Mexico City, an unprecedented number of tickets were cancelled, affecting a considerable group of concertgoers, whose tickets were confiscated and destroyed. Because of this, Ticketmaster received a great amount of criticism because many of the attendees who were denied entry were accused of having counterfeit or cloned tickets, even though those attendees presented proof of payment or their ticket had not even been previously scanned. The procurator of Office of the Federal Prosecutor for the Consumer, described on Twitter that the agency had already requested a report from Ticketmaster Mexico on what happened at the Estadio Azteca and asked affected consumers to formalize their complaints under the terms of the law. Due to the criticism, Ticketmaster Mexico released a statement through their social networks apologizing and saying that "the inconveniences in the accesses were a consequence of the presentation of an unprecedented number of fake tickets, which caused an out of the ordinary agglomeration of people and an intermittent operation of our system". They also offered refunds for the full cost of the tickets. However, PROFECO ordered that those affected not only be refunded the full cost of the ticket, but an additional 20%.

=== United States Senate committee hearing ===
On January 24, 2023, a three-hour hearing by the Senate judiciary committee, titled "That's the Ticket: Promoting Competition and Protecting Consumers in Live Entertainment", to analyze "the long-simmering dissatisfaction over the 2010 consent decree governing the merger of Ticketmaster and Live Nation", was held at 10:00 am EST in the Hart Senate Office Building, Washington, D.C. The hearing was telecast live. Various media outlets reported that both the Democrat and Republican senators "grilled" Ticketmaster's representative, Joe Berchtold, the company's chief financial officer. The senators questioned Berchtold over Ticketmaster's monopolistic practices, policies, ticket costs, lack of transparency, lack of defense against bots, and insensitivity to music artists. Berchtold, despite apologizing for the debacle, denied accusations of monopoly and fraud, but accepted that "there are several things we could have done better—including staggering the sales over a longer period of time and doing a better job setting fan expectations for getting tickets" and continued to blame "industrial-scale ticket scalping" and "unprecedented number of bots" in Swift's tour debacle. The witnesses prosecuting Ticketmaster included Jerry Mickelson, the president of JAM Creative Productions; and Jack Groetzinger, co-founder of SeatGeek. Live Nation cited several letters of support within its testimony, including one from American country singer Garth Brooks. Free Britney America, a D.C. organization that was part of the Free Britney movement, protested outside the U.S. Capitol during the hearing "in support of ending Ticketmaster-Live Nation's monopoly over the live event and ticketing industry."

=== Zach Bryan scalpers and Drake tour misinformation ===
On December 26, 2022, American country singer Zach Bryan criticized Ticketmaster for his Burn Burn Burn tour (2023) and listed out non-transferrable tickets to stop scalpers. He went on to release a live album, entitled All My Homies Hate Ticketmaster.

In March 2023, fans of Canadian rapper Drake also filed a class action lawsuit against Ticketmaster in the Superior Court of Quebec, alleging intentional deception and fraud. Plaintiffs claimed that the on-sale for the It's All a Blur Tour, a co-headlining concert tour by Drake and 21 Savage, "intentionally misleads consumers for [Ticketmaster's] own financial gain" by concealing information about additional show dates to drive demand and ticket prices. The suit seeks $300 in punitive damages per customer and compensatory damages covering the difference between the "Official Platinum" ticket prices and the regular cost for the seats.

=== Eurovision 2023 on-sale crash ===
For the Eurovision Song Contest 2023 in Liverpool in May 2023, the European Broadcasting Union (EBU) and the host broadcaster BBC partnered with Ticketmaster. Prior to the ticket booking platform going live, many users complained that the Ticketmaster website had crashed with a 500 error. Tickets for the contest's final sold out in 36 minutes, with the remaining available shows selling out around an hour later. Following this, tickets were available on third-party resale platforms such as Viagogo, with a general admission standing ticket for the final, originally priced at £380, being sold for up to £11,800.

=== Coronation concert ballot misinformation ===
Ticketmaster was heavily criticised for their handling of the tickets for Coronation Concert of Charles III and Camilla. After two rounds of ticket balloting for guaranteed tickets, remaining unclaimed tickets were released on a first-come, first-served basis to those who had previously applied to the ballot. Despite tickets being fully claimed, thousands of emails were sent to those unsuccessful in the ballot incorrectly informing them that they won tickets. As a result, many people rushed to book travel, accommodation and time off work for the event. Ticketmaster was criticised and the email was labeled "misleading".

=== Oasis dynamic pricing scrutiny ===
Many fans criticised the sales process and prices for the Oasis 2025 reunion tour, noting hours-long queues or website crashes when attempting to buy tickets: other fans reported being placed in a queue for the ticket queue. If fans were able to reach the purchase section of the website, tickets would dramatically change in price, with reports indicating rises from £135, to more than £350. It was confirmed ticket prices, and the sudden increase, was due to Ticketmaster's dynamic pricing system. According to Jonathan Brown, chief executive of the Society of Ticket Agents and Retailers, the band itself holds the power to opt-in to dynamic pricing. Oasis responded to this in statement, saying, "[we] leave decisions on ticketing and pricing entirely to their promoters and management" and that they had "at no time had any awareness that dynamic pricing was going to be used". However, in 2023, Robert Smith of the Cure confirmed dynamic pricing used by Ticketmaster is something artists can choose to opt into.

On 5 September 2024, the UK Competition and Markets Authority (CMA) announced it was launching an investigation into Ticketmaster over Oasis concert ticket sales. The CMA said its investigation would include how dynamic pricing may have been used and would scrutinise whether the sale of tickets may have breached consumer protection law. This included considering whether Ticketmaster had engaged in unfair commercial practices, if consumers were given clear and timely information to explain that the tickets could be subject to dynamic pricing, and if consumers were put under pressure to buy tickets within a short period of time – at a higher price than they understood they would have to pay.

=== Ticket transfer hacking ===
In fall 2024, Ticketmaster customers began noticing tickets were being incorrectly removed from accounts. Despite thousands of customers taking to Ticketmaster's social media accounts over a period of months, the platform initially ignored the comments and released a statement in October 2024 indicating that affected customers were "victims of hackers" taking advantage of the platform's ticket transfer feature. Despite this, Ticketmaster did not replace missing tickets or pull its ticket transfer feature pending an investigation into the hacking. This issue continued in November 2024 for fans attending an Usher concert, with the tickets only being refunded after fans complained to the Better Business Bureau. Due to Ticketmaster's lack of information and action, social media users and fans questioned if the organization was in on the scam itself.

=== Service fees class action in Quebec ===
In January 2026, a Canadian class action lawsuit was certified by the Superior Court of Quebec, alleging that its service fees were abusive and violated the province's Consumer Protection Act and its Civil Code because they varied based on the price of the underlying ticket instead of the actual cost spent providing the service.

== Partners ==
Ticketmaster has partnerships with venues, professional sports leagues and teams, college and universities, musical acts and theatre tours and target corporation in the United States and internationally. Ticketmaster has partnered with musical acts such as Taylor Swift, and the Trans-Siberian Orchestra, and theatre productions such as Hamilton and Harry Potter and the Cursed Child.

Ticketmaster has been the ticketing provider for the National Football League (NFL), National Hockey League (NHL) and the National Basketball Association (NBA). In 2008, Ticketmaster entered into an agreement with the National Football League (NFL) to manage its resale market on NFL TicketExchange. Ticketmaster also works with wrestling promotions World Wrestling Entertainment (WWE) (1994) and All Elite Wrestling (AEW) (2019)

In 2017, Ticketmaster announced it would open the TicketExchange platform to allow the sale and validation of tickets on third-party websites, including StubHub. Ticketmaster has also partnered with the United States Tennis Association, Tennis Canada, and the PGA Tour.

== See also ==
- Live Nation Entertainment
- Jerry Seltzer
- Ticket resale
- Ticketmaster Corp. v. Tickets.com, Inc.
- Monopoly
