= Ticket resale =

Act of reselling tickets for admission to events

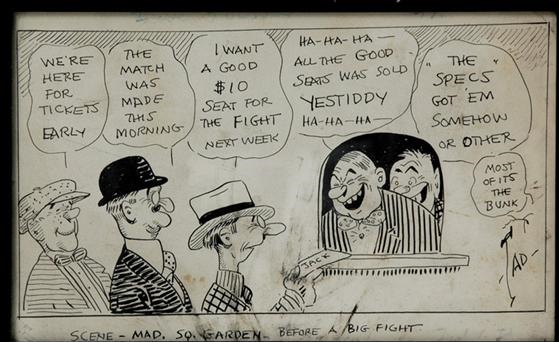
In this 1920s cartoon by Tad Dorgan, people wishing to attend a boxing match are told that all the good tickets were sold (to "specs" — that is, speculators) yesterday, even though the match was only announced that morning.

Ticket resale, known in North American English as ticket scalping and in British English as ticket touting when done for profit, is the act of reselling tickets for admission to events. Tickets are bought from licensed sellers and then sold for a price determined by the individual or company in possession of the tickets. Tickets sold through secondary sources may be sold for less or more than their face value depending on demand, which tends to vary as the event date approaches. When the supply of tickets for a given event available through authorized ticket sellers is depleted, the event is considered "sold out," generally increasing the market value for any tickets on offer through secondary sellers. Ticket resale is common in both sporting and musical events.

Ticket resale is a form of arbitrage that arises when the number demanded at the sale price exceeds the number supplied–that is, when event organizers charge less than the equilibrium prices for the tickets. During the 19th century, the term scalper was applied to railroad ticket brokers who sold tickets for lower rates.

== Purchase and resale methods ==
Ticket resellers use several different means to secure premium and previously sold-out ticket inventories (potentially in large quantities) for events such as concerts or sporting events. Established resellers may operate within networks of ticket contacts, including season ticket holders, individual ticket resellers, and ticket brokers. They make a business out of securing hard-to-find and previously sold-out tickets that are no longer available through the official box office.

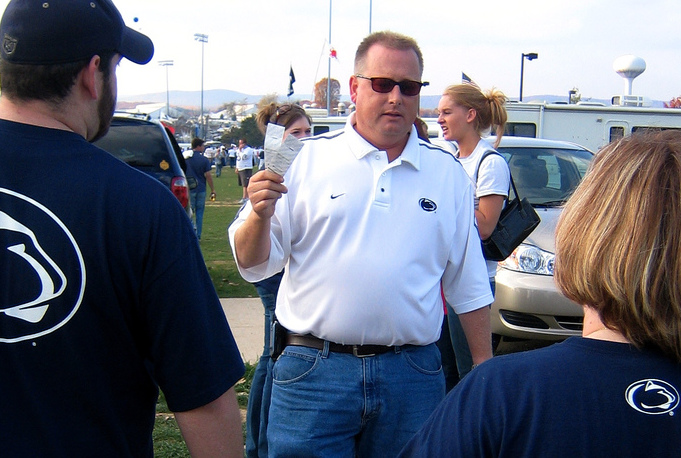
A ticket scalper selling tickets for a Penn State football game

Ticket scalpers work outside events, often showing up with unsold tickets from brokers' offices on a consignment basis or showing up without tickets and buying extra tickets from fans at or below face value on a speculative basis hoping to resell them at a profit. There are many full-time scalpers who are regulars at particular venues and may even have a pool of loyal buyers.

One common concern with resale is with scam artists selling fake tickets to unsuspecting buyers. Another common scalping practice is to sell tickets that have already been scanned at the venue gate. Entry is typically allowed only when a ticket is scanned for the first time, but unsuspecting buyers may purchase an authentic but unusable ticket that has already been scanned.

A concern when buying tickets on the street from a ticket scalper or via an online auction is that the tickets sold by ticket resellers may themselves be stolen or counterfeit. For many major sporting events, counterfeit tickets are auctioned off in the months leading up to the event. Criminals selling stolen or counterfeit tickets are not to be confused with legitimate ticket brokers and individuals who abide by the law to legally resell tickets on the secondary market.

In 2009, Ticketmaster started adoption of a "paperless" restricted ticketing in which tickets could not be resold. Under the system, customers prove their purchase by showing a credit card and ID. The measure was taken in response to ticket scalping and resale markup of tickets on secondary markets and adopted during Miley Cyrus' Wonder World Tour, although Ticketmaster first experimented it with AC/DC's Black Ice World Tour (2008–10). Ticketmaster has since changed the name of the system to "Credit Card Entry". The system requires large groups to enter together with the person who purchased tickets. Some events have Ticket Transfer which allows the tickets to change ownership and allow for tickets to be transferred through Ticketmaster's proprietary systems. These cannot be later resold or transferred via ticket exchanges such as StubHub.

=== Ticket presales ===
Obtaining tickets through presales has become increasingly common. These presales often use unique codes specific to an artist's fan club or venue. The advent of presales has allowed more individuals to participate in reselling tickets outside of a brokers office. Some ticket brokers offer tickets even before the tickets are officially available for sale. In such scenarios, those ticket resellers are actually selling forward contracts of those tickets. This is often possible if the reseller is a season ticket holder. Season ticket holders generally receive the same exact seat locations year after year thus they can enter a contract to deliver on tickets that they own the rights to, even if those tickets have not even been printed or sent to the original ticket holder.

=== Automated scalping bots ===
In recent years, more complex methods have been deployed to obtain tickets for resale on the secondary market. Similar to the technology used to snatch up rare shoes and sneakers, automated bot attacks have become a common way to acquire large numbers of tickets only to resell them for higher profits. Scalpers will deploy thousands of bots from untraceable IP addresses in a brute force attack as soon as a venue or ticket seller first makes them available for sale. In 2017, one of the largest online ticket sellers Ticketmaster filed a lawsuit against Prestige Entertainment for their continued use of scalper bots despite paying $3.35 million to the New York Attorney General's Office just a year prior. Ticketmaster claimed that Prestige Entertainment was able to lock up 40% of available tickets for performances of the hit Broadway musical Hamilton, as well as a majority of the tickets Ticketmaster had available for the Floyd Mayweather and Manny Pacquiao fight in Las Vegas in 2015. In an effort to curtail such behavior, Congress moved to pass the Better Online Tickets Sales Act of 2016, more commonly referred to as the BOTS Act. The legislation was signed into law in December 2016 by President Barack Obama. The BOTS Act enforces several penalties and fines for parties found guilty of using bots or other technology for undermining online ticket seller systems with the hopes of selling them on the secondary ticket market.

=== Ticket brokering ===
Ticket brokers operate out of offices and use the internet and phone call centers to conduct their business. They are different from scalpers since they offer a consumer-facing storefront to return to if there is any problem with their transaction. The majority of transactions that occur are via credit card over the phone or internet. Some brokers host their own websites and interact directly with customers. These brokers are able to offer additional services such as hotel accommodation and airfare to events. Other brokers partner with online ticket exchanges. These sites act as marketplaces that allow users to purchase tickets from a large network of brokers. Some brokers offer advice on the best way to buy tickets starting with the box office and working with a broker if tickets are unavailable through the box office.

Online ticket brokering is the resale of tickets through a web-based ticket brokering service. Prices on ticket brokering websites are determined by demand, availability, and the ticket reseller. Tickets sold through an online ticket brokering service may or may not be authorized by the official seller. Generally, the majority of trading on ticket brokering websites concerns itself with tickets to live entertainment events whereby the primary officially licensed seller's supply has been exhausted and the event has been declared sold out." Critics of the industry compare the resale of tickets online to "ticket touting", "scalping", or a variety of other terms for the unofficial sale of tickets directly outside the venue of an event. The late 1990s and early 2000s saw the emergence of online ticket brokering as a lucrative business. The American corporate ticket reselling firm Ticketmaster developed a strong online presence and made several acquisitions to compete in the secondary markets. Securities analyst Joe Bonner, who tracks Ticketmaster's parent company New York-based IAC/InterActiveCorp, told USA Today: "You have to look at the secondary market as something that is a real threat to Ticketmaster. They missed the boat. StubHub has been around a few years now already. They weren't as proactive as they probably should have been." Ticketmaster launched fan to fan secondary ticket reselling site TicketExchange in November 2005. Ticketmaster acquired former rivals GetMeIn and TicketsNow, while eBay bought StubHub. In 2008, the Boston Red Sox chose Ace Ticket over StubHub to sell their tickets. There are also independently owned online ticket resellers such as SeatMarket. The growth of the ticket resale market has been consistently growing and is expected to expand even further.

== Criticism ==
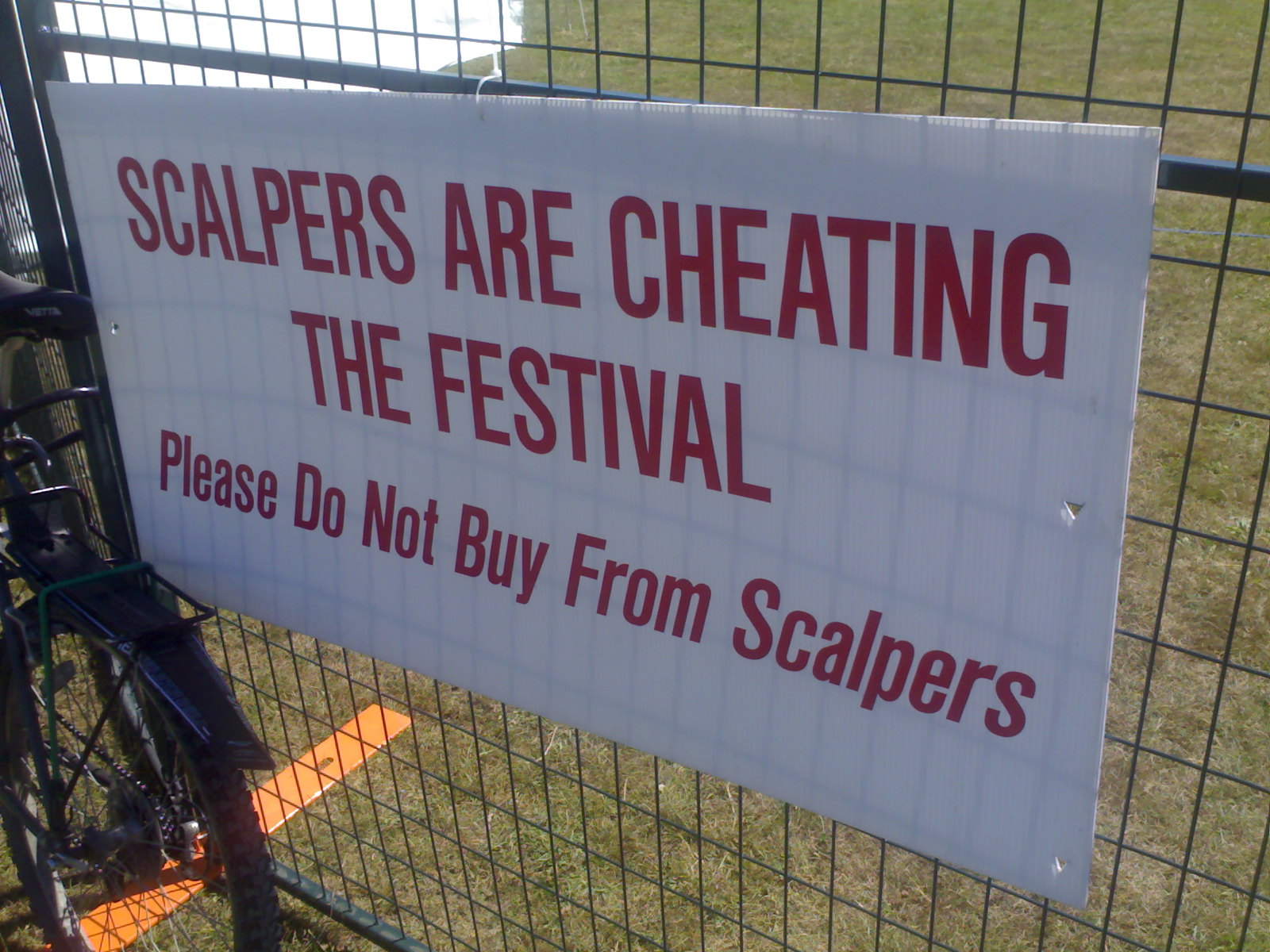
Many event promoters actively discourage ticket scalping, as seen by this sign at the Vancouver Folk Music Festival.

For popular events with soldout tickets, resellers may sell the tickets at several times the face value. If resellers buy the tickets and the tickets are not sold out, they risk a loss. There may be individuals who wish to attend a popular event (and decide to sell their tickets later) and those that buy tickets in large quantities in order to resell their tickets for a profit. Some countries have restricted the unauthorized resale of tickets. According to Stephen Barrett of Quackwatch, many online ticket resellers use URLs that are similar to official box-office websites and sometimes imply via their texts or their pictures that they are official, use internet advertising to increase traffic to their website, and avoid clearly stating the real prices that are charged for a ticket.

== International responses ==
It is controversial whether tickets are goods which can be privately resold. Typically, private resale will contravene the original conditions of sale, but it is legally questionable whether the original conditions of sale are even enforceable; however, most venues declare that they have the right to refuse entry to anyone.

=== Australia ===
Depending on the ticketing body's conditions of sale, tickets may be voided if they are resold for a profit. That is so with tickets bought from Ticketek, an Australian-based ticketing company. Efforts to clamp down on ticket resale have included labeling tickets with the name or a photograph of the buyer and banning people without tickets from the vicinity of the event to prevent the purchase of secondary market tickets. In Australia, the secondary ticket market has been put under much scrutiny in the past few years as ticket scalpers dominated the resale ticket market. Scalpers would purchase tickets in bulk from the promoter hoping that the tickets would sell out causing an increase in demand for tickets and thus an increase in the ticket price. This caused event promoters to put restrictions on the number of tickets that can be purchased in one transaction, which has greatly reduced unfair ticket pricing. After many complaints from the community and event promoters, the Commonwealth Consumer Affairs Advisory Council and NSW Fair Trading conducted a survey discussing scalping issues and released The Ticket Scalping Issue Paper for NSW.

In Victoria, New South Wales, South Australia and Western Australia, the reselling of tickets for more than 10% above its face value is banned; in the latter three states, the use of bots to purchase tickets is also banned. In recent efforts to combat illegal ticket scalping and enforce resale laws, Australia has seen the emergence of responsible ticket resale companies employing advanced technologies. Australian regulations stipulate that ticket resellers must conspicuously display key information to potential buyers. This includes a clear statement indicating that the service being used is a ticket resale platform, thereby not directly affiliated with primary ticket providers. Additionally, it is imperative that these platforms provide a comprehensive breakdown of the ticket's cost, comparing the original selling price to the resale price, hence offering transparency about the markup. This total cost can be determined through various means such as the price indicated on the ticket.

=== Canada ===
Quebec put into law Bill 25 in June 2012, making it illegal for ticket brokers to resell a ticket for more than the face value of the ticket without first obtaining permission from the ticket's original vendor. Brokers reselling tickets are required to inform consumers the tickets are being resold and must tell consumers the name of the ticket's original vendor and the original face value price. The penalty to violating the law includes fines of $1,000 to $2,000 for the first offense, and as much as $200,000 for repeated violations.

In Ontario, reselling the tickets above face value is prohibited by the Ticket Speculation Act and is punishable by a fine of $5,000 for an individual (including those buying the tickets above face) or $50,000 for a corporation. Effective July 1, 2015, in an effort to protect consumers from purchasing fraudulent tickets, Ontario created an exemption under the Ticket Speculation Act to:

- Enable official ticket sellers to authenticate tickets that are being resold
- Permit tickets to be resold above face value in circumstances where tickets are authenticated or have a money-back guarantee
- Allow tickets to be resold at a price that includes any service fees paid when the ticket was first purchased.

Following an announcement in 2016 that The Tragically Hip's lead singer Gord Downie had been diagnosed with terminal brain cancer, the band held the Man Machine Poem Tour. Ticket resellers reportedly purchased two thirds of all available tickets to capitalize on public demand. As a result, in 2017, Ontario announced legislation to attempt to crack down on scalper bots.

=== Ireland ===
In the Republic of Ireland, there are no laws against ticket touting, and it is common at online outlets such as Premiertickets.ie or Needaticket.ie. In 2011, the Minister for Jobs, Enterprise and Innovation, Richard Bruton, declined to pass a law against touting and said that would just drive resellers to websites based abroad. Ticketmaster, Ireland's main ticket seller, runs a service called Seatwave which resells tickets, some at wildly inflated prices. However, selling tickets in a public place (e.g. outside a venue) is illegal under the Casual Trading Act, 1995 — in 2015 Kazimierz Greń, an official of the Polish Football Association, spent the night in a cell after being arrested for selling tickets outside an Ireland–Poland football match.

=== Israel ===
In Israel, the Knesset put into effect in 2002 the 67th Amendment to the Israeli Penal Code, enacting Section 194a, which outlaws ticket scalping. The new section states that unlicensed persons reselling tickets at above face value will be subject to fines. The new addition to the penal code enabled police to fight the ticket scalping of sports and music events, especially the scalpers who bought massive numbers of tickets for the sole purpose of resale and were causing much distress to the public and enabled scalpers to evade paying taxes. Since no law had cleary outlawed the practice, it could not be legally fought prior to the new law.

=== Philippines ===
There is no national law regulating ticket resale in the Philippines. However there are local ordinances in Quezon City and Pasig which penalize exploitative scalping.

=== Sweden ===
Ticket resale by scalpers above face value is legal in Sweden regardless of limitations that are imposed by event organizers.

=== United Kingdom ===
In the United Kingdom, the resale of football tickets is illegal under section 166 of the Criminal Justice and Public Order Act 1994 unless the resale is authorized by the organizer of the match. The secondary ticketing market StubHub signed partnership agreements with Sunderland and Everton for 2012/13 season, and the competitor Viagogo hold partnerships with Chelsea and other clubs. In July 2016, several prominent music managers in the UK including Ian McAndrew, Harry Magee, Brian Message and Adam Tudhope came together to fund a new initiative called the FanFair Alliance, to work towards tackling the issue of "industrial-scale online ticket touting". The Labour Party's 2024 election manifesto promised to introduce new consumer protections on ticket resales. In 2025, after musicians called on Keir Starmer to prevent ticket touting, the government introduced a plan to ban reselling tickets for live events above original cost.

=== United States ===
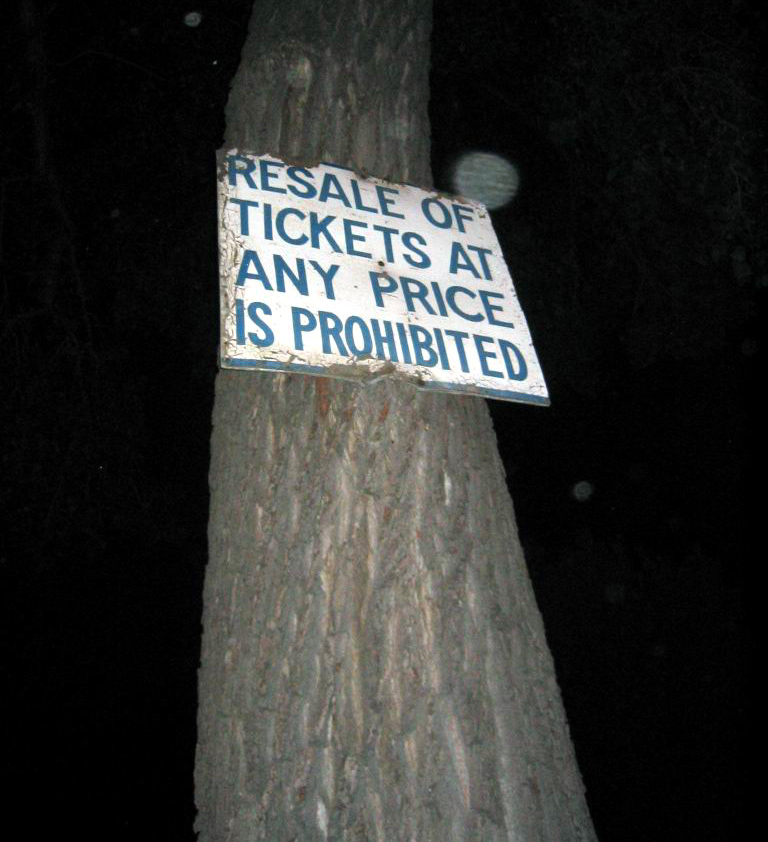
A sign prohibiting tickets sales at any price

In the United States, ticket resale is a $5 billion industry. Ticket resale on the premises of the event (including adjacent parking lots that are officially part of the facility) may be prohibited by law. The laws vary from state to state but the majority of US states do not have laws in place to limit the value placed on the resale amount of event tickets or where and how these tickets should be sold. Ticket resellers may conduct business on nearby sidewalks or advertise through newspaper ads or ticket brokers. New York State law permits prices above face value only by the greater of $5 or 10%.

Some U.S states and venues encourage a designated area for resellers to stand in, on, or near the premises, and other states and venues prohibit ticket resale altogether. Resale laws, policies, and practices are generally decided, practiced and governed at the local or even venue level in the US and such laws and or interpretations are not currently generalized at a national level. However in 2025, President Donald Trump issued an executive order directing the Federal Trade Commission to crack down on "exploitative ticket scalping". In August 2025, the FTC sued the ticket reseller Key Investment Group, accusing the company of violating the Better Online Tickets Sales Act and the Federal Trade Commission Act of 1914 by using fake or purchased Ticketmaster accounts to evade purchasing limits, then resell the tickets for a markup. Another issue in the U.S is that since ticketing laws vary by state, many ticket resellers use a loophole and sell their tickets outside of the state of an event.

== Countermeasures ==
=== Selling tickets by ballot ===
Some promoters have ceased selling tickets in the traditional first-come-first-served manner and require prospective ticket holders to enter a "ballot," a competition with random winners, with the prize being the opportunity to purchase a small number of tickets. The ballots are intended to discourage reselling by making it more difficult to purchase large numbers of tickets because being at the front of the queue does not guarantee the holder a ticket. Events that have sold tickets by ballot include the Big Day Out in 2007, the Ahmet Ertegün Tribute Concert – Led Zeppelin reunion concert at The O_{2} Arena in 2007, and the 2006 Commonwealth Games.

A similar practice used among ticket resellers is to list an item as an online auction (such as eBay), most commonly an innocuous item such as a collector's card, and give the tickets as a bonus to the winning bidder and so they do not actually sell tickets to circumvent ticket laws. That does not actually get around eBay's selling rules, which effectively state that the goods that the buyer receives are the ones that are sold by the seller, including any free bonuses.

=== Selling tickets at auction ===
Ticketmaster sells tickets in online auctions, which may bring the sale price of tickets closer to market prices. The New York Times reported that could help the agency determine demand for a given event and more effectively compete with ticket resellers. Online auction sites like eBay enforce state ticketing laws only if either the buyer and/or the seller resides in the state in which the event takes place. Otherwise, there is no resale limit for tickets.

=== Personalized tickets and other responses ===
Glastonbury Festival, which sold out 137,500 tickets within less than two hours in 2007, introduced a system in the same year whereby tickets included photographic ID of the original buyer to enforce non-exchangeability. For taping of Comedy Central's The Daily Show and The Colbert Report, tickets were free. However, identification of ticket holders is checked when entering and while standing in line and most notably when progressing from the entrance queue into the studio space. Those measures serve effectively as a means of preventing those reserving the sought-after tickets from selling them for a cash value upon reservation. Some ticket sellers allow buyers to provide personal information in exchange for being allowed to buy tickets earlier.

== Other uses ==
Though scalping is most commonly associated with ticket sales, the process of buying desirable commodities and selling them off for a higher rate has proven lucrative with other items, particularly electronic devices such as mobile phones, video game consoles, and computer hardware. In some cases, internet resellers have developed automated bots to purchase bulk quantities of newly-released items on e-commerce websites as soon as they become available. Customers have argued that generates an unfair advantage for the scalpers and adds to an already-controversial practice, and many sites have begun implementing anti-bot measures to combat such tactics.

== See also ==
- Experience good
- Internet ticket fraud
- Price discrimination
- Ticket exchange
