= New Brandeis movement =

American academic and political movement

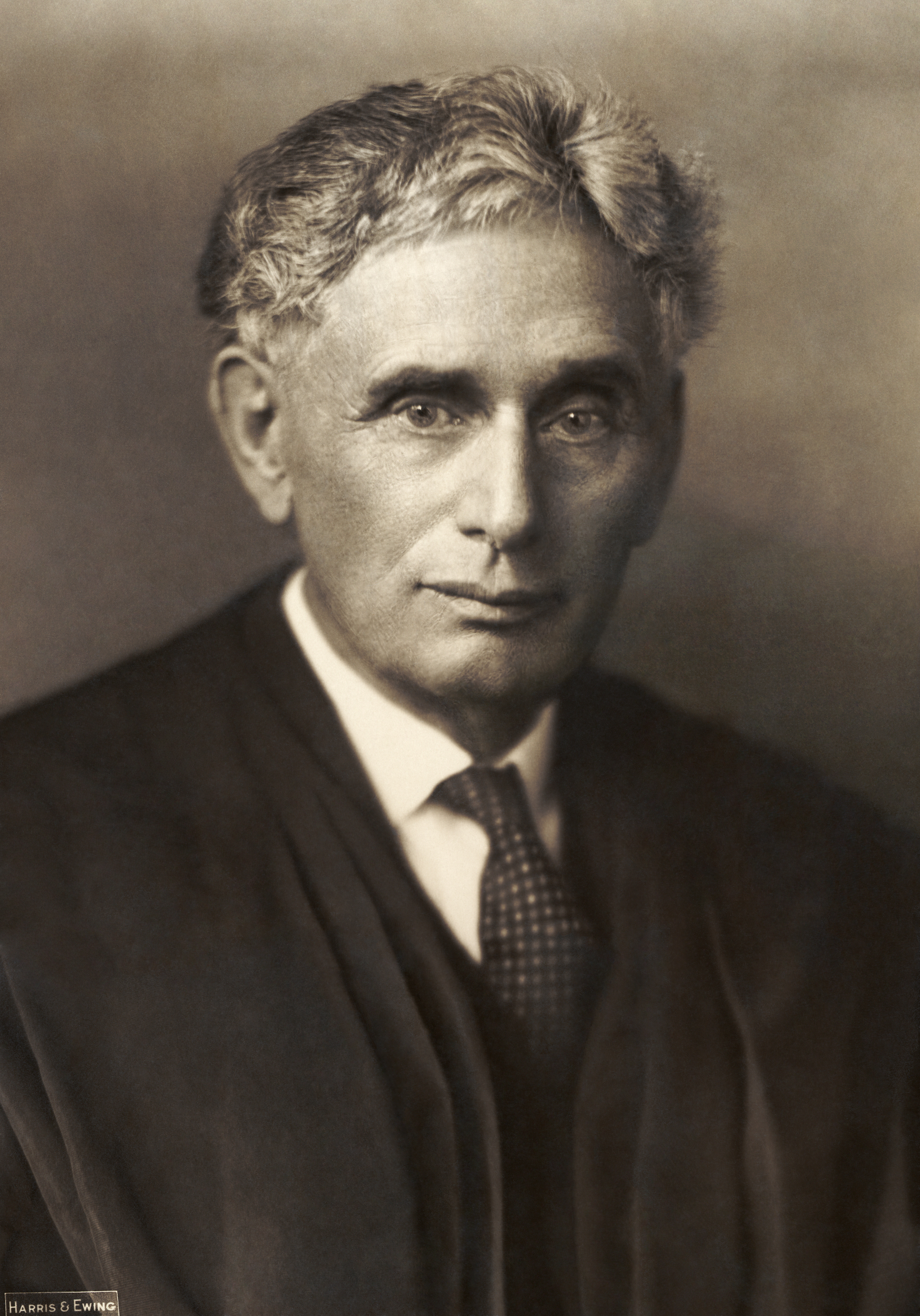
Louis Brandeis (1856–1941)

The New Brandeis movement (also known as the neo-Brandeis movement) is an ongoing antitrust academic and political movement in the United States which argues that excessively centralized private power is dangerous for economic, political and social reasons. The movement advocates that United States antitrust law return to a broader concern with private power and its negative effects on market competition, income inequality, consumer rights, unemployment, and wage growth.

The movement draws inspiration from the anti-monopolist work of Louis Brandeis, an early 20th century United States Supreme Court Justice who called high economic concentration “the Curse of Bigness” and believed monopolies were inherently harmful to the welfare of workers and business innovation.

The New Brandeis movement opposes the school of thought in modern antitrust law that antitrust should center on consumer welfare (as generally advocated by the Chicago school of economics). Instead, the New Brandeis movement advocates a broader antimonopoly approach that is concerned with private power, the structure of the economy, and market conditions necessary to promote competition.

== Intellectual origins ==
=== Louis Brandeis and the "Curse of Bigness" ===
The New Brandeis movement draws its name and main ideas from the legal and political work of early 20th-century figure Louis Brandeis. During the Gilded Age and Progressive Era, the American economy underwent a period of corporate consolidation, finding itself at the intersection of industrial trusts and financial monopolies led by figures like J. P. Morgan and John D. Rockefeller. In describing the shift from an agrarian economy to one dominated by large corporations, historians note that the sheer scale of these entities caused public concern about the future of democratic institutions.

Brandeis emerged as a prominent critic of this consolidation. In his 1914 book Other People's Money and How the Bankers Use It, he introduced the concept of the "Curse of Bigness". In the text, Brandeis frames centralized private power as a political and moral threat, rather than just an economic one. In describing the actions of financial oligarchies, he argues that they monopolized credit and controlled different industries. These practices—which he believed destroyed industrial liberty and stifled innovation—were seen by Brandeis as creating a political power that rivaled the state itself. Because he viewed a democratic republic as dependent on a decentralized economy, Brandeis advocated for a system of small and medium-sized producers. He also argued that monopolies were inefficient because of bureaucratic bloat and a lack of competitive discipline.

=== Structuralism and the mid-century consensus ===
During the New Deal, following the Great Depression, the federal government increased anti-monopoly efforts. Historian Ellis Hawley described this period as the first "neo-Brandeisian" movement. Figures such as Felix Frankfurter and Antitrust Division head Thurman Arnold led a return to structuralist antitrust enforcement. This approach, often called the "Harvard School" of economics, proposed that highly concentrated market structures led to anti-competitive conduct and poor economic performance.

For several decades, courts and federal agencies blocked mergers and broke up monopolies to maintain fragmented markets. Historian Richard Hofstadter noted that by the mid-20th century, the antitrust movement lost its populist support. It changed from a political movement into a technical and bureaucratic process managed by legal and economic specialists. This left the movement's political philosophy open to changes in academic trends.

=== The Chicago School and the Consumer Welfare Standard ===
In the late 1970s and 1980s, the Chicago School of antitrust analysis replaced the Brandeisian approach. Scholars like Robert Bork, Aaron Director, and Richard Posner argued that the structuralist methods punished efficient companies and protected inefficient competitors at the public's expense.

Bork outlined this view in his 1978 book The Antitrust Paradox. He argued that the legislative history of the Sherman Act showed Congress had one goal: maximizing "consumer welfare". Bork defined "competition" as a state that maximizes economic efficiency and lowers consumer prices. He rejected the Brandeisian idea that antitrust law should serve social or political purposes, such as dispersing power or protecting local businesses. The Chicago School argued that if a merger or practice did not raise prices or restrict output, it should be legal, as it likely indicated business efficiency.

Heterodox scholars have analyzed the Chicago School's price-theory framework from a political economy perspective. They describe it as an ideological superstructure that justified late 20th-century economic conditions, including deregulation, capital consolidation, and globalization. By the early 2000s, the federal judiciary and the Department of Justice had adopted Bork's "Consumer Welfare Standard". The government narrowed antitrust enforcement, brought fewer monopolization cases, and removed political considerations of corporate concentration from jurisprudence. The New Brandeis movement formed in opposition to this price-centric legal approach.

== Emergence ==
=== Material and economic catalysts ===
Following the 2008 financial crisis, economists and journalists began to document the effects of corporate consolidation in the United States. Since the late 1970s, the American economy had experienced a period of wage stagnation, rising inequality, and the centralization of capital. In his book Cornered (2010), the journalist Barry C. Lynn argued that the suspension of anti-monopoly enforcement in the 1980s allowed a small number of executives and financiers to consolidate control over industrial and financial systems. Lynn viewed this monopolization as creating fragility in the economy, which he identified as a contributing factor to the 2008 financial collapse.

In the decade following the crisis, the technology sector grew significantly. Companies such as Google, Facebook, and Amazon developed a new business model known as the "platform", and through the early years of the recovery they expanded rapidly. These platforms operated as digital intermediaries that brought together different groups of users, extracting data to use as a raw material. Because these services relied heavily on network effects, they became increasingly valuable as more people used them, adding to their market dominance. This dynamic gives platforms a natural tendency towards monopolisation, and a few major firms took control of the internet economy.

=== Foundational texts ===
In response to the growth of these technology companies, legal scholars began to question the effectiveness of existing antitrust laws. In 2017, Lina Khan published the foundational article "Amazon's Antitrust Paradox" in the Yale Law Journal. In the text, Khan argues that the Chicago School's focus on "consumer welfare"—which measures competition primarily through short-term price and output effects—fails to capture the architecture of market power in the 21st century. She uses Amazon as a case study, noting that the company pursued growth over short-term profits. Khan argues that Amazon used predatory pricing to establish dominance in markets like e-books and baby products, and then integrated across multiple business lines to control the infrastructure of e-commerce.

In 2019, a group of scholars and practitioners drafted the "Utah Statement" to formalize the principles of the neo-Brandeis movement. The statement describes the movement as a reaction to 40 years of economic consolidation, which it links to stagnant wages and a widening gap between rich and poor. The authors outline a series of proposed reforms to antitrust doctrine and enforcement. They assert that the protection of fair competition is necessary for a democratic society, and that excessive concentration of private economic power creates anti-democratic political pressures.

== Theory ==
=== Critique of the consumer welfare standard ===
The New Brandeis movement argues that the consumer welfare standard—as advocated by the Chicago school—cannot effectively regulate modern monopolies. Since the late 1970s, antitrust enforcement has focused on price theory, examining monopolies mainly based on whether they raise consumer prices or limit output. Legal scholar Lina Khan claims that this approach overlooks how market power functions in the digital economy. According to her, Internet platforms aim for long-term growth and market share instead of short-term profits. They use predatory pricing to capture markets and establish dominance. Because these companies maintain consumer prices low, their actions usually escape antitrust scrutiny under the consumer welfare standard, which considers below-cost pricing as irrational.

Neo-Brandeisians also focus on the structural role of technology platforms. Khan describes platforms as critical intermediaries that connect different business areas. She points out that a company like Amazon acts as a retailer, a delivery network, and a marketplace for third-party sellers all at once. In Khan's view, this role allows the platform to gather data on its competitors and use that information to undermine them, creating conflicts of interest that disrupt the competitive process. Extending the critique, Manuel Wörsdörfer argues that Apple uses its closed ecosystem to act as a gatekeeper to the internet. Wörsdörfer finds that the company engages in anti-competitive conduct such as "Sherlocking" (copying third-party apps), self-preferencing its own services like Apple Music, and imposing supra-competitive 30% commission fees on app developers. The movement advocates for market structures that prevent anti-competitive practices and would increase scrutiny of mergers, including vertical mergers. Proponents believe antitrust laws should focus less on short-term price effects of mergers and more on improving the market conditions necessary to promote real competition.

=== Support and opposition ===
Individuals who have been described as being associated with the movement include Lina Khan, Tim Wu, Jonathan Kanter, Matt Stoller, and Barry C. Lynn. Senators Cory Booker, Amy Klobuchar and Elizabeth Warren have been described as allies of the movement, and have called on the United States Department of Justice Antitrust Division and Federal Trade Commission to focus their enforcement efforts more on helping workers. The movement has since been the subject of both academic conferences, research papers, and academic journals.

Critics of the New Brandeis movement believe that promoting competition for its own sake keeps inefficient producers in business, preferring a litigation approach grounded in empirical evidence. The term "hipster antitrust" originally began as a Twitter hashtag, and rose to prominence when Senator Orrin Hatch used the term during multiple speeches on the United States Senate floor. Matt Levine of Bloomberg News has written that the term hipster antitrust "appeals to nostalgia for old-fashioned antitrust enforcement". Some proponents of the movement believe the term is pejorative. The term was coined by Konstantin Medvedovsky, an attorney at Dechert, and popularized by disgraced former Federal Trade Commissioner Joshua D. Wright.

== History ==
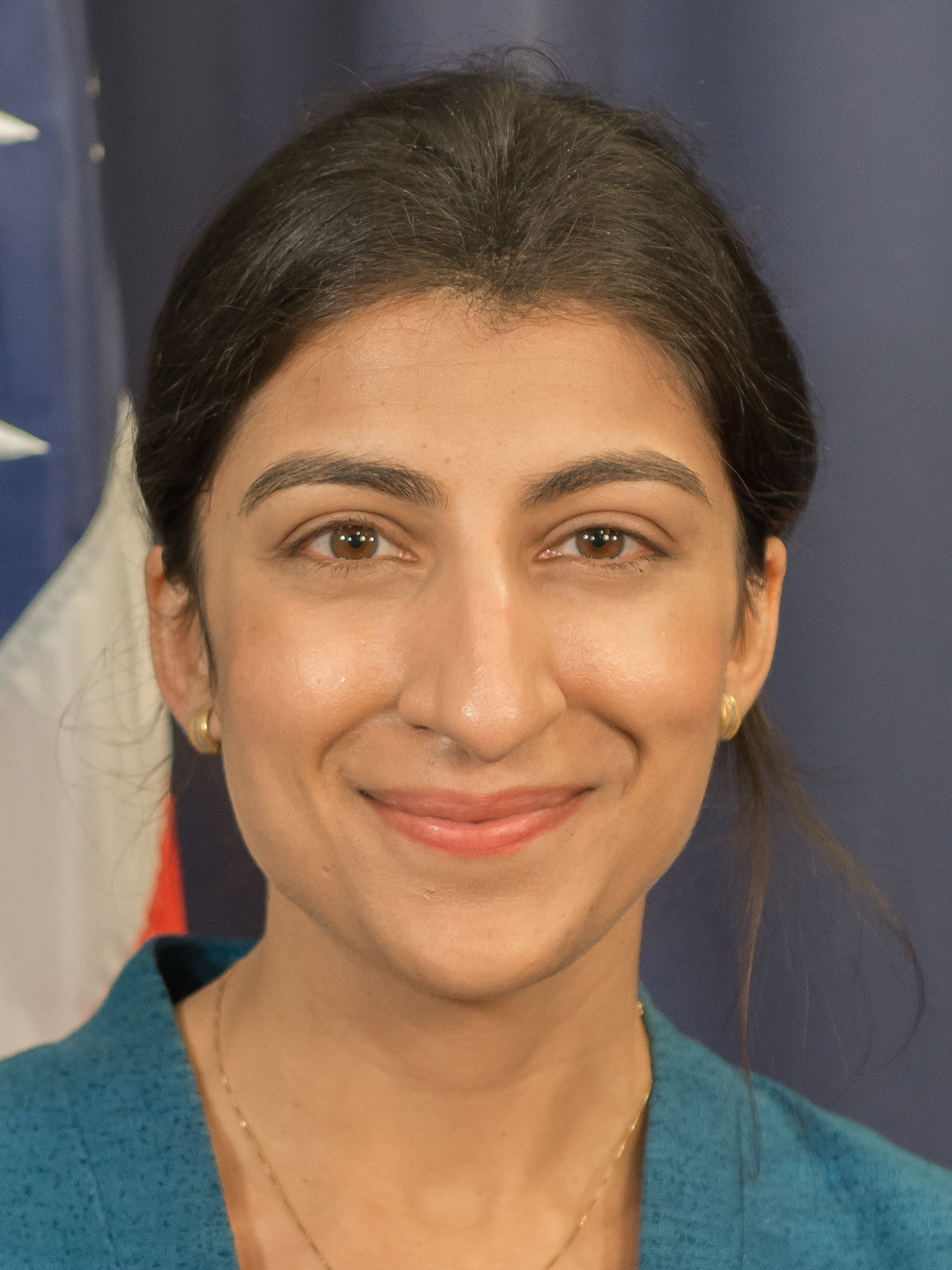
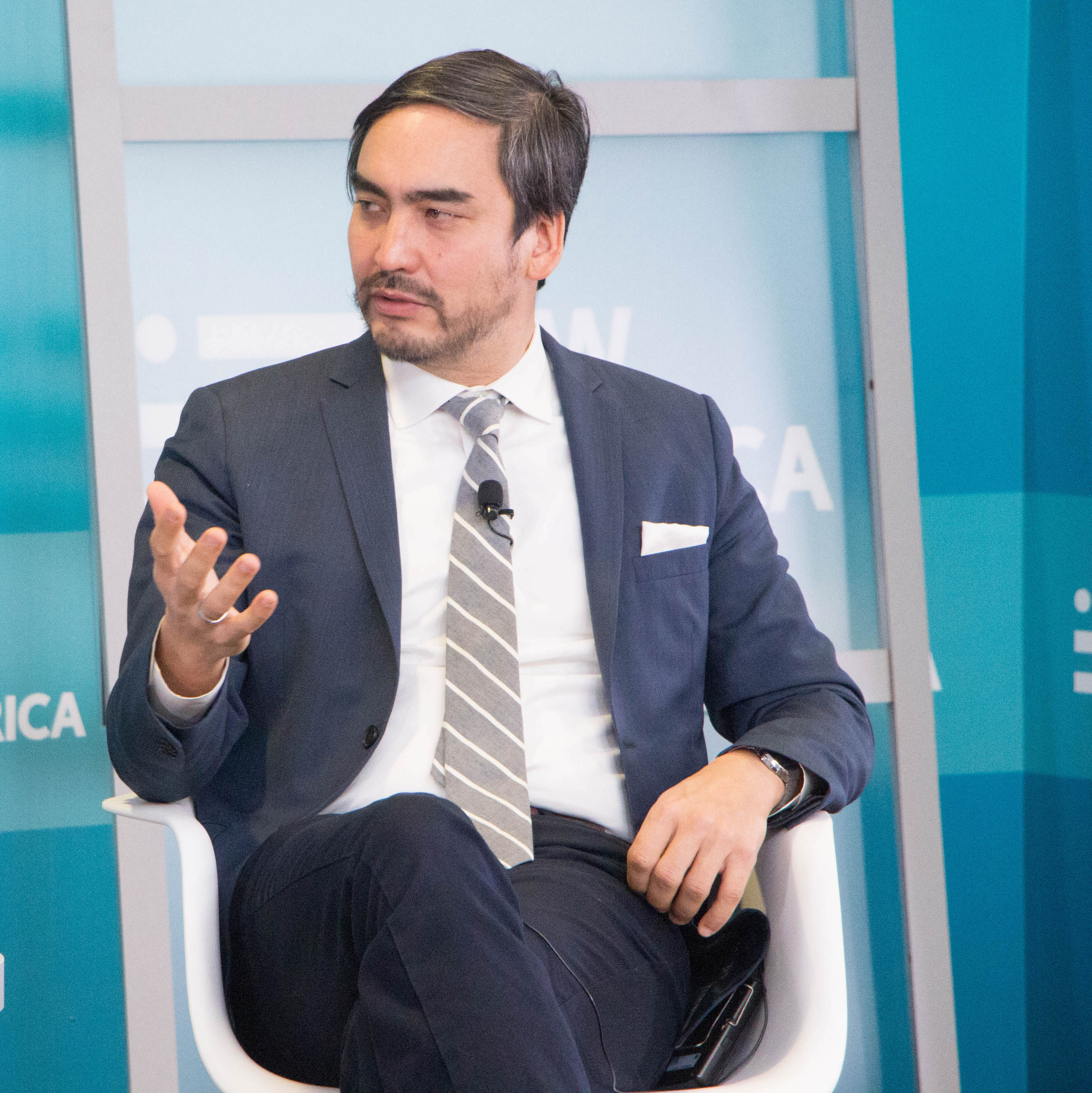
Lina Khan and Tim Wu were foundational members of the movement

=== Biden administration ===
The movement was perceived to grow in influence during the Biden administration, as compared to the prior Trump and Obama presidencies. In 2020, the American Economic Liberties Project (AELP) was founded by several neo-Brandeisians to support regulatory efforts and research, led by Sarah Miller. The Wall Street Journal described the movement as "a new generation of trustbusters" in 2021, arguing that it represented a shift away from a singular focus on perceived consumer welfare that began with the Reagan administration and the ideas of Robert Bork.

In 2021, the White House appointed Tim Wu, a prominent member of the movement at Columbia, to serve as special assistant to the President for Competition and Technology policy. In July 2021, President Biden signed the Executive Order on Promoting Competition in the American Economy, which called for a reinvigoration of competition policy across government. Biden later nominated Jonathan Kanter, a neo-Brandeisian, to serve as assistant attorney general in the Department of Justice Antitrust Division. Kanter was confirmed by the United States Senate by a vote of 68–29 and took office in November 2021. Biden also nominated Lina Khan to be Chair of the Federal Trade Commission. On June 15, 2021, her nomination was confirmed by the Senate by a vote of 69 to 28. Khan was confirmed with bipartisan support.

After Tim Wu, Lina Khan, and Jonathan Kanter, known as the Neo-Brandeisian "troika", were appointed, the U.S. government changed its approach to competition policy. It revised its merger review guidelines and encouraged pro-competition rules at agencies outside antitrust. It also blocked several high-profile mergers, including JetBlue/Spirit, Penguin/S&S and Kroger/Albertsons, and took Google to trial in the first major monopolization case of the 21st century. The movement also experienced some setbacks, including at least one loss against Facebook in court.

In May 2025, Steve Bannon described his team as being Neo-Brandeisians and advocated in favor of Lina Khan's administration of the FTC .

== Bibliography ==
- Bork, Robert H. (1978). The Antitrust Paradox: A Policy at War with Itself. New York: Basic Books. ISBN 1736089714.
- Bradford, Anu (2020). The Brussels Effect: How the European Union Rules the World. Oxford: Oxford University Press. ISBN 978-0190088583.
- Brandeis, Louis D. (1914). Other People's Money and How the Bankers Use It. New York: Frederick A. Stokes.
- Dean, Jodi (2020). "Communism or Neofeudalism?". New Labor Forum. 29 (3): 20–28. doi:10.1177/1095796020942360.
- Foster, John Bellamy; McChesney, Robert W. (2012). The Endless Crisis: How Monopoly-Finance Capital Produces Stagnation and Upheaval from the USA to China. New York: Monthly Review Press. ISBN 978-1583673133.
- Hawley, Ellis W. (1966). The New Deal and the Problem of Monopoly: A Study in Economic Ambivalence. Princeton, NJ: Princeton University Press.
- Hofstadter, Richard (1965). "What Happened to the Antitrust Movement?". The Paranoid Style in American Politics and Other Essays. New York: Knopf.
- Hovenkamp, Herbert (2019). "Is Antitrust's Consumer Welfare Principle Imperiled?". Journal of Corporation Law. 45 (1): 101–127.
- Khan, Lina M. (2017). "Amazon's Antitrust Paradox". The Yale Law Journal. 126 (3): 710–805. Archived from the original on 2020-12-30.
- Lynn, Barry C. (2010). Cornered: The New Monopoly Capitalism and the Economics of Destruction. Hoboken, NJ: John Wiley & Sons. ISBN 978-0470186381.
- Paul, Sanjukta (2020). "Antitrust as Allocator of Coordination Rights". UCLA Law Review. 67 (2): 478–531.
- Shapiro, Carl (2018). "Antitrust in a Time of Populism". International Journal of Industrial Organization. 61: 714–748. doi:10.1016/j.ijindorg.2018.01.001.
- Srnicek, Nick (2017). Platform Capitalism. Cambridge: Polity Press. ISBN 978-1509504879.
- Teachout, Zephyr (2020). Break 'Em Up: Recovering Our Freedom from Big Ag, Big Tech, and Big Money. New York: All Points Books. ISBN 978-1250200891.
- Wright, Joshua D.; Dorsey, Elyse; Klick, Jonathan; Rybnicek, Jan M. (2019). "Requiem for a Paradox: The Flawed Review of History and Economics in Antitrust's Neo-Brandeisian Movement". George Mason Law Review. 26 (4): 1093–1116.
- Wu, Tim (2018). The Curse of Bigness: Antitrust in the New Gilded Age. New York: Columbia Global Reports. ISBN 978-0999745465.
