= Joseph Borkin =

American economic lawyer and book author

Joseph Borkin (12 November 1911 – 5 July 1979) was an American economic lawyer and book author.

== Life and career ==
Born in New York City, Borkin studied economics at New York University (B.A. and M.A.) and law at National University School of Law in Washington, D.C.

Initially, Borkin worked for the US Congress and for a committee of investigations of the US Senate on allegations of corruption against the munitions industry. In 1938, he entered the service of the Department of Justice, Antitrust Division as a Special Assistant to the Assistant Attorney General Thurman Arnold. Early 1943, he published together with Charles Welsh a populist pamphlet against German and international cartels: Germanys Master Plan : The Story of Industrial Offensive. This book combined a middle-class typical aversion against big business with a highly patriotic orientation. The work became a bestseller, was sold in unchanged editions (including a Chinese translation) up to 1946, and even film rights had been sold.

By their book, Borkin and his co-author Charles Welsh provided – even before the works of Corwin D. Edwards and Wendell Berge of 1944 – the first major American pamphlet against international cartels. This was a radical position of the Roosevelt-progressives, who were strong in the American political scene between 1943 and 1946. But their position was answered back from the conservative as well as from the Marxist side as being unrealistic or, respectively, imperialist. The 'grey eminence' behind the campaign seems to have been Thurman Arnold, who had been driven out of his post as head of the Antitrust Division, Department of Justice, by Franklin D. Roosevelt.

Until 1946, he was chief economist in the Antitrust agency and worked on the German IG Farben concern and its international cartel connections. Subsequently, he worked as a freelance lawyer and economic advisor and was affiliated with the office of Lawler, Kent & Eisenberg. He took over a lecture on business ethics at Catholic University of America. In 1978, he published his occupationally collected insights into the history of I.G. Farben under the title The Crime and Punishment of I.G. Farben.

Borkin was member of several professional associations of lawyers and also member of the American Economic Association and of the National Press Club. He also published about literary works, on Sigmund Freud and on the Indonese language, as well as a book about the effectiveness of antitrust prosecutions and one about the role of the lawyer in the Watergate scandal remained uncompleted. Borkin was married to Pauline Borkin; they had two children. He died in Chevy Chase, Maryland.

== Works (in collection) ==
- with Frank C. Waldrop: Television: a struggle for power. Introduction by George Henry Payne. New York, W. Morrow and Co., 1938
- with Charles Welsh: Germany's Master Plan : The Story of Industrial Offensive. Preface by Thurman Arnold. New York: Duell, Sloan, and Pearce, 1943
- with Charles Welsh: Gong ye jin gong zhi gu shi. Shanghai: Shang wu yin shu guan, 1946.
- Robert R. Young, the populist of Wall Street. New York, Harper & Row, 1954
- The Corrupt Judge: an Inquiry into Bribery and Other High Crimes and Misdemeanors in the Federal Courts. New York: Clarkson N. Potter, 1962
- The Crime and Punishment of I.G. Farben. New York: Free Press, 1978
- Die unheilige Allianz der IG Farben. Eine Interessengemeinschaft im Dritten Reich (trans.: The Crime and Punishment of I.G. Farben in German). Translated by Bernhard Schulte. Frankfurt am Main: Campus, 1979
