= Lina Khan =

American legal scholar and jurist (born 1989)

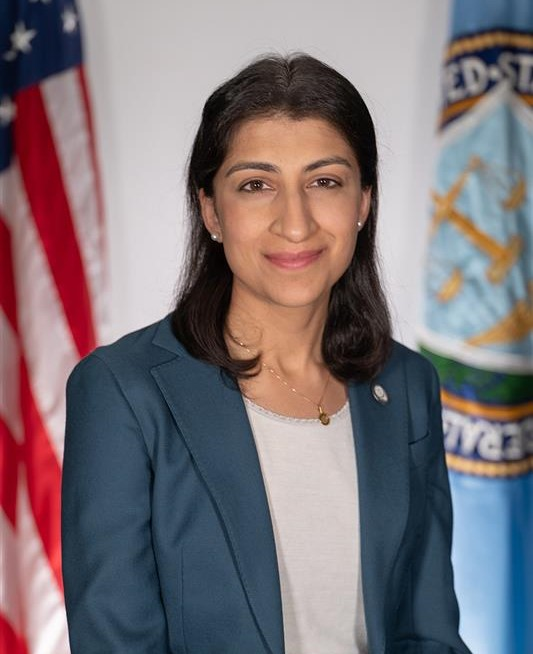
- Official portrait, 2021

Chair of the New York City Economic Development Corporation
- Incumbent
- Assumed office July 22, 2026
- Mayor: Zohran Mamdani
- Preceded by: Margaret Anadu

56th Chair of the Federal Trade Commission
- In office June 15, 2021 – January 20, 2025
- President: Joe Biden
- Preceded by: Rebecca Kelly Slaughter (acting)
- Succeeded by: Andrew N. Ferguson

Commissioner of the Federal Trade Commission
- In office June 15, 2021 – January 31, 2025
- President: Joe Biden; Donald Trump
- Preceded by: Joseph Simons
- Succeeded by: Mark Meador

Personal details
- Born: Lina Maliha Khan; March 3, 1989 (age 37) London, United Kingdom
- Party: Democratic
- Spouse: Shah Rukh Ali (m. 2018)
- Children: 1
- Education: Williams College (BA); Yale University (JD)

Lina Maliha Khan (born March 3, 1989) is an American legal scholar who was the chair of the Federal Trade Commission (FTC) from 2021 to 2025. She is also an associate professor at Columbia Law School.

While a student at Yale Law School, she became known for her work in antitrust and competition law after publishing the essay "Amazon's Antitrust Paradox" in 2017. President Joe Biden nominated her to the FTC in March 2021, and after her confirmation she became the youngest FTC chair ever that June. Khan was a co-chair of Zohran Mamdani's mayoral transitional team, and was appointed by Mamdani as the chair of the New York City Economic Development Corporation.

== Early life and education ==
Khan was born on March 3, 1989, in London, to Pakistani immigrant parents. She grew up in Golders Green in the London Borough of Barnet. Her parents moved to the United States when she was 11 years old. The family settled in Mamaroneck, New York, where she and her two siblings attended public school.

At Mamaroneck High School, Khan was involved in the student newspaper. After high school, she studied political science at Williams College in Massachusetts. She spent her junior year studying at Exeter College, Oxford through the Williams-Exeter Programme at Oxford. She was the editor of the Williams College student newspaper and wrote her senior thesis on Hannah Arendt. She graduated in 2010 with a Bachelor of Arts.

== Advocacy and academic career ==
From 2010 to 2014, Khan worked at the New America Foundation's Open Markets Program, directed by Barry Lynn, where researched and wrote about monopoly and market concentration. Lynn said he had sought a researcher with a background in economics.

As a result of her work at the Open Markets Institute, Khan was offered a reporting position at The Wall Street Journal, where she would have covered commodities. During the same period, she was offered admission into Yale Law School, and she enrolled. She was a submissions editor for the Yale Journal on Regulation. She graduated from Yale in 2017 with a Juris Doctor degree.

=== "Amazon's Antitrust Paradox" ===
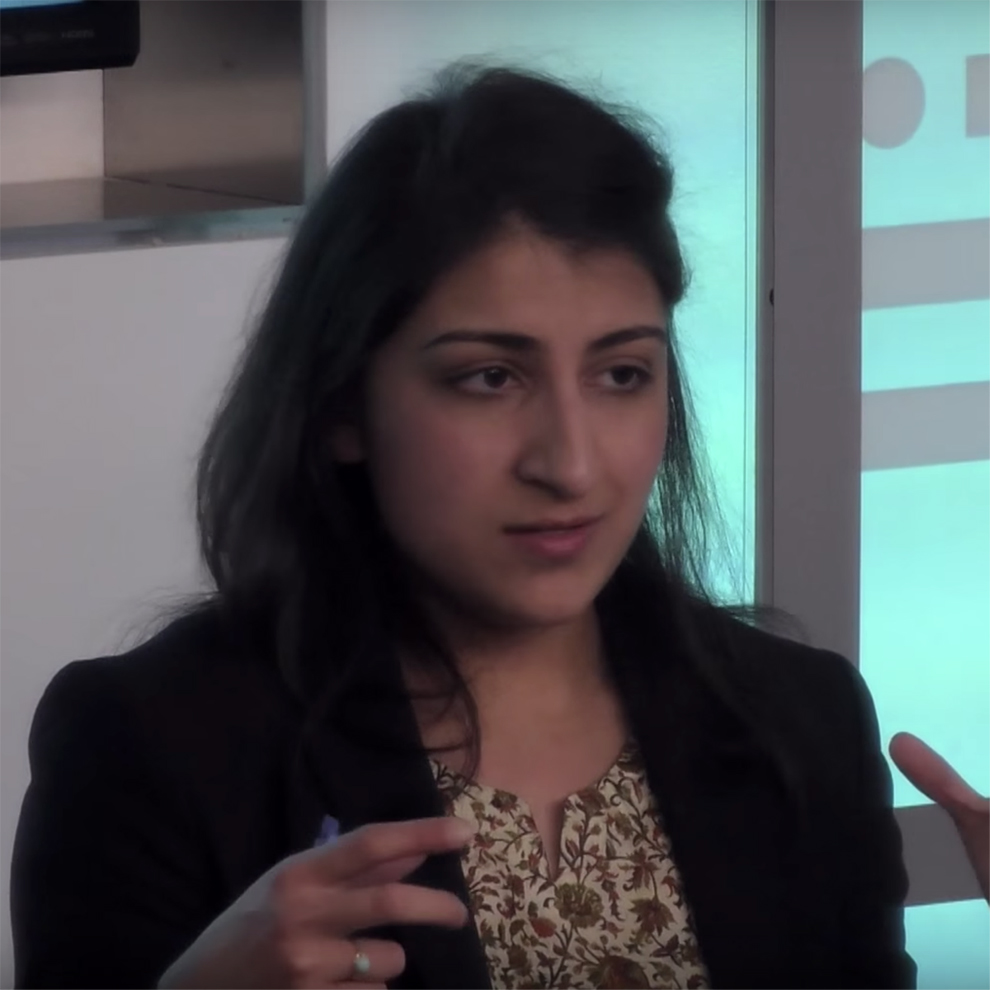
Khan in 2016, speaking on a panel about Amazon and antitrust law

In 2017, during her third year at Yale Law School, the Yale Law Journal published Khan's student article "Amazon's Antitrust Paradox". The article made a significant impact in American legal and business circles, and The New York Times described it as "reframing decades of monopoly law".

In the article, Khan argued that the current American antitrust law framework, which focuses on keeping consumer prices down, cannot account for the anticompetitive effects of platform-based business models such as that of Amazon. The title of her piece was a reference to Robert Bork's 1978 book The Antitrust Paradox, which established the consumer-welfare standard that she critiqued. She proposed alternative frameworks for antitrust policy, including "restoring traditional antitrust and competition policy principles or applying common carrier obligations and duties."

For "Amazon's Antitrust Paradox", Khan won the Antitrust Writing Award for "Best Academic Unilateral Conduct Article" in 2018, the Israel H. Peres Prize by Yale Law School, and the Michael Egger Prize from the Yale Law Journal.

==== Reception ====
The article was met with both acclaim and criticism. As of September 2018, it had received 146,255 hits, "a runaway best-seller in the world of legal treatises," according to The New York Times. Makan Delrahim, then serving as Assistant Attorney General for the Antitrust Division under Donald Trump, praised Khan for her "fresh thinking on how our legal tools apply to new digital platforms".

Joshua Wright, who served on the FTC from 2013 to 2015, and while representing companies including Amazon as a paid consultant, derided Khan's work as "hipster antitrust" and argued it "reveal[ed] a profound lack of understanding of the consumer welfare model and the rule of reason framework." Herbert Hovenkamp wrote that Khan's claims were "technically undisciplined, untestable, and even incoherent", and that her work "never explains how a nonmanufacturing retailer such as Amazon could ever recover its investment in below cost pricing by later raising prices, and even disputes that raising prices to higher levels ever needs to be a part of the strategy, thus indicating that it is confusing predation with investment."

=== Open Markets Institute and Columbia Law School ===
After graduating from law school, Khan worked as legal director at the Open Markets Institute (OMI). The institute split from New America after Khan and her team criticized Google's market power, prompting pressure from Google, a funder of New America. During her time at OMI, Khan met with Senator Elizabeth Warren to discuss anti-monopolistic policy ideas.

Initially planning to clerk for Judge Stephen Reinhardt on the Ninth Circuit Court of Appeals, Khan joined Columbia Law School as an academic fellow, where she pursued research and scholarship on antitrust law and competition policy, especially relating to digital platforms. She published "The Separation of Platforms and Commerce" in the Columbia Law Review, making the case for structural separations that prohibit dominant intermediaries from entering lines of business that place them in direct competition with the businesses dependent on their networks. In July 2020, Khan joined the school's faculty as an associate professor of law.

Khan has described herself as belonging to the New Brandeis movement, a political movement that seeks a revival in antitrust enforcement.

=== Early government service ===
In 2018, Khan worked as a legal fellow at the Federal Trade Commission in the office of Commissioner Rohit Chopra. In 2019, she began serving as counsel to the House Judiciary Committee's Subcommittee on Antitrust, Commercial, and Administrative Law, where she led the congressional investigation into digital markets.

== Chair of the FTC ==
On March 22, 2021, Joe Biden announced that he was nominating Khan to be a commissioner of the Federal Trade Commission to a term ending September 26, 2024. On June 15, 2021, her nomination was confirmed by the Senate by a vote of 69 to 28. Khan was confirmed with bipartisan support, mainly attributed to her "influential anti-Amazon views" being widely reflected in Congress. Biden then appointed her chairperson of the FTC. Upon taking office, Khan became the third Asian American to serve on the FTC, after Dennis Yao (who served from 1991 to 1994) and her former boss Rohit Chopra (who served from 2018 to 2021).

=== Actions and policies ===
In April 2024, the FTC issued a landmark regulation that banned the enforcement of existing non-compete agreements on employees other than senior executives, and prohibited new non-compete agreements against all categories of employees. The non-compete regulation was struck down in August 2024 by a federal court, which ruled that it was an overreach of statutory authority on the part of the FTC to issue such a regulation and that the regulation was arbitrary and capricious.

Khan has been outspoken about potential perils from business monopolies, and also expanding anti-trust regulation and enforcement, among merger filings, of which only two percent receive added scrutiny. During Khan's tenure, the FTC voted unanimously in 2021 to enforce the right to repair as policy and to consider action against companies that limit the type of repair work that can be done at independent repair shops; has pursued lawsuits against companies to lower drug prices, including for insulin and inhalers; and adopted the "click to cancel" rule in 2024 for consumers to efficiently end subscription services.

During her tenure, the FTC had a mixed record in its attempts to block mergers and acquisitions. Through the first half of her tenure, the FTC lost multiple high-profile merger challenges resolved in court, including the Microsoft-Activision Blizzard merger and Meta's acquisition of Within. In December 2023, the FTC won its first major challenge in court by blocking Illumina's acquisition of Grail after a 3-year legal battle. In 2024, the FTC won two major merger challenges in court, blocking Tapestry, Inc.'s attempted acquisition of Capri in November and Kroger's attempted acquisition of Albertsons in December.

=== Accusations of bias ===
Following her appointment as chairperson, both Amazon and Meta Platforms filed petitions with the FTC seeking her recusal from investigations of the companies, suggesting that her past criticism of the companies left her unable to be impartial. According to legal scholar Eleanor Fox, the standard for recusal is very high and unlikely to be met for Khan. Senator Elizabeth Warren and other supporters of Khan argued that the recusal demands amount to an attempt by these companies to intimidate Khan in order to curtail regulatory scrutiny. According to leaked documents, the FTC's Designated Agency Ethics Official (DAEO), Lorielle Pankey, did not believe Khan had violated any ethical standards, but still recommended that she recuse herself from the case with Meta Platforms to avoid the appearance of bias; this recommendation was rejected by Khan and the FTC. Pankey was later revealed to have owned Meta stock at that time, prompting concerns about Pankey's own conduct. In response, Khan and the FTC released a unanimous statement in support of Pankey. Earlier in February 2023, Republican FTC Commissioner Christine Wilson announced her plan to resign from the agency citing her opposition to Khan's leadership, including her refusal to recuse from the FTC lawsuit against Meta.

=== Public debate over policies and role ===
In July 2023, Republicans had Khan testify before the House of Representatives Judiciary Committee. Democrats on the committee defended Khan and the actions of the agency, arguing that she was taking steps that protected user privacy.

Ken Buck, a Republican, praised Khan's actions, and highlighted members of Congress using insider knowledge for stock trading, and noted the disparity between permitting such conduct, and seeking to limit Khan because she "wrote a law review article." Matt Gaetz, a Republican, praised Khan's efforts, citing several offenses by the Ring Doorbell company, and asked Khan to continue investigating them. Similarly, Gaetz noted that Kochava had been selling customer's personal data, and asked Khan to continue investigating and to let Congress know what new laws might be needed.

Khan was noted by both critics and supporters for her aggressive approach to regulation as FTC chair, invoking novel arguments and pursuing non-traditional cases but also risking more losses in court. Khan and the FTC argued that the increase in agency action resulted in an additional deterrence effect, leading to some businesses dropping attempted mergers and acquisitions. Among others, Lockheed Martin's attempted acquisition of Aerojet, as well as Sanofi's attempted acquisition of Maze Therapeutics, were both withdrawn following FTC scrutiny. Khan and her supporters have pointed to these abandoned deals as enforcement victories outside of a judicial environment. During her tenure, House Republicans accused Khan of bringing weak cases in order to push Congress to expand antitrust enforcement authority. In a 2023 Congressional hearing, Khan denied accusations that she brought cases that she expected to lose but acknowledged risks in her aggressive approach in opposing mergers.

=== Agency morale under Khan ===
In the first two years of Khans tenure, FTC employees reported declines in metrics such as employee satisfaction and faith in leadership, according to data from the 2021 and 2022 Federal Employee Viewpoint Surveys conducted by the Office of Personnel Management. Prior to Khan's tenure, the FTC consistently ranked at the top of federal agencies in workplace rankings in both Democratic and Republican administrations. 94.3% of FTC staff had favorable views of senior leadership in 2020, declining to 51.7% in 2021, and to 46.6% in 2022. After Khan's appointment, the FTC switched from ranking first in favorable views of senior leadership among federal agencies to first in unfavorable views.

FTC officials have attributed the decline in employee satisfaction under Khan to a lack of a clear strategy on achieving objectives, a lack of knowledge on agency operations, and disrespect and sidelining of career staff. One of Khan's first acts at the FTC, a ban on public speaking for FTC staff, was widely unpopular with employees and retracted in 2022 with an apology. Khan said it was a priority to improve staff morale following the initial Federal Employee Viewpoint Survey results during congressional testimony in July, 2023. Improvements in employee satisfaction were measured in 2023, reclaiming over half of its decline in morale since 2021.

=== Termination ===
Despite early bipartisan support for her continuing in her role as chairman under President Donald Trump, including positive comments in 2024 from Republican vice presidential candidate JD Vance and former Trump advisor Steve Bannon, Khan was replaced by Andrew N. Ferguson in 2025.

== Post-FTC ==
Following Zohran Mamdani's victory in the 2025 New York City mayoral election, Mamdani named Khan as co-chair of his mayoral transitional team.

In April 2026, Khan became head of the newly formed Center for Law and the Economy at Columbia University.

== New York City Economic Development Corporation chair ==
In July 2026, Mayor Zohran Mamdani announced that Khan would serve as the chair of the New York City Economic Development Corporation.

== Reputation and influence ==
In 2018, Politico described Khan as "a leader of a new school of antitrust thought" as part of its "Politico 50" list of influential thinkers. New York magazine said she was "indisputably the most powerful figure in the anti-monopoly vanguard". She was also listed as one of Foreign Policy's "Global Thinkers", Prospect's "Top 50 Thinkers", Wired's WIRED25, the National Journal's 50, Washingtonian's list of most influential women, and Time's "Next Generation Leaders".

Khan's practices at the FTC have been met with bipartisan praise as well as some criticism. The Wall Street Journal published at least 124 critical pieces of Khan during her antitrust tenure. Ankush Khadori of New York magazine wrote in December 2023 that failed lawsuits against Meta and Microsoft led to reduced morale and high attrition among FTC employees; however, Khan has gained praise for her tactics from members of both the Democratic and Republican parties. In 2024 JD Vance, then a senator from Ohio and current vice president, cited Khan's campaigns against large technology companies as a success for antitrust efforts in the US, beliefs echoed by former Democratic representative David Cicilline, who expressed his confidence that Khan would ultimately prevail against large companies. Former colleague Matt Stoller described Khan as the best chair the FTC has ever had.

== Personal life ==
Khan is married to Shah Rukh Ali, a cardiologist at Columbia University. As of November 2021, the couple lived in New York City. In January 2023, Khan gave birth to her first child.

== Bibliography ==
- Khan, Lina M. (January 2017). "Amazon's Antitrust Paradox". Yale Law Journal. 126 (3): 710–805. Archived from the original on April 23, 2021.
- Khan, Lina (March 1, 2018). "The New Brandeis Movement: America's Antimonopoly Debate". Journal of European Competition Law & Practice. 9 (3): 131–132. doi:10.1093/jeclap/lpy020.
- Khan, Lina (June 4, 2018). "The Ideological Roots of America's Market Power Problem". The Yale Law Journal Forum. 127. Archived from the original on April 20, 2021.
- Khan, Lina (July 2018). "Download Sources of Tech Platform Power" (PDF). Georgetown Law Technology Review. 2: 325–334.
- Khan, Lina (May 2019). "The Separation of Platforms and Commerce" (PDF). Columbia Law Review. 119 (4): 973–1098. Archived (PDF) from the original on March 10, 2021.
- Khan, Lina (July 2019). "Competition Issues in Digital Markets". Competition Law & Policy Debate. 5 (2): 66–70. doi:10.4337/clpd.2019.02.09. ISSN 2405-481X.
- Khan, Lina (Winter 2019). "Comment on Daniel A. Crane: A Premature Postmortem on the Chicago School of Antitrust". Business History Review. 93 (4): 777–779. doi:10.1017/S000768051900151X. S2CID 214322820.
- Khan, Lina (March 2020). "The End of Antitrust History Revisited [reviews]" (PDF). Harvard Law Review. 133 (5): 1655–1683. Archived (PDF) from the original on August 18, 2020.

=== Co-authored works ===
- Teachout, Zephyr; Khan, Lina (2014). "Market Structure and Political Law: A Taxonomy of Power". Duke Journal of Constitutional Law & Public Policy. 9 (1): 37–74.
- Gupta, Deepak; Khan, Lina (Spring 2017). "Arbitration as Wealth Transfer". Yale Law & Policy Review. 35 (2): 499–520.
- Vaheesan, Sandeep; Khan, Lina (Spring 2017). "Market Power and Inequality: The Antitrust Counterrevolution and Its Discontents". Harvard Law & Policy Review. 11 (1): 235–294.
- Pozen, David E.; Khan, Lina (December 2019). "A Skeptical View of Information Fiduciaries". Harvard Law Review. 133 (2): 497–541.
- Chopra, Rohit; Khan, Lina (March 2020). "The Case for 'Unfair Methods of Competition' Rulemaking". University of Chicago Law Review. 87 (2): 357–380.
