= Barry Lynn =

Barry Lynn is the name of:

- Boxcutter (musician) (born 1980), born Barry Lynn, electronic musician from Northern Ireland
- Barry C. Lynn, American writer who covers global economic issues
- Barry W. Lynn (born 1948), American attorney and ordained minister, best known for his leadership of Americans United for the Separation of Church and State
- Barry Lynn (darts player) (born 1987), English darts player
