= Wendell Berge =

American business lawyer (1903–1955)

United States Assistant Attorney General for the Antitrust Division
- In office 1943–1947
- President: Franklin D. Roosevelt
- Preceded by: Thurman Arnold
- Succeeded by: John F. Sonnett

United States Assistant Attorney General for the Criminal Division
- In office 1941–1943
- President: Franklin D. Roosevelt
- Preceded by: O. John Rogge
- Succeeded by: Tom C. Clark

Personal details
- Born: 1903 Lincoln, Nebraska
- Died: September 25, 1955 (aged 51–52) Washington, D.C.
- Parents: George W. Berge (father); Cora Ott Berge (mother)
- Occupation: Business Lawyer, Head of the Antitrust Division of the Department of Justice (1943 to 1947)

Wendell Berge (1903 – September 25, 1955) was an American business lawyer. He served as head of the Antitrust Division of the Department of Justice from 1943 to 1947.

== Early life ==
Berge was born to George W. and Cora Ott Berge in Lincoln, Nebraska. The Berge family was close to the Democratic Party. Berge studied law at the University of Nebraska and graduated with a Bachelor of Laws in 1925. He continued his studies at the University of Michigan, obtaining two juridical doctorate degrees in 1930.

== Career ==
After a brief tenure as a lawyer in New York City, Berge went to Washington, D.C. in 1930 at the invitation of John Lord O'Brian, a prominent antitrust lawyer and head of the Antitrust Division of the Department of Justice. There he worked as a special assistant to the US attorney general before becoming Chief Assistant to the new division head, Thurman Arnold, in 1938. In 1941, Berge was appointed Assistant Attorney General for the Criminal Investigation Division of the Department of Justice by President Franklin D. Roosevelt. In 1943, he became head of the Antitrust Department in the same ministry.

Berge strongly supported the view that any monopoly would harm the free economy. In 1944, he published the book Cartels: Challenge to a Free World, which made Berge, along with Joseph Borkin, Charles Welsh, and Corwin D. Edwards, one of the spokesmen in the new campaign against international cartels. This corresponded to the radical, anti-monopolist position of the Roosevelt Progressivists, which had begun developing in 1937 and dominated American politics between 1943 and 1946. However, this notion of international cartels was rejected by both the conservative and Marxist sides on the premise that it was unrealistic or imperialist. Berge's book became an international success. From 1946 on it was translated into Scandinavian languages, into Russian in 1947 and into Serbo-Croatian in 1953.

After his term as Assistant Attorney General of the United States, Berge worked as a member of the law firm Posner, Berge, Fox & Arent in Washington, D. C.

== Legacy ==
Wendell Berge died on September 25, 1955, in Washington, D.C. from a heart attack.

The Washington Post lamented in its obituary that “(t)he death of Wendell Berge takes from Washington one of its most public-spirited lawyers and a man who made a notable record in antitrust enforcement.”

== Works and speeches ==
- Criminal jurisdiction and the territorial principle. Dissertation, University of Michigan Law School 1928.
- The Case of the S. S. ‘Lotus’. In: Michigan Law Review. Band 26, 1928, Nr. 4 (19280201), S. 361–382.
- The monopoly investigation, what it means. An address before national retail credit association. 20 February 1939, Rochester, New York.
- What shall we do about cartels in the post-war period? An address ... prepared for delivery at a conference of the People's Lobby, Inc. 12 February 1944.
- Cartels: Challenge to a Free World. Public Affairs Press, Washington 1944.
- What substitute for private international cartels? An address ... prepared for delivery before the People's Lobby (broadcast over NBC). 3 May 1945.

== Sources ==
- Orbituary of Christian Register, November 1955, http://www.harvardsquarelibrary.org/biographies/wendell-berge/
