= Mark Meador =

American attorney and FTC Commissioner

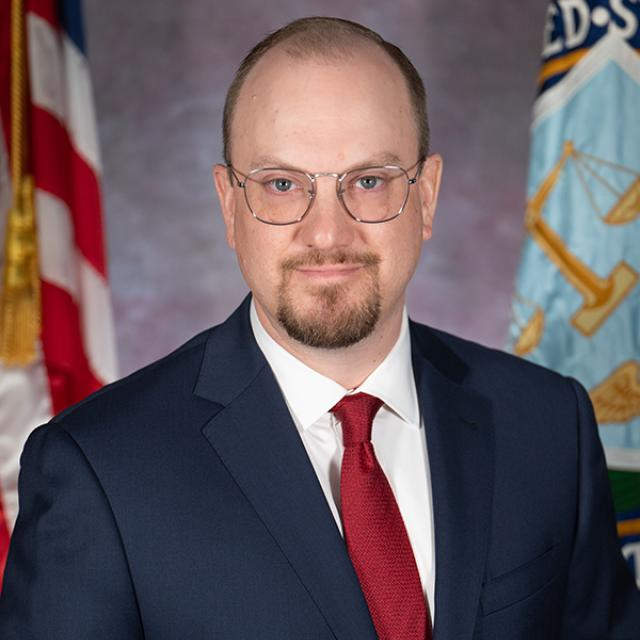

Commissioner of the Federal Trade Commission
- Incumbent
- Assumed office April 16, 2025
- President: Donald Trump
- Preceded by: Lina Khan

Personal details
- Born: March 16, 1985 (age 41) Bloomington, Indiana, U.S.
- Party: Republican
- Education: University of Chicago (BA); University of Houston (JD)

Mark Ross Meador (born March 16, 1985) is an American lawyer serving since April 2025 as a commissioner of the Federal Trade Commission.

== Early life ==
Meador was born on March 16, 1985, in Bloomington, Indiana. He graduated from the University of Chicago in 2007 with a Bachelor of Arts in philosophy and from the University of Houston Law Center in 2011 with a Juris Doctor degree. Meador, a Republican, is a member of the Federalist Society.

== Career ==
Meador focuses on antitrust law, having gained an interest from a class he took at Houston. He worked for a time in the office of the Texas Attorney General and after he graduated from Houston, he worked from 2011 to 2016 as an attorney in the FTC's Bureau of Competition. From 2016 to 2019, Meador was in private practice at the law firm Paul, Weiss, Rifkind, Wharton & Garrison.

Meador joined the United States Department of Justice in 2019 as a trial attorney in the Antitrust Division, where he served two years. He then joined the office of Utah U.S. Senator Mike Lee, where he held the position of Deputy Chief Counsel for Antitrust and Competition Policy. He worked for Lee, the minority leader of the Senate Antitrust Subcommittee, until 2023. During his time in Lee's office, Meador drafted a bill for Lee that would have required Google's ad tech business to break up. After his tenure with Lee's office, he became a partner with Kressin Law Group, then renamed Kressin Meador LLC.

On December 10, 2024, President-elect Donald Trump announced he was nominating Meador to serve as a commissioner on the Federal Trade Commission. His nomination was confirmed by the Senate on April 11, 2025.

Bloomberg Law has described Meador as "a pro-enforcement, populist Republican, particularly when it comes to the technology industry."

== Personal life ==
Meador and his wife, Adrienne Lee Meador, have six children.
