= Sanford Litvack =

American politician

United States Assistant Attorney General for the Antitrust Division
- In office 1979 – January 20, 1981
- President: Jimmy Carter
- Preceded by: John H. Shenefield
- Succeeded by: William Baxter

Personal details
- Born: April 29, 1936 (age 89) Brooklyn, New York City, New York
- Party: Democratic

Sanford Litvack (born April 29, 1936) is an American attorney who served as the United States Assistant Attorney General for the Antitrust Division from 1979 to 1981.
