= Naked Capitalism =

American financial news and analysis blog

- Homepage dated November 1, 2014
- Website type: Financial news and analysis
- Available in: English
- Owner: Aurora Advisors Incorporated
- Creator: Yves Smith
- Website: www.nakedcapitalism.com
- Commercial: Yes
- Registration: None
- Launched: December 2006; 19 years ago
- Current status: Online

Naked Capitalism is a left-wing American financial news and analysis group blog. Susan Webber, the principal of Aurora Advisors Incorporated, a management-consulting firm based in New York City, launched the site in late 2006, using the pen name Yves Smith. She focused on finance and economic news and analysis, with an emphasis on legal and ethical issues of the banking industry and the foreclosure process, the 2008 financial crisis, the Great Recession, and its aftermath. Since 2020, the site has also provided a special, continuing coverage of the COVID-19 pandemic. The site became one of the most highly frequented financial blogs on the Internet, and has published a number of noted exposés since.

== Background ==
Webber graduated from Harvard College and Harvard Business School. She began her career in the financial services industry in 1981 at Goldman Sachs, later moving to McKinsey & Co. and Sumitomo Bank. In 1989, she founded her own company.

Webber started the Naked Capitalism blog because she saw a reporting gap in 2006, just before the 2008 financial crisis – there was a lot of anxiety among seasoned observers, yet the US press featured "all this cheerleading [of the financial industry] and there was a lack of any skepticism [...] How could anyone in the market not see what was going on? That we were going to have some sort of train wreck?"

Webber has also written under her pen name – a pun on the 18th-century economist Adam Smith – for other outlets including the New York Times, New York magazine, Bloomberg, and the Roosevelt Institute.

== Contributing writers ==
Naked Capitalism is written by a small group of contributors. In addition to Webber herself, current and former contributors include:

- Lambert Strether
- Nick Corbishley
- Conor Gallagher
- Philip Pilkington
- David Dayen
- Michael Hudson
- Matt Stoller
- Nathan Tankus
- Jerri-Lynn Scofield
- Andrew Dittmer
- Edward Harrison
- Richard Smith (UK editor)

== Reception ==
Naked Capitalism became widely read during the 2008 financial crisis as people were trying to come to grips with what was happening. This led to TV appearances for Smith on stations such as CNBC, CNN, Fox News and PBS, and she was approached to write a book on the crisis.

In a 2010 piece critiquing the Wall Street Journal's coverage of the foreclosure scandal, the Columbia Journalism Review noted that the Wall Street Journal was being "outclassed" by Naked Capitalism. In 2011, TIME included Naked Capitalism among "The 25 Best Financial Blogs", saying that Smith had been well ahead of the curve in understanding the 2008 financial crisis. Stephen Gandel, reviewing Naked Capitalism for TIME, said that "At times, Naked Capitalism's accusations against Wall Street can be hard to prove. But the blog's sense of right and wrong rings true to me."

In 2011, CNBC listed the site as one of the "20 Most Influential Finance Blogs", describing Smith as "a harsh critic of Wall Street who believes that fraud was at the center of the financial crisis." In 2013, Wired included the blog among its "favorite sources of news covering the world of business and finance", saying Smith offered a "piercing look at the ethical and legal missteps of the global financial industry."

Documentary filmmaker Alex Gibney told The New York Times that the "blog gives you a very unvarnished look at the political economy. You find out things that don't show up in the news until weeks later." The New York Times financial reporter Gretchen Morgenson cited Naked Capitalism in 2014 as one of the "must-read financial blogs" she visited regularly.

In 2014, Naked Capitalism obtained and published twelve Limited Partnership Agreements (LPA) – agreements between private equity firms and their portfolio companies that are termed trade secrets, an area the SEC's Special Inspector Andrew J. Bowden had promised to look into. In 2015, Naked Capitalism drew attention to comments Bowden had recently made at a Stanford Law School conference that many observers felt were inappropriate and a sign of "regulatory capture" – a regulator becoming too friendly with an industry their profession requires them to regulate. Bowden stepped down shortly after.

In 2018, a Naked Capitalism article highlighting discrepancies in the work résumé of the Chief Financial Officer of the $410 billion California Public Employees' Retirement System (CalPERS) was followed by the executive's departure. In 2020, a Naked Capitalism blog post pointing out disclosure discrepancies toppled the same organization's chief investment officer. Naked Capitalism said the officer had personally invested in some of the same private equity groups CalPERS had invested in, creating a conflict of interest.

Naked Capitalism was cited by Dow Jones & Company in an amicus brief for the 2020 U.S. Supreme Court case Allen v. Cooper. Since 2021, the site has been archived monthly in the Economics Blogs Web Archive at the Library of Congress.

== Books ==
- Yves Smith (2010), ECONned, Palgrave Macmillan, ISBN 978-0-230-62051-3
- Naked Capitalism Whistleblower Report on Bank of America Foreclosure Reviews (free e-book, 2013)
