= American Economic Liberties Project =

Anti-monopoly non-profit think tank

- Formation: February 2020
- Executive Director: Nidhi Hegde
- Website: economicliberties.us

The American Economic Liberties Project (AELP) is an American non-profit organization that advocates for corporate accountability legislation and aggressive enforcement of antitrust regulations.

== History ==
The American Economic Liberties Project was launched in February 2020 by Sarah Miller, who had previously served as deputy director of the Open Markets Institute. The organization initially planned to spend approximately $3 million during its first year, with backing from philanthropic organizations including the Omidyar Network. Its early agenda included organizing small businesses affected by dominant firms, linking corporate concentration to national security concerns, and promoting stricter competition.

== Leadership ==
Sarah Miller served as the organization's founding executive director from February 2020 until March 2023, when she left to join the Federal Trade Commission as an adviser to chair Lina Khan. Faiz Shakir was appointed interim executive director in March 2023, while Nidhi Hegde became managing director. Hegde succeeded Shakir as interim executive director in February 2024 and was later appointed permanent executive director.

== Funding ==
The AELP is funded in part by the Omidyar Network which is funded by billionaire Pierre Omidyar. It is considered an important organization in the New Brandeis movement, which focuses on modern antitrust efforts.

== Activities ==
The organization praised the nominations of Lina Khan to serve on the Federal Trade Commission (FTC) and of Jonathan Kanter to serve as Assistant Attorney General for the Antitrust Division.

== Reception ==
Reuters describes AELP as an influence organization focused on anti-monopoly activism and reported that its recommendations were among the ideas used in the incoming Biden administration to influence competition policy. The White House, during Biden's presidency, cited AELP research in materials accompanying President Biden's 2021 competition executive order.

Critics of the neo-Brandeisian approach have disputed AELP's analysis and policy prescriptions. The Information Technolgy and Innovation Foundation argued that AELP's proposals concerning targeted advertising, Section 230 and common-carrier obligations would impose costs on consumers, small businesses and online speech. ITIF also challenged AELP research linking corporate concentration to lobbying, saying the analysis did not adequately account for regulatory changes and other variables. The Disruptive Competition Project similarly argued that AELP's assessments of large technology platforms gave insufficient quantitative attention to consumer benefits.
