= Corwin D. Edwards =

American economist

Corwin D. Edwards (born 1 November 1901 in Nevada, Missouri; died 21 April 1979 in Dallas) was an American economist.

== Academic career ==
Edwards was born in Nevada, Missouri. He studied economics and graduated from the University of Missouri. He then went on a Rhodes scholarship to Oxford University in England and earned his doctorate in 1928 in economics from Cornell University in Ithaca, New York, with a dissertation on a trade union topic. He began his academic career by teaching at New York University. After two decades (from 1933) as a civil servant, he began again in 1953 with academic teaching. He spent one year at Cambridge University in England and another at the University of Virginia. Between 1955 and 1963, Edwards was a professor of business and government at the University of Chicago, and from 1963 to 1971 professor of economics at the University of Oregon.

== Activity as author ==
Edwards published until 1979 a variety of articles and monographs. He was widely interested and followed the politically current objects. He treated a.o. topics of

- Unionism,
- Marketing,
- Advertising,
- Competition policy,
- Antitrust,
- Monopoly,
- Cartels,
- Corporate Business Concentration,
- Price regulation,
- Patents,
- Consumer interests.

Since the 1940s, he relocated to the field of cartels and restrictions of competition, to which he expressed himself to creators repeatedly. Edwards delivered in 1944 - in addition to the works of Joseph Borkin, Charles Welsh and Wendell Berge - the third US main pamphlet against international cartels. This was a radical position of the Roosevelt Progressivists, who dominated between 1943 and 1946. It was rejected by both the conservative and Marxist side as unrealistic or imperialist. The 'gray eminence' behind the campaign appears to have been Thurman Arnold, who had been removed from his post as chief contender (the antitrust division) by Franklin D. Roosevelt. Edward's main concern was state competition policy, which defended consumer interests against big business. For his institutional economic work, he received in 1978 the Veblen-Commons Award from the Association for Evolutionary economics.

== Activity for the public sector and as appraiser ==
Edwards joined the civil service in 1933, becoming assistant director for consumer affairs at the National Recovery Administration, a New Deal plan authority under Franklin D. Roosevelt. In 1937 he moved to the Federal Trade Commission, where he became chief economist. Between 1939 and 1944 he was economic adviser and chairman of the Political Advisory Council of the Antitrust Department in the Ministry of Justice. In 1948 he returned to the Federal Trade Commission as director of the Office of Industrial Management, where he remained until 1953. Edwards was often commissioned with appraisals or consulting assignments. In 1942 he worked on a US project to solve economic problems in Brazil and in 1947 was head of the expert group on Japanese conglomerates. He was a consultant to the US delegation to the United Nations for many years and testified to antitrust cases before Congressional committees.

== Private life ==
Edward was initially married to Jane Morris Ward, but was divorced. His second wife was Gertrud Greig. This resulted in two children (one of them Ward Edwards) and five grandchildren.

== Writings (in selection) ==
- The First International Workingmens̕ Association. Ithaca, NY. 1928.
- Some consumer problems. In: Berman, Edward: Economic problems in a changing world. - New York : Farrar & Rinehart, Inc. Publishers - 1939, S. 15–187.
- Economic and political aspects of international cartels. A study made for the Subcommittee on War Mobilization of the Committee on Military Affairs, United States Senate pursuant to S. Res. 107. A resolution authorizing a study of the possibilities of better mobilizing the national resources of the United States. Washington: Gov. Pr. Off.1944 und 1946.
- The Effect of Recent Basing Point Decisions Upon Business Practices. In: The American Economic Review 38 (1948). no. 5, S. 828–842.
- Regulation of monopolistic cartelization. In: Ohio State Law Journal 14 (1953), p. 252-278.
- Foreign trade and the antitrust laws : hearings before the Subcommittee on Antitrust and Monopoly of the Committee on the Judiciary, U. S. Senate, Washington, D. C., Bd. 1.1964, S. 481–598.
- Concentration data and concentration concepts in Japan. In: Economic concentration : hearings before the Subcommittee on Antitrust and Monopoly of the Committee on the Judiciary, United States Senate. - Washington : U. S. Gov. Print. Off. - Bd. 7a.1969, S. 4252–4256.
- The multimarket enterprise and economic power : remarks upon receipt of the Veblen-Commons Award, . In: Journal of economic issues. – Philadelphia, Taylor & Francis Group, ISSN 0021-3624, ZDB-ID 4105369 - Bd. 13.1979, 2, S. 285–301.

== Secondary literature ==
- Obituary of Washington Post on 27. April 1979.
- Freyer, Tony A.: Antitrust and Global Capitalism, 1930–2004. Cambridge: Cambridge University Press, 2006, pp. 43–49.
