= ECONned =

2010 non-fiction book by Yves Smith

- Hardcover edition
- Author: Yves Smith
- Language: English
- Genre: Finance
- Publisher: Palgrave Macmillan
- Publication date: 2010
- Publication place: United States
- Media type: Print (Hardback)
- Pages: 368
- ISBN: 978-0-230-62051-3
- OCLC: 928874354

ECONned: How Unenlightened Self Interest Undermined Democracy and Corrupted Capitalism is a 2010 non-fiction book by Yves Smith, the pseudonymous founder of the Naked Capitalism blog. Smith was approached to write the book after her blog attracted a growing readership during the 2008 financial crisis.

== Content ==
The book describes how the deregulation of the financial industry and the systemic incentives for managers to "loot" limited liability companies led to the build-up and eventual collapse of the credit bubble during the 2000s. Smith argues that free market economists hold much of the blame for the 2008 financial crisis due to their outsized (and unchecked) influence over policy makers. In particular, she takes issue with faux empirical approaches used by economists and the masking of complex social phenomena in simple mathematical equations, based on assumptions that are openly acknowledged to be wrong or in error. The book makes the case that overreliance on the assumption of a "self-correcting" free market led to a period of unregulated speculation, accounting tricks, and public looting.

== Reception ==
The book was reviewed in Monthly Review, in Contemporary Sociology, in Central Banking and by The Guardian, the South China Morning Post, Benzinga and ScienceBlogs.

Richard Du Boff, writing in Monthly Review, likened the book to a "Baedeker for the economics profession", adding that at the outset, "Smith promises to explain to the reader 'how the widespread adoption of largely unproved but widely accepted economic theories led to policies that produced the global financial crisis that began in 2007 ... [and] how ideologies defend themselves even as evidence against them mounts.'" According to Du Boff, the "capstone chapter of Econned shows, better than anything written to date, how three interrelated types of innovations in a deregulated financial sector—securitization (most dangerously in the form of collateralized debt obligations or CDOs), repurchase agreements (repos), and credit default swaps—created a shadow banking system that led to the credit crisis of 2008 and economic breakdown in 2009." Du Boff continued, "Econned comes with a compendium of topics that add real value to this book—on structured finance (the basis of CDOs), neoclassical economics and the incoherence of its demand function, Gaussian distributions (hijacked for false promises of estimating the odds of default in large groups of securities), and shorting subprime bonds in large quantities."

Neil Fligstein, writing in Contemporary Sociology, said Smith's book would be of interest to sociologists inasmuch as she "places part of the blame for the crisis on the economics profession. She argues that the development of modern economics has produced an attitude towards markets that underestimates exactly the kind of problems that were created by financial market innovations." According to Smith, regulatory failures were the result of the use of economic theory by policymakers who never really understood the kind of financial markets they were creating—a kind of "cognitive regulatory capture whereby policymakers came to share the decision-making premises of the financial community." Even so, Fligstein continues, Smith does not blame economists: "This book tries to view the financial markets as a system (something which is lacking in almost all of the current books)." Following the repeal of the Glass-Seagall Act, this system encouraged predatory behavior by firms, financial products designed to lack transparency, and a focus on transactions.

Steven Poole, reviewing the book for The Guardian, said Smith discussed "subprime, greedy bankers and the like, with often riveting results [...] She initiates the reader elegantly into the jargon (eg a "repo haircut", not Harry Dean Stanton's barnet), and has a gift for summing up pages of crunchy analysis with a vivid précis, calling the post-bailout rules in the US "a looter's wet dream", and that country itself (after a former IMF official) "a banana republic in denial."

In his review in The South China Morning Post, titled "Brutal truth about the biggest con game of all", Kevin Rafferty said, "If you only read one book on the global financial crisis, it should be Econned by 'Yves Smith', an entertaining, thorough and damning indictment of the way that Western economists, bankers and politicians together messed up—and are still messing up—the global financial and economic system."
