= Gabriel Arana =

American journalist (born 1983)

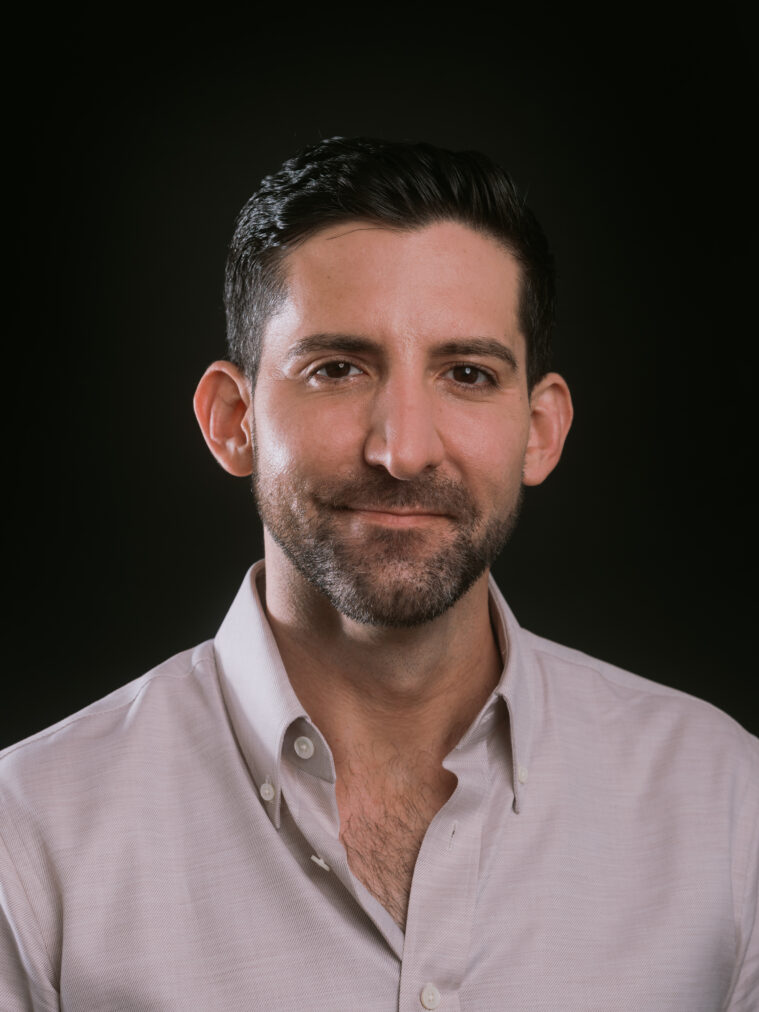
- Born: Gabriel Arana; April 10, 1983 (age 43)
- Education: Yale University (B.A.)
- Occupation: Journalist
- Website: www.gabearana.com

Gabriel Arana (born April 10, 1983) is an American journalist. He was previously editor-in-chief of the Texas Observer, contributing writer at Salon, senior editor at The Huffington Post, and senior editor at The American Prospect. His articles have appeared in publications including The New York Times, The Atlantic, The New Republic, The Nation, The Advocate, and The Daily Beast. He is also known for writing a 2012 profile of the ex-gay movement in which psychiatrist Robert Spitzer repudiated his work supporting sexual orientation change efforts. After the article was published, Spitzer released a letter apologizing to the gay community, citing his interaction with Arana. In 2010, Arana was nominated for a GLAAD Media Award for Outstanding Magazine Article for a feature story on the legal challenge to California's Proposition 8. In 2014, he was awarded the National Lesbian and Gay Journalists Association's Excellence in Feature Writing Award for his profile of activist Dan Choi. He has been a guest on television and radio talk shows including The Dr. Oz Show, Rachel Maddow, Starting Point, and Talk of the Nation.

== Texas Observer ==
In March 2023, the board of the Texas Observer voted to lay off the entire staff of the magazine and cease publication because of a budget shortfall. Led by Arana, the staff of the Observer launched a successful fundraising campaign that raised more than $300,000 over the span of a few days, leading the board to rescind the layoffs.

== Personal background ==
Gabriel Arana grew up in Nogales, Arizona, on the Mexico–United States border. He attended Yale University where he wrote for the Yale Daily News and graduated with a degree in linguistics. He then attended Cornell University, from which he holds a master's degree, also in linguistics. He married his same-sex partner in Washington, D.C. in 2011.
