= Michael J. Egan =

American politician (1926–2016)

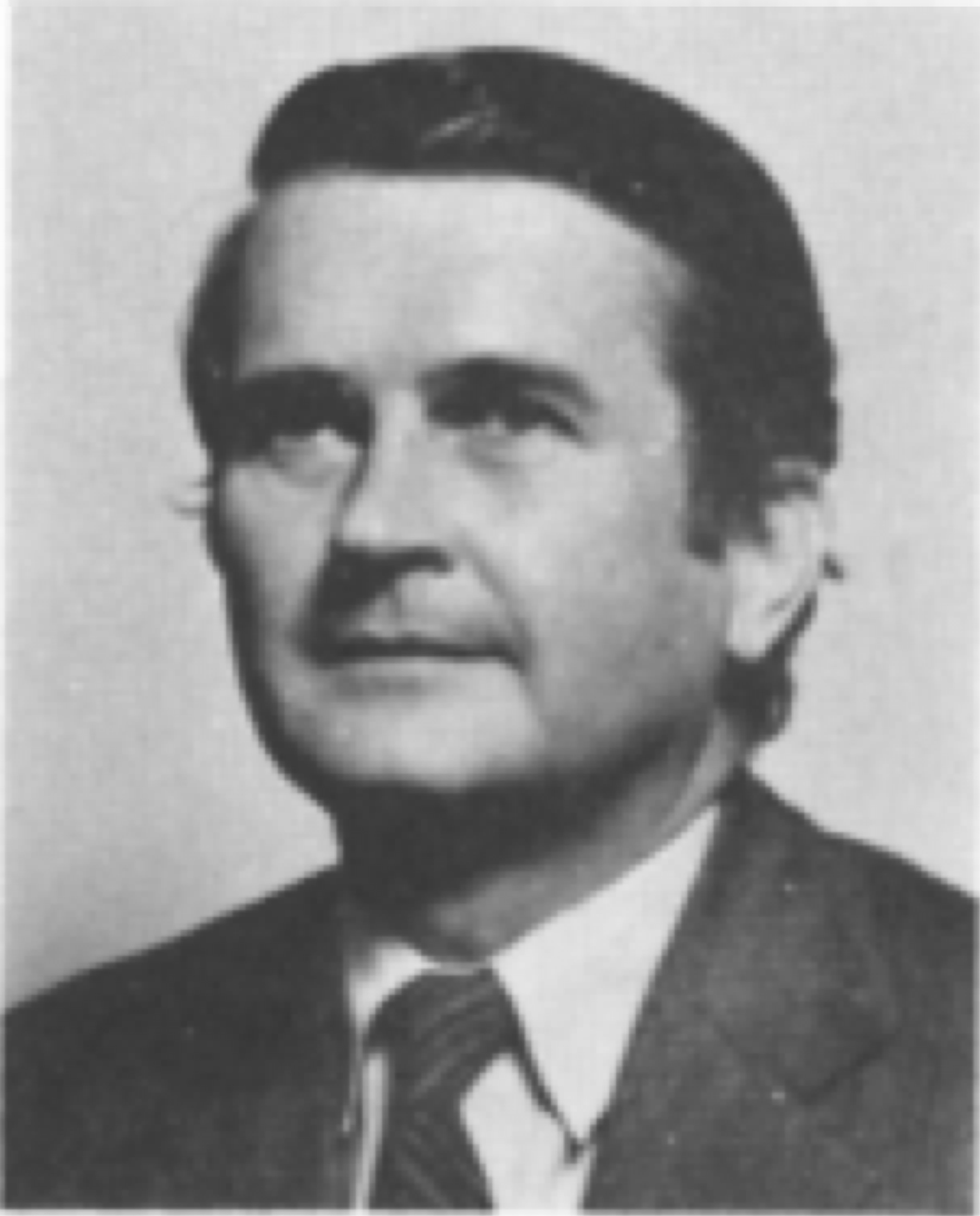
- Official portrait, circa 1975

Member of the Georgia Senate from the 40th district
- In office June 1989 – January 2001
- Preceded by: Paul Coverdell
- Succeeded by: Rusty Paul

1st United States Associate Attorney General
- In office 1977–1979
- President: Jimmy Carter
- Preceded by: Position created
- Succeeded by: John H. Shenefield

Member of the Georgia House of Representatives from the 25th district
- In office January 1973 – June 1977
- Succeeded by: John Savage

Member of the Georgia House of Representatives from the 116th district
- In office January 1969 – January 1973

Member of the Georgia House of Representatives from the 141st district
- In office January 1966 – January 1969

Personal details
- Born: Michael Joseph Egan, Jr. August 8, 1926 Savannah, Georgia, U.S.
- Died: January 7, 2016 (aged 89) Sandy Springs, Georgia, U.S.
- Party: Republican
- Spouse: Donna Cole (m. 1951)
- Children: 6
- Education: Yale University (BS); Harvard University (LLB)

Military service
- Allegiance: United States
- Branch/service: United States Army
- Years of service: 1945–1947; 1950–1952
- Battles/wars: World War II; Korean War

Michael Joseph Egan, Jr. (August 8, 1926 – January 7, 2016) was an American lawyer and politician who served as a member of the Georgia General Assembly and as the first United States associate attorney general.

== Early life and education ==
Egan was born to Elise (Robider) and Michael Joseph Egan on August 8, 1926, in Savannah, Georgia. The grandson of an Irish immigrant, the Egans had resided in Savannah for generations. Egan attended elementary school taught by the Marist Brothers. He left home to attended prep school in Portsmouth, Rhode Island at Portsmouth Priory School, and graduated in 1945. That same year, Egan was drafted into the United States Army in the concluding year of World War II and was commissioned a second lieutenant, serving in the 86th Infantry Division. Egan was discharged in 1947, after the war's end, and enrolled in Yale University, graduating in 1950. During the Korean War, Egan was promoted to the rank of first lieutenant and recalled to active duty, serving in the 2nd Infantry Division until his discharge in 1952. He then entered Harvard Law School, receiving his law degree in 1955.

== Career ==
After graduating from law school, Egan returned to Georgia and established a law practice in Atlanta.

Egan was first elected to the Georgia House of Representatives in 1966 and served until 1977. In 1977, Egan resigned from the House when he was appointed United States associate attorney general, by President Jimmy Carter. In 1979, Egan resumed his law practice.

In 1988, he ran for a seat in the Georgia State Senate in a special election, to replace Senator Paul Coverdell who was appointed to the position of director of the Peace Corps by President George H. W. Bush on May 2, 1989. Egan was elected to Coverdell's vacated Senate seat in June, 1989. He served in the Senate, representing District 40 in Metropolitan Atlanta from 1989 to 2001. Egan's willingness to occasionally support an unpopular cause, driven to do so by his own set of ethics, won the respect of colleagues, Republicans and Democrats alike. He became known as "the conscience of the senate" by his Republican colleagues.

After his legislative career ended, Egan, who had retired from active practice with the Atlanta law firm of Sutherland Asbill and Brennan, continued his affiliation with the firm in "as counsel" capacity. In 2001, he was one of the first people appointed to the newly created Metropolitan North Georgia Water Planning District by Governor Roy Barnes. Egan also served on the board of the Trust for Public Land.

== Death ==
Egan died at his home on January 7, 2016, at the age of 89.

== Notes ==
Legal offices
| Preceded by office established | United States Associate Attorney General; 1977–1979 | Succeeded by John H. Shenefield |
