= Kochava =

Mobile advertising and data broker company

- Type: Private
- Industry: Advertising
- Founded: 2011; 15 years ago in Sandpoint, Idaho, USA
- Headquarters: Sandpoint, Idaho
- Website: kochava.com

Kochava is a mobile advertising and data broker company. They specialize in mobile attribution and analytics for connected devices.

== Lawsuits ==
In 2022, the US Federal Trade Commission (FTC) investigated Kochava, for selling consumer's private data. In 2024, the FTC added Collective Data Solutions LLC, a subsidiary of Kochava, as a defendant.

In February 2024, a judge ruled the FTC could sue Kochava. The FTC's lawsuit asserted that Kochava specialized in collecting data on individuals' locations as gleaned from mobile device data, then sold that data to various companies.

== See also ==
- Data mining
- Lina Khan
