= James F. Rill =

American politician

United States Assistant Attorney General for the Antitrust Division
- In office June 26, 1989 – May 17, 1992
- President: George H. W. Bush
- Preceded by: Charles Rule
- Succeeded by: Anne Bingaman

Personal details
- Born: March 4, 1933 Evanston, Illinois
- Died: November 21, 2025 (aged 92) Washington, D.C.
- Party: Republican

James F. Rill (March 4, 1933 – November 21, 2025) was an American attorney who served as the United States Assistant Attorney General for the Antitrust Division from 1989 to 1992.

He died on November 21, 2025, in Washington, D.C. at age 92.
