= David Dayen =

American journalist and author

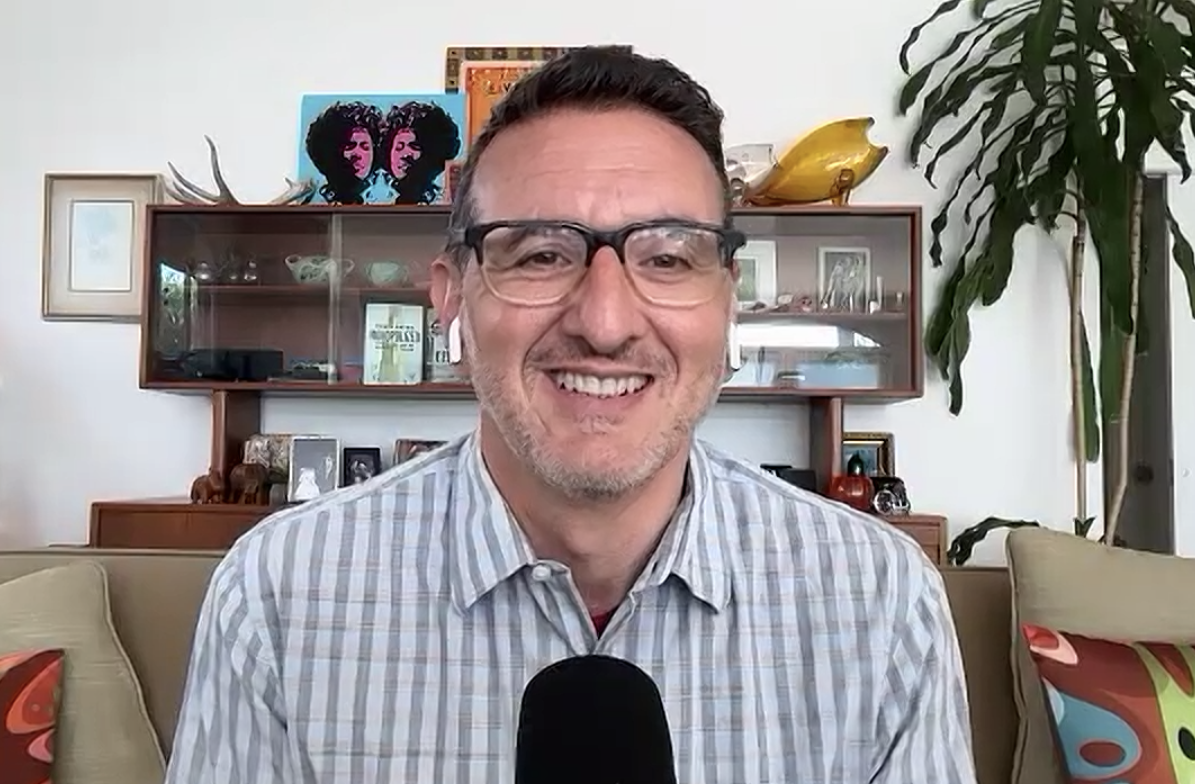
- Dayen in 2025
- Born: February 12
- Occupation: Executive Editor of The American Prospect
- Notable work: Chain of Title: How Three Ordinary Americans Uncovered Wall Street’s Great Foreclosure Fraud (2016)

David Dayen is an American journalist and author. He is the executive editor of The American Prospect.

== Early life and education ==
Dayen grew up in and around Philadelphia. His father worked in the textile industry and his mother was a school teacher and union representative. Dayen had to change schools several times as a child, which sparked an early interest in comedy and joke-writing, as playing the clown made it easier for him to make new friends.

He graduated with a degree in English from the University of Michigan, where he also contributed to a humor magazine. Dayen performed as a stand-up comic well into his thirties. He learned video editing at NFL Films after college. Dayen appeared twice on Jeopardy! in 2003. In his first game, he tied for the win with another contestant; thus, both competed on the next episode as co-champions.

== Career ==
Dayen worked as a television producer and editor for fifteen years, first in Philadelphia, Chicago and San Francisco, then moving to Los Angeles in 2002. He started blogging about politics in 2004 and became an increasingly prominent figure in the progressive Netroots movement.

Dayen has been a contributing writer to Salon.com and The Intercept, a weekly columnist for The New Republic and The Fiscal Times and has also written for The New York Times, Vice, Naked Capitalism, In These Times and other outlets. In 2019, he became the executive editor of The American Prospect. In 2024, he and antitrust researcher Matt Stoller began the spin-off podcast Organized Money.

=== Books ===
In 2016, Dayen published Chain of Title: How Three Ordinary Americans Uncovered Wall Street’s Great Foreclosure Fraud. The book details how Lisa Epstein, an oncology nurse, Michael Redman, a sales manager at a car dealership, and Lynn Szymoniak, an insurance lawyer, teamed up to reveal illegal foreclosure practices at big banks. Frank Partnoy, reviewing the book in The New York Times, said, "Dayen skillfully narrates a slow reveal and sprinkles in some lively metaphors. [...] But this book is noteworthy for a more fundamental reason. [...] Banks took advantage of the fact that nobody knew who owned what. And their eagerness to cut corners precluded an idea that could have saved millions of Americans from foreclosure."

In 2020, Dayen published Monopolized: Life in the Age of Corporate Power (2020), on the way monopolies define everyday life, presenting examples from different industries. Bryce Covert, reviewing the book in The Nation, said, "Dayen shows [that] monopolies make it harder for workers to wield power when there are fewer and fewer employers to choose from. They make the economy less dynamic and innovative. They make society less equal, and by amassing so many resources, they are able to amass power to protect those resources. [...] As Dayen convincingly shows, monopolies are so interwoven in our economy and our lives that there is no escape from them." Kirkus Reviews called the book "A powerful, necessary call to arms to strengthen the antitrust movement and fight a system whose goal is complete control."

== Awards and honors ==
- In 2021, Dayen won the Hillman Prize for excellence in magazine journalism
- His book Chain of Title is the winner of the Studs and Ida Terkel Prize.

== Works ==
- Chain of Title: How Three Ordinary Americans Uncovered Wall Street’s Great Foreclosure Fraud (2016)
- Monopolized: Life in the Age of Corporate Power (2020)
