= Charles James (attorney) =

American lawyer and government official

- Born: Charles Albert James; May 2, 1954 (age 72); Newark, New Jersey, U.S.
- Education: Union High School; Wesleyan University; George Washington University Law School (JD)
- Occupation: Attorney

Charles Albert James (born May 2, 1954) is an American attorney specializing in antitrust law, where he is one of the few African Americans in the field. Since 2010, he has been an adjunct faculty member at Arizona State University. James served as the Assistant Attorney General in charge of the Antitrust Division at the United States Department of Justice from 2001 to 2002.

== Early life and education ==
James was born in Newark, New Jersey, where he attended Union High School. He earned his bachelor's degree from Wesleyan University in 1976 and his J.D. degree from the National Law Center at George Washington University in 1979.

== Career ==
From 1979 to 1985, James worked for the Federal Trade Commission, serving as Assistant to the Director of the FTC's Bureau of Competition from 1983 to 1985. He entered private practice in 1985, joining Jones, Day, Reavis & Pogue. He returned to the federal government in 1989 during the George H. W. Bush administration, serving as Deputy Assistant Attorney General at the Antitrust Division. He served as Acting Assistant Attorney General for several months in 1992. James returned to Jones Day in 1992, where he practiced law until his confirmation as Assistant Attorney General on June 14, 2001.

In 2002, James re-entered private practice, serving as vice president and general counsel of Chevron-Texaco. He was made executive vice president in 2009. He retired in 2010, joining the Sandra Day O'Connor College of Law at ASU as an adjunct professor specializing in antitrust.
