= Ward Edwards =

American psychologist (1927–2005)

- Born: April 5, 1927; Morristown, New Jersey, U.S.
- Died: February 1, 2005 (aged 77); Glendale, California, U.S.
- Education: Swarthmore College (BA), Harvard University (MA, PhD)
- Known for: behavioral decision theory
- Father: Corwin Edwards
- Scientific career
- Workplaces: U.S. Air Force; University of Michigan; University of Southern California
- Thesis: Probability preferences in gambling behavior (1952)
- Doctoral advisors: John G. Beebe-Center, Edwin Boring, Frederick Mosteller

Ward Dennis Edwards (April 5, 1927 – February 1, 2005) was an American psychologist who is a pioneer of behavioral decision theory. He is known for his work on decision theory and formulation and revision of beliefs.

== Biography ==
=== Childhood ===
Edwards was born in Morristown, New Jersey. His father, Corwin D. Edwards was an economist. His mother was Jane Morris Ward. Due to his father's job, his family moved twice during his childhood first to Woodbury, Connecticut, and then to Washington D.C.

=== Education and career ===
After serving in the U.S. Navy from 1945-1946, Edwards earned his BA in psychology from Swarthmore College in 1947. Edward earned both an M.A. in psychology (1950) and a PhD in psychology (1952) from Harvard University. Edwards' major interests in graduate school were psychophysics which later became known as experimental psychology, and probability.

Following his time at the University of Michigan, Edwards came to the University of Southern California in 1973 and worked there until 1995, when he retired.

== Awards ==
- Frank P. Ramsey Award from the Decision Analysis Society, 1988
- Distinguished Scientific Contributions Award in Applied Psychology, American Psychological Association 1996
- 2004 class of Fellows of the Institute for Operations Research and the Management Sciences

"The Association for Psychological Science named Ward Edwards as a James McKeen Cattell Fellow in recognition of his sustained and seminal contributions to the technology of decision making and to behavioral decision theory", James McKeen Cattell Fellow Award, 1995.

== Research ==
Edwards published more than one hundred journal articles and books, including, Decision Analysis and Behavioral Research and Utility Theories: Measurement and Applications. In the introduction to a festschrift for Edwards, Barbara Mellers states,

Decision Science and Technology is a compilation of chapters written in honor of a remarkable man, Ward Edwards. Among Ward's many contributions are two significant accomplishments, either of which would have been enough for a very distinguished career. First, Ward is the founder of behavioral decision theory. This interdisciplinary discipline addresses the question of how people actually confront decisions, as opposed to the question of how they should make decisions. Second, Ward laid the groundwork for sound normative systems by noticing which tasks humans can do well and which tasks computers should perform.

In 1962, Edwards founded the Bayesian Research Conference with the aim to incorporate and apply Bayesian statistical methods and ideas to decision theory. This conference was renamed the "Edwards Bayesian Research Conference," in his honor, in 2005. In the field of statistics, he is well known as lead author of the review article "Bayesian Statistical Inference for Psychological Research," which introduced the notion of 'stable estimation,' and was the first to note that a p-value of 0.05 in the normal linear model corresponded to a lower bound on the Bayes factor of 0.26.
