= Matt Stoller =

American political commentator (born 1978)

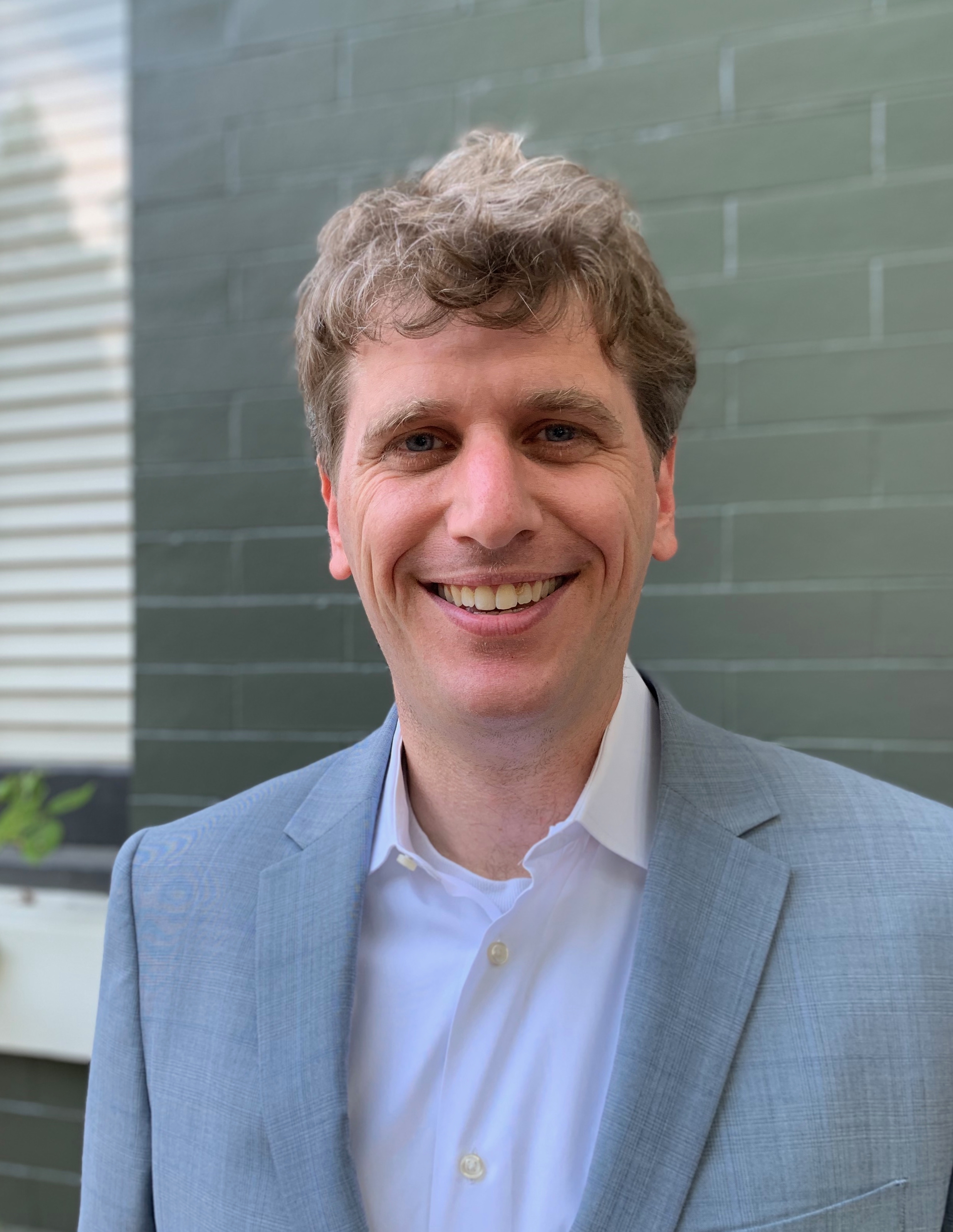
- Stoller in 2019
- Born: February 8, 1978 (age 48); London, England
- Education: Harvard University (BA)
- Occupations: Political commentator; author

Matthew Stoller (born February 8, 1978) is an American political commentator and author. He is the research director of the American Economic Liberties Project.

== Early life and education ==
Stoller was born in London and grew up in Miami, Florida, with his brother Nicholas Stoller, a filmmaker. His mother, Phyllis, is a travel tour operator, and his father, Eric C. Stoller, is a bank executive.

Stoller attended St. Paul's School and then graduated with a BA in history from Harvard College in 2000.

== Career ==
After college, Stoller worked at a software startup in Massachusetts. During this time he started blogging about politics in the lead up to the 2003 Iraq War. He sided with Democratic war hawks in supporting the invasion. After the basis of the war was shown to be rooted in false premises and those who promoted it would face no consequences, he grew depressed and felt that he had "endorsed mass murder". In 2008, he started working as a member of the staff of congressman Alan Grayson, where he worked on policies involving Federal Reserve transparency and foreclosures.

Stoller was a producer for The Dylan Ratigan Show on MSNBC. Stoller then moved to Los Angeles to work as a writer and actor for the first season of the television series Brand X with Russell Brand. He acted as Brand's sidekick, bringing up subjects which were then remarked upon by Brand.

Starting in 2015, Stoller was a Senior Policy Advisor and Budget Analyst for the Senate Budget Committee.

In 2016, Stoller began working for Open Markets, a group embedded in the think tank New America. At Open Markets, he "researched the history of the relationship between concentrated financial power and the Democratic party in the 20th century". In 2017, Open Markets posted a statement in support of a 4 billion Euro fine given by European regulators to Google and extolling American officials to do similarly. The group was asked to leave New America shortly afterwards. In 2020, Stoller and some other members of Open Markets created their own organization, the American Economic Liberties Project. The organization is nonpartisan and does not take corporate money.

In 2019, Stoller published the book Goliath: The 100-Year War Between Monopoly Power and Democracy, a history of United States economic policy. It begins with the rise of anti-monopoly policy, including the 1916 appointment of Louis Brandeis to the Supreme Court, then regulation and antitrust action under the New Deal, to the anti-regulation economists of the Chicago School, the dismantlement of antitrust and financial regulations which have resulted in the business monopolies seen today. The book was described by Politico as the "foundational historical text for a movement coming to be known as the New Brandeisian School". The movement takes inspiration from Louis Brandeis who was a prominent anti-monopolist. Brandeis believed that antitrust action should prevent any one company from maintaining too much power over the economy because monopolies were harmful to innovation, business vitality, and the welfare of workers.

To help promote his book and ideas, Stoller started a newsletter titled Big. As of 2023, it has around 85,000 subscribers. In 2024, he and The American Prospect executive editor David Dayen began a spin-off podcast titled Organized Money.

Stoller defended Graham Platner, the U.S Senate candidate from Maine, after Platner was initially accused of threatening an ex-girlfriend. Stoller praised Platner as "a rejection of Dem HR lady politics." Following criticism of this comment, Stoller said he was arguing against “authoritarian corporate officers.” When Platner was subsequently accused of rape, Stoller wrote "The genocide in Gaza, and the oligarchy supporting it, are great moral sins for which we must all take responsibility. The messy personal life of Graham Platner is not."

== Beliefs ==
Stoller is an anti-monopolist. Much of his work centers on advocating for the breakup of monopolies and the promotion of regulated competition. With his work centered on intellectual history and policy rather than elections, he has made allies with members of both parties. He has supported the policies of Democratic Senator Elizabeth Warren and Republican Senator Josh Hawley who, during his time as Missouri Attorney General, was the first state attorney general to sue Google based on antitrust law. In a profile of Stoller, Politico described his "dogmatic" belief that the goal of breaking up monopolies is "so central and so urgent that nearly any other cause or political relationship should be sacrificed in service of it".
