= John H. Shenefield =

American attorney

John Shenefield
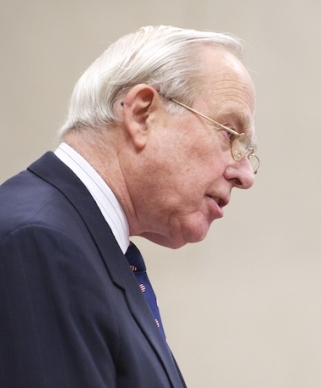
- Shenefield in 2012

United States Associate Attorney General
- In office 1979–1981
- President: Jimmy Carter
- Preceded by: Michael J. Egan
- Succeeded by: Rudy Giuliani

United States Assistant Attorney General for the Antitrust Division
- In office 1977–1979
- President: Jimmy Carter
- Preceded by: Donald I. Baker
- Succeeded by: Sanford Litvack

Personal details
- Born: January 23, 1939 Toledo, Ohio, U.S.
- Died: December 9, 2024 (aged 85)
- Education: Harvard University (AB, LLB)

Military service
- Branch/service: United States Army
- Years of service: 1961–1962

John Hale Shenefield (January 23, 1939 – December 9, 2024) was an American attorney who served as the United States Associate Attorney General from 1979 to 1981 and as the Assistant Attorney General for the Antitrust Division from May 1977 to February 1979.

== Early life and education ==
Shenefield was born in Toledo, Ohio. He earned a Bachelor of Arts degree from Harvard College and a Bachelor of Laws from Harvard Law School. He served in the United States Army in 1961 and 1962.

== Career ==
After graduating from law school, Shenefield practiced antitrust law at Hunton & Williams in Richmond, Virginia for 12 years. He also worked as an economics professor at the University of Richmond. From May 1977 to February 1979, he served as the Assistant Attorney General for the Antitrust Division. He then served as the United States Associate Attorney General from 1979 to 1981. After the end of the Carter administration, Shenefield became a partner at Morgan, Lewis & Bockius, where he served as chair from 1996 – 1999, retiring in 2008.
