= The American Prospect =

American liberal policy magazine

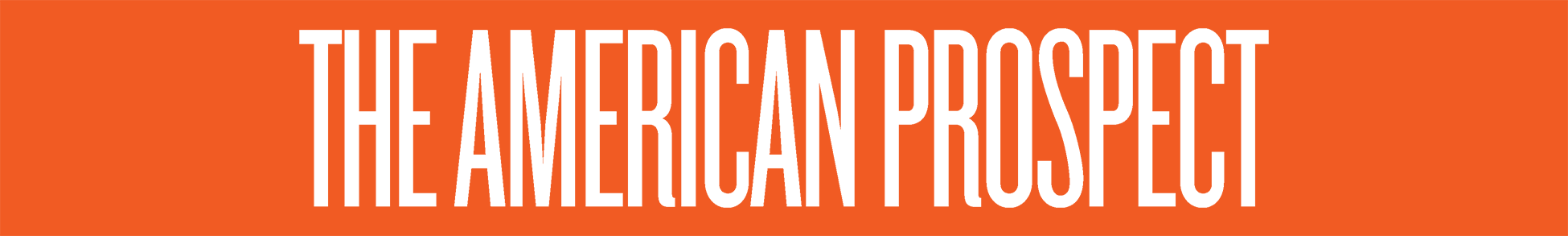

- Cover of the February 1, 2006, edition
- Executive editor: David Dayen
- Categories: U.S. politics and public policy
- Frequency: Bimonthly
- Founded: 1990; 36 years ago
- Company: The American Prospect, Inc.
- Country: United States
- Based in: Washington, D.C., U.S.
- Language: American English
- Website: prospect.org
- ISSN: 1049-7285

The American Prospect is a daily online and bimonthly print American political and public policy magazine dedicated to American modern liberalism and progressivism. Based in Washington, D.C., The American Prospect says it "is devoted to promoting informed discussion on public policy from a progressive perspective". Its motto is "Ideas, Politics, and Power".

== History ==
Initially called The Liberal Prospect, the magazine was founded in 1990 by Robert Kuttner, Robert Reich, and Paul Starr as a response to the perceived ascendancy of conservatism in the 1980s. Kuttner and Starr serve as co-editors. As of December 2024, David Dayen serves as executive editor and Mitch Grummon serves as publisher. Ganesh Sitaraman chairs the board of directors.

Other editors include managing editor Ryan Cooper, co-founder and co-editor Robert Kuttner, editor-at-large, co-founder, and co-editor Paul Starr, deputy editor Gabrielle Gurley, associate editor Susanna Beiser, and investigations editor Maureen Tkacik. Michael Tomasky was executive editor and remains a contributing editor.

Staff writers and contributors have included Gabriel Arana, Steve Erickson, Adele Stan, Paul Waldman, and EJ Dionne. Other notable contributors to The Prospect's print and online magazine include author David Garrow and Harvard Law professor Randall Kennedy. Eric Alterman served as the main media criticism and history columnist from 2021 to 2023, when he was replaced by Rick Perlstein, who served through 2024.

The Prospect has several programs to focus on the development of the next generation of progressive writers and journalists. Its internship program counts among its alumni Bernie Sanders advisor Matt Duss. Former Prospect intern Shera Avi-Yonah was awarded a Rhodes Scholarship in 2021. Its writing fellowship program enables young writers to develop their skills under an intensive mentoring program that is widely regarded as one of the foremost springboards to fulfilling careers in journalism and the academy. Alumni include Ezra Klein, Matt Yglesias, Jamelle Bouie, Adam Serwer, Chris Mooney, Joshua Micah Marshall, Dana Goldstein, Nicholas Confessore, Alexander Sammon, and Kate Sheppard.

In March 2010, The American Prospect entered into an affiliation with Demos, a public policy research and advocacy center based in New York City. The official affiliation ended in 2012. That year, the magazine nearly folded due to financial struggles, but raised enough money to stay afloat. In 2014, the magazine repurposed itself as a "quarterly journal of ideas". Kit Rachlis announced he was leaving the editorship of the magazine, senior writer Monica Potts and editor Bob Moser were laid off, and several other editorial staffers left the publication.

In 2019, The Prospect celebrated its 30th anniversary. At the anniversary gala, Kuttner said, "The Prospect has been all about connecting dots—between the structural corruptions of capitalism, the deep analysis of how that operates politically, the narrative story of how regular people experience it, the related corruption of our democracy, and the movement politics of taking America back."

Executive editor David Dayen introduced a new motto for The Prospect: "Ideas, Politics, and Power". Dayen reported extensively on the COVID-19 pandemic in his daily newsletters, Unsanitized and First 100, and pointed The Prospect coverage toward Washington insider knowledge, including series such as "Cabinet Watch", which broke news of several of Joe Biden's high-profile cabinet appointments.

In 2020, The Prospect introduced its flagship "Day One Agenda" series, outlining the ways in which then President-elect Biden could use executive power to implement progressive policy. Reporting from the series has been cited in Vox, Salon, and The Washington Post.

As of 2020, The Prospect partners with news organizations including The Intercept and Dissent Magazine.

== Accolades, awards, and recognition ==
In 2010, The American Prospect was the recipient of Utne Reader magazine's Utne Independent Press Award for Political Coverage. In 2017, then-Prospect columnist Adele M. Stan won the Hillman Prize for Opinion and Analysis Journalism. Her reporting on the American far right predicted Donald Trump's presidency. The committee wrote of Stan's work: "Stan's prescient 2016 portfolio stands as a chilling testimony to fearless commentary, and signals the changes we need in public life and in journalism to preserve civil liberties and pursue social justice."

In 2021, Dayen won the Hillman Prize in Magazine Journalism for his "Unsanitized" newsletter series.

Also in 2021, Deputy Editor Gabrielle Gurley won the Gene Burd Award for Excellence in Urban Journalism for her article "Public Transportation in Crisis".

Managing Editor Jonathan Guyer won the 2021 Dateline Award for Investigative Journalism (Magazine), recognizing excellence in the category of Investigative Journalism, for his feature "The Lucrative Afterlife of a Trump Official".

== Format ==
Originally, The American Prospect published quarterly, then bimonthly. In 2000, thanks to a grant from the Schumann Center for Media and Democracy, it became biweekly. Financial and logistical difficulties ensued, and the magazine moved to a ten-issue-per-year format in spring 2003 and a bimonthly format in summer 2012. The online version of the magazine included a blog called TAPPED (derived from TAP, the acronym of The American Prospect). Facing financial issues, the magazine reduced its bimonthly publication schedule to a quarterly publication schedule in 2014. Starting in 2020, the magazine returned to a bimonthly schedule.

The Prospect releases periodic special issues, including "The Green New Deal" (November 2019), "Caregiving in Crisis" (October 2020), and "The Supply Chain Debacle" (February 2022).

== See also ==
- Association of Alternative Newsmedia
