= Barry C. Lynn =

American writer and journalist

Barry Lynn
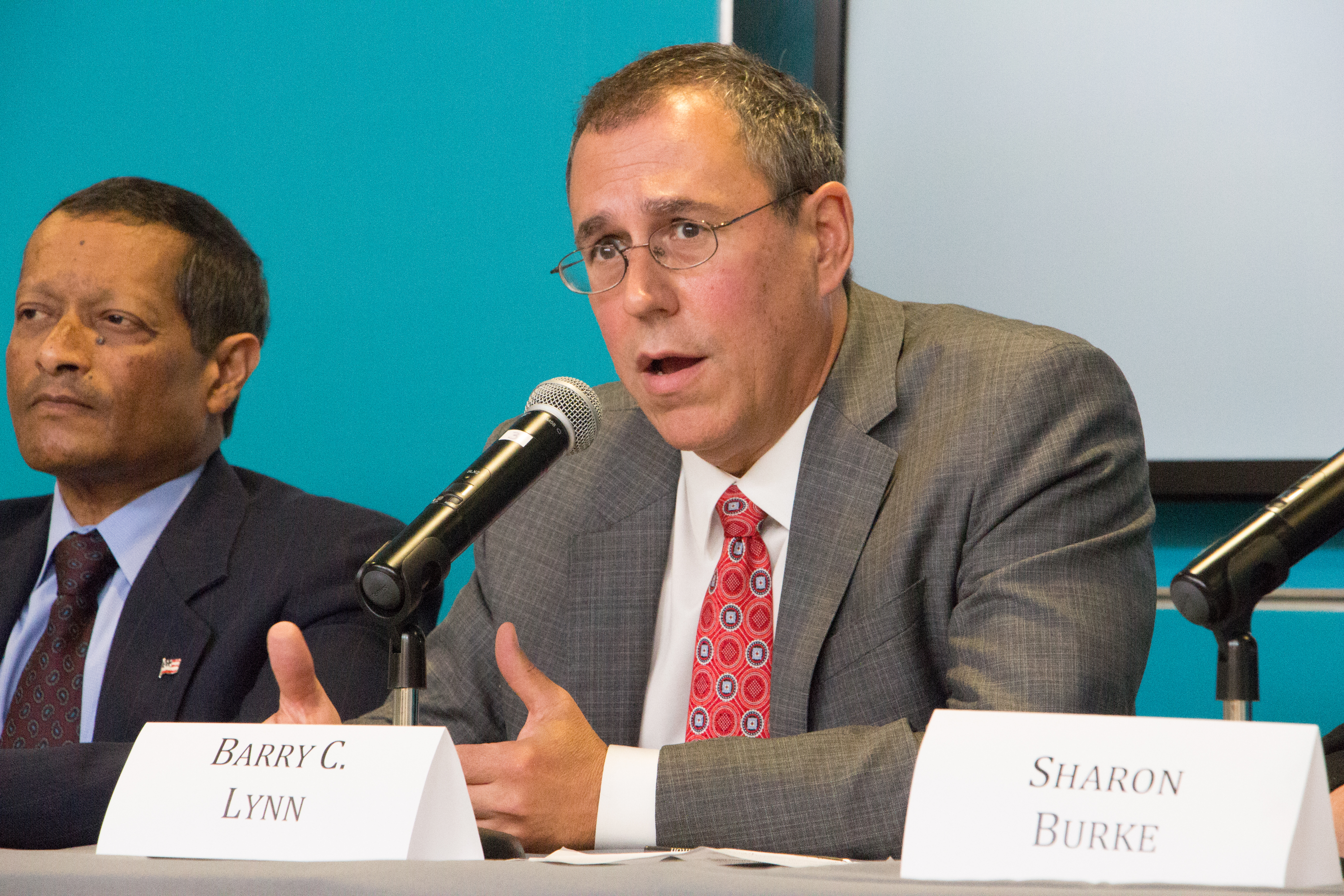
- Lynn at a New America symposium
- Born: Miami, Florida, U.S.
- Education: Columbia University (BA)
- Occupations: Journalist, writer

Barry C. Lynn is a liberal American journalist and writer. He was a senior fellow at the New America Foundation think tank in Washington, D.C., directing the Open Markets Program. The program was shut down, allegedly for criticizing Google, one of New America's chief funders. He has written extensively on globalization, economics, and politics for such publications ranging from The Financial Times and Forbes to Mother Jones and the Harvard Business Review.

== Biography ==
Lynn was born in Miami, and is a graduate of Columbia University. He has been a reporter for the Associated Press and Agence France-Presse and worked as a correspondent in Peru, Venezuela, and the Caribbean. Prior to joining New America in 2001, he was the executive editor of Global Business, a monthly magazine targeted at the managers of multi-national enterprises. He has also worked in factories, construction, landscaping, retail, furniture moving, and as a truck driver. He lives in Washington with his wife and two sons.

== Work ==
Lynn has written extensively on the potential risks of unfettered globalization and industrial interdependence. In End of the Line, he proposes that a deeply interconnected global industrial system undermines safety and freedom. His work argues how the relentless quest for efficiency, and practices like outsourcing to a single factory and "just-in-time" production, could create an increasingly fragile system, where one isolated shock could crash entire industries.

Lynn’s work also focuses on the effects of extreme concentration of political-economic power. In Cornered, he argues that radical consolidation has birthed present-day monopolies that dominate and control virtually every major industry in America. He argues that these new monopolies are squelching innovation, degrading product quality and safety, and destabilizing vital industrial and financial systems. His work argues that from the American Revolution to the Second New Deal, Americans traditionally resisted concentration of power and believed that its distribution is critical for freedom and democracy. He argues that the US must revive its antitrust laws to recover real open markets, resilient systems, and liberty.

He was a senior fellow at the New America Foundation think tank in Washington, D.C., where he directed the Open Markets Program.

In August 2017, Lynn was fired, and the Open Markets Program was terminated by Anne-Marie Slaughter, the president and CEO of New America Foundation. A New York Times investigation revealed that pressure from Google led to his ousting. The emails sent by Slaughter "clearly show the influence that Google wields over New America’s operations," stated the Open Markets team in a statement provided to The Intercept. A collective letter signed by 25 New America’s former and current fellows, including prominent journalists such as George Packer of The New Yorker and notable scholars such as Evgeny Morozov of Harvard University was delivered to Anne-Marie Slaughter and New America’s directors. The letter argued that Slaughter's handling of the situation had damaged the think tank’s reputation.

Lynn has moved the team of researchers and advocates that had been with him at New America, and has created an independent nonprofit organization, the Open Markets Institute.

== Publications ==
=== Books ===
- Barry C. Lynn, End of the Line: The Rise and Coming Fall of the Global Corporation, New York, Doubleday, 2005 ISBN 0-385-51024-1
- Barry C. Lynn, Cornered: The New Monopoly Capitalism and the Economics of Destruction, Hoboken, John Wiley & Sons, 2010 ISBN 0-470-18638-0
- Barry C. Lynn, Liberty from All Masters: The New American Autocracy vs. the Will of the People, New York, St. Martin's Press, 2020 ISBN 9781250240620

=== Articles ===
- Barry C. Lynn, "The fragility that threatens the world's industrial systems" , Financial Times, October 15, 2005
- Barry C. Lynn, "Wake up to the old-fashioned power of the new oligopolies" , Financial Times, February 14, 2006
- Barry C. Lynn, "Save globalisation from radical global utopians" , Financial Times, May 29, 2006
- Barry C. Lynn, "Breaking the chain: The antitrust case against Wal-Mart" , Harper's Magazine, July 2006
- Barry C. Lynn, "Rules That Wilt the Free Market in British Groceries" , Financial Times, April 5, 2007
- Barry C. Lynn, "How Detroit Went Bottom-Up" , The American Prospect, September 19, 2009
- Barry C. Lynn, "Corporate giants have too much power" , CNN, February 16, 2010
- Barry C. Lynn, "Let's Put Mom and Pop Back in Business" , Washington Post, February 21, 2010
- Barry C. Lynn, "Who Broke America's Jobs Machine?" (co-authored with Phillip Longman) , Washington Monthly, March/April 2010
- Barry C. Lynn, "The Real Enemy of Unions" , Washington Monthly, May/June 2011
- Barry C. Lynn, "No Free Parking for Monopoly Players: Time to Revive Anti-Trust Law" , The Nation, June 8, 2011
- Barry C. Lynn, "The New China Syndrome" , Harper's Magazine, November 2015
