= Thurman Arnold =

American judge

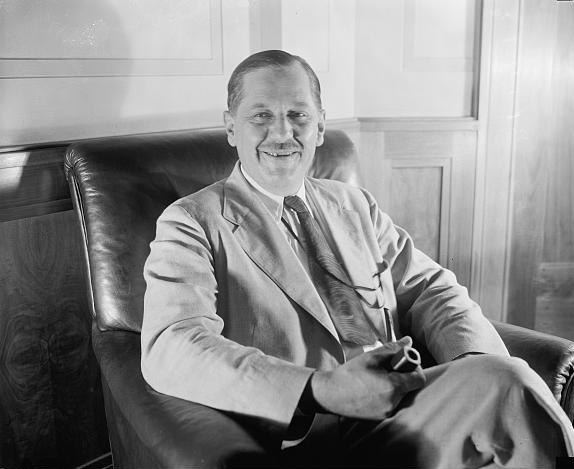
- Arnold in 1939

Judge of the United States Court of Appeals for the District of Columbia
- In office March 18, 1943 – July 9, 1945
- Appointed by: Franklin D. Roosevelt
- Preceded by: Wiley Rutledge
- Succeeded by: Bennett Champ Clark

United States Assistant Attorney General for the Antitrust Division
- In office 1938–1943
- President: Franklin D. Roosevelt
- Preceded by: Robert H. Jackson
- Succeeded by: Wendell Berge

Personal details
- Born: Thurman Wesley Arnold; June 2, 1891 Laramie, Wyoming, U.S.
- Died: November 7, 1969 (aged 78) Alexandria, Virginia, U.S.
- Education: Princeton University (AB); Harvard University (LLB)

Thurman Wesley Arnold (June 2, 1891 – November 7, 1969) was an American lawyer best known for his trust-busting campaign as Assistant Attorney General in charge of the Antitrust Division in President Franklin D. Roosevelt's Department of Justice from 1938 to 1943. He later served as a Judge on the United States Court of Appeals for the District of Columbia. Before coming to Washington in 1938, Arnold was the mayor of Laramie, Wyoming and a professor at Yale Law School, where he took part in the legal realism movement and published two books: The Symbols of Government (1935) and The Folklore of Capitalism (1937). He also published The Bottlenecks of Business (1940).

== Early life and education ==
Thurman was born in the frontier ranch town of Laramie, Wyoming, which grew to be a small city and the location of the University of Wyoming. He was the son of Annie (Brockway) and Constantine Peter Arnold. He began his university studies at Wabash College, but transferred to Princeton University, earning his Bachelor of Arts degree in 1911. He earned his Bachelor of Laws from Harvard Law School in 1914.

== Early career ==
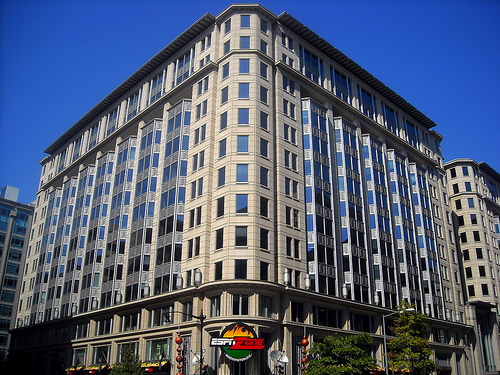
Thurman Arnold Building in Washington, D.C.

Arnold served in World War I, rising to the rank of lieutenant in the United States Army (Field Artillery) and worked briefly in Chicago, Illinois before returning to Laramie, where he was a member of the Wyoming House of Representatives in 1921 and then mayor from 1923 to 1924. He developed a reputation as a maverick lawyer. He was a Lecturer at the University of Wyoming from 1921 to 1926. He was Dean of the West Virginia University College of Law from 1927 to 1930. He was a visiting professor at Yale University from 1930 to 1931, and then professor of law at the same institution from 1931 to 1938.

== Federal government ==
Arnold was a special assistant to the general counsel of the Agricultural Adjustment Administration in 1933. He was an Assistant Attorney General of the United States Department of Justice from 1938 to 1943. As chief competition lawyer for the United States Government, Arnold launched numerous studies to support the antitrust efforts in the late 1930s. He targeted the American Medical Association in their anti-competitive efforts against health plans. The Roosevelt administration later de-emphasized antitrust enforcement, for the stated purpose of allowing corporations to concentrate on contributing to victory in World War II.

== Federal judicial service ==
Arnold was nominated by President Franklin D. Roosevelt on February 11, 1943, to an Associate Justice seat on the United States Court of Appeals for the District of Columbia (now the United States Court of Appeals for the District of Columbia Circuit) vacated by Associate Justice Wiley Blount Rutledge. He was "kicked upstairs" by President Roosevelt to the Court of Appeals to get him out of the Antitrust Division. He was confirmed by the United States Senate on March 9, 1943, and received his commission on March 11, 1943. His service terminated on July 9, 1945, due to his resignation.

=== Court of Appeals tenure ===
Although the District of Columbia Court of Appeals had some responsibility for review of decisions by federal administrative agencies, during Arnold's tenure the court's primary role was reviewing decisions of local trial courts involving routine civil and criminal matters arising in Washington, D.C. Arnold was never happy during his time on the court, resigning after only two years on the bench. As an explanation of his decision, he told observers he "would rather be speaking to damn fools than listening to damn fools."

== Arnold & Porter ==
Arnold returned to private practice in Washington, D.C., where, along with Paul A. Porter and Abe Fortas, he co-founded the law firm known today as Arnold & Porter.

== Personal and death ==
Thurman married his lifelong partner Frances Longan Arnold on September 4, 1917. They had two children, Thurman Jr. and George, both of whom enjoyed successful careers in the law. Nebraskan "Hugh Cox, famous as Thurman Arnold's chief deputy" and also as an early partner at Root Clark & Bird (later Root, Clark, Buckner & Ballantine; later Dewey Ballantine, later Dewey & LeBouef) was attorney for Donald Hiss, brother of Alger Hiss. Both Cox and Hiss were partners at Covington & Burling, where he was called the "perfect advocate") during the Hiss-Chambers Case."

Arnold died on November 7, 1969, at his home in Alexandria, Virginia.

Thurman Arnold Jr. established a law firm in Palm Springs, California in 1953. Thurman Arnold Jr.'s son, Thurman Arnold III, joined his father's law firm in 1982 and is currently practicing law with an emphasis on Family Law in Palm Springs, California. George Arnold married and raised a family with Ellen Cameron Pearson, daughter of columnist Drew Pearson and granddaughter of Cissy Patterson, owner of the Washington Times-Herald.

== Sources ==
=== Biographical sources ===
- Arnold, Thurman (1965). Fair Fights and Foul; a Dissenting Lawyer's Life. New York: Harcourt, Brace & World – via Internet Archive.
- Arnold, Thurman (1977). Gressley, Gene M. (ed.). Voltaire and the Cowboy: The Letters of Thurman Arnold. Boulder: Colorado Association University Press. ISBN 0-87081-073-1 – via Internet Archive.
- Gressley, Gene M. (1964). "Thurman Arnold, Antitrust, and the New Deal". The Business History Review. 38 (2): 214–231. doi:10.2307/3112073. JSTOR 3112073. S2CID 154882053.
- Miscamble, Wilson D. (1982). "Thurman Arnold Goes to Washington: A Look at Antitrust Policy in the Later New Deal". The Business History Review. 56 (1): 1–15. doi:10.2307/3114972. JSTOR 3114972. S2CID 146308352.
- Waller, Spencer Weber (2005). Thurman Arnold: A Biography. New York: New York University Press. ISBN 0-8147-9392-4.

=== Primary sources ===
- Arnold, Thurman W. The Bottlenecks of Business. New York: Reynal & Hitchcock, 1940. ISBN 1-58798-085-1
- Arnold, Thurman W. (1937). The Folklore of Capitalism. New Haven: Yale University Press – via Internet Archive. London: Humphrey Milford/Oxford University Press, 1962, with new preface. ISBN 1-58798-025-8
- Arnold, Thurman W. (1935). The Symbols of Government. New Haven: Yale University Press – via Internet Archive. New York: Harcourt, Brace & World, 1962, with new preface. ISBN 9780156876063

Legal offices
Preceded by Wiley Blount Rutledge	Associate Justice of the United States Court of Appeals for the District of Columbia; 1943–1945	Succeeded by Bennett Champ Clark
