= United States Department of Justice Antitrust Division =

American anti-monopoly government bureau

- Seal of the United States Department of Justice

Division overview
- Formed: 1919; 107 years ago
- Jurisdiction: Federal government of the United States
- Headquarters: Robert F. Kennedy Department of Justice Building 950 Pennsylvania Avenue NW Washington, D.C., United States
- Division executive: Assistant Attorney General
- Parent department: U.S. Department of Justice
- Website: justice.gov/atr

The United States Department of Justice Antitrust Division is the division of the United States Department of Justice that enforces U.S. antitrust law. It shares authority with the Federal Trade Commission (FTC) for enforcing civil antitrust law under the Sherman Act and Clayton Act. It also has exclusive authority to enforce criminal antitrust law under the Sherman Act.

== History ==
=== Early years ===
On February 25, 1903, Congress earmarked $500,000 for antitrust enforcement. On March 3, 1903, Congress created the position of Antitrust Attorney General, with a salary to be paid out of the funds earmarked for antitrust enforcement. The 1904 DOJ Register identified two professional staffers responsible for enforcement of antitrust laws, but the Division was not formally established until 1919.

Attorney General A. Mitchell Palmer “effected the first important reorganization" of DOJ since it was first established in 1870. Palmer organized DOJ into divisions, and placed the assistant attorney general “in charge of the Anti-Trust Division.” Palmer's annual report for the fiscal year ending June 30, 1919 contained the first public statement that DOJ had a component called the "Antitrust Division."

=== 2013 closure of field offices ===
The closure of four of the Antitrust Division's criminal antitrust offices in January 2013 generated significant controversy within the Division and among members of Congress. The Attorney General posited that the closure of these offices would save money and not negatively affect criminal enforcement.

A significant number of career prosecutors voiced contrary opinions, noting that the elimination of half of the Division's criminal enforcement offices would increase travel expenses and diminish the likelihood of uncovering local or regional conspiracies.

== Leadership ==
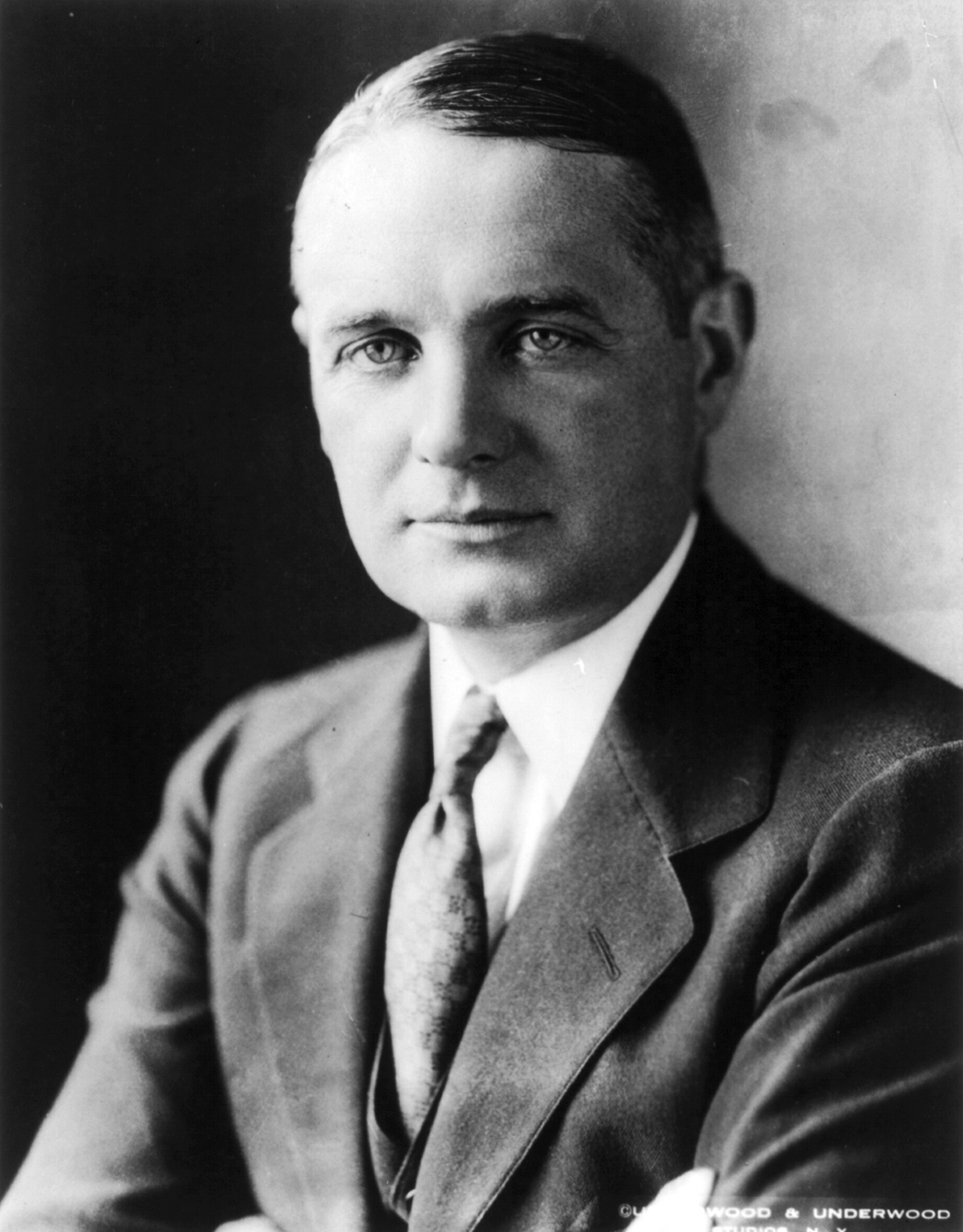
First Assistant Attorney General for Antitrust William J. Donovan

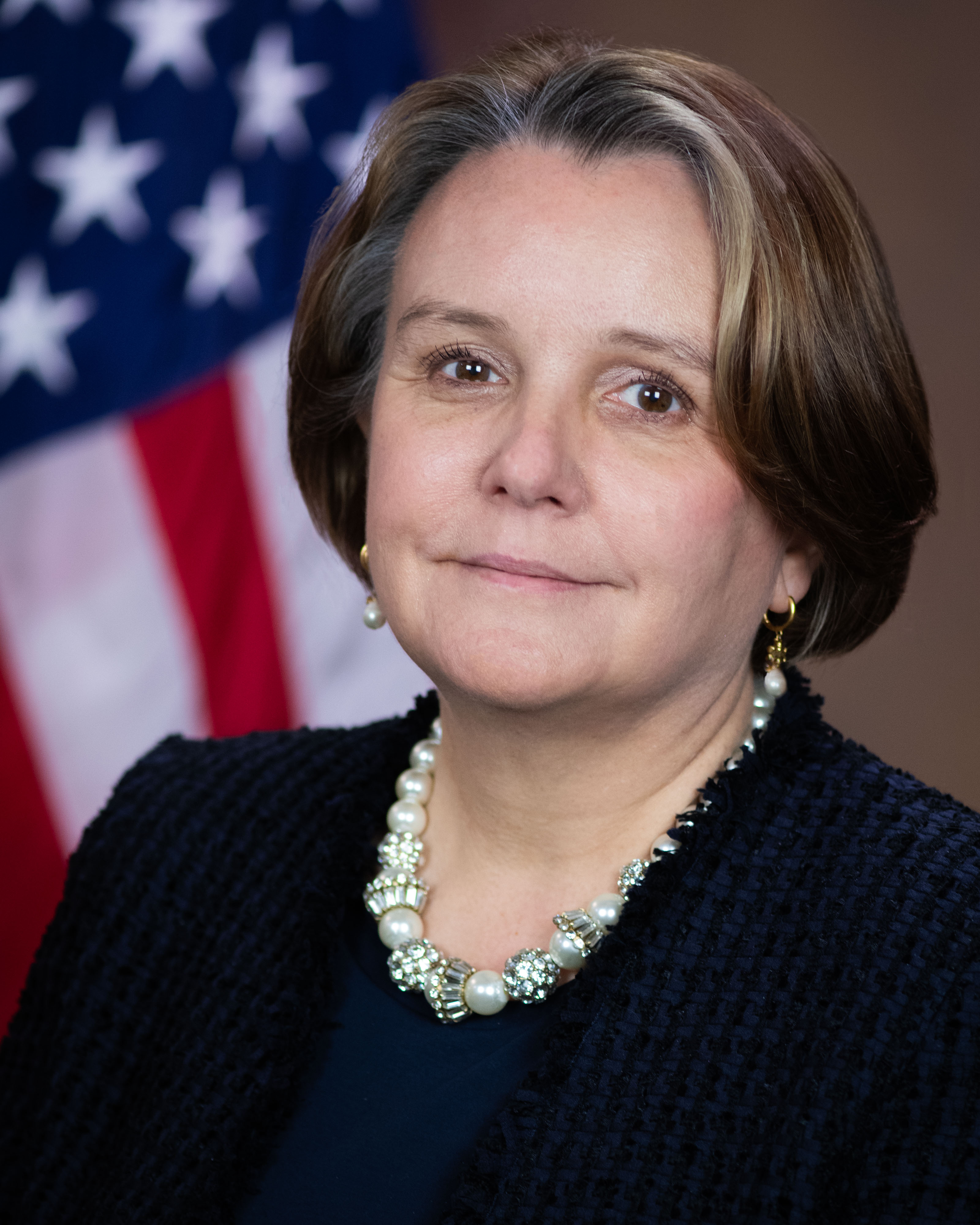
Current Assistant Attorney General for Antitrust Gail Slater

The Antitrust Division is led by an assistant attorney general (AAG) who is appointed by the president of the United States with the advice and consent of the Senate. The Antitrust Division's AAG reports to the associate attorney general and the deputy attorney general. The current assistant attorney general for the Antitrust Division is Gail Slater.

=== List of Assistant Attorneys General for the Antitrust Division ===
| Name | Years of service | Appointed by |
|---|---|---|
| William Joseph Donovan | 1926–1927 | Calvin Coolidge |
| John Lord O'Brian | 1929–1933 | Herbert Hoover |
| Robert H. Jackson | 1937–1938 | Franklin D. Roosevelt |
| Thurman Arnold | 1938–1943 | Franklin D. Roosevelt |
| Wendell Berge | 1943–1947 | Franklin D. Roosevelt |
| John F. Sonnett | 1947–1948 | Harry S. Truman |
| Herbert Bergson | 1948–1950 | Harry S. Truman |
| Leonard Bessman | 1950–1951 | Harry S. Truman |
| H. Graham Morison | 1951–1952 | Harry S. Truman |
| Newell A. Clapp (acting) | 1952–1953 | Harry S. Truman |
| Stanley Barnes | 1953–1956 | Dwight D. Eisenhower |
| Victor R. Hansen | 1956–1959 | Dwight D. Eisenhower |
| Robert A. Bicks | 1959–1961 | Dwight D. Eisenhower |
| Lee Loevinger | 1961–1963 | John F. Kennedy |
| William Horsley Orrick, Jr. | 1963–1965 | John F. Kennedy |
| Donald F. Turner | 1965–1968 | Lyndon B. Johnson |
| Edwin Zimmerman | 1968–1969 | Lyndon B. Johnson |
| Richard W. McLaren | 1969–1972 | Richard Nixon |
| Walker B. Comegys (acting) | 1972 | Acting |
| Thomas E. Kauper | 1972–1976 | Richard Nixon |
| Donald I. Baker | 1976–1977 | Gerald Ford |
| John H. Shenefield | 1977–1979 | Jimmy Carter |
| Sanford Litvack | 1979–1981 | Jimmy Carter |
| William Baxter | 1981–1983 | Ronald Reagan |
| J. Paul McGrath | 1983–1985 | Ronald Reagan |
| Douglas H. Ginsburg | 1985–1986 | Ronald Reagan |
| Charles Rule | 1986–1989 | Ronald Reagan |
| James F. Rill | 1989–1992 | George H. W. Bush |
| Charles James (acting) | 1992 | Acting |
| J. Mark Gidley (acting) | 1992–1993 | Acting |
| Anne Bingaman | 1993–1996 | Bill Clinton |
| Joel Klein | 1996–2000 | Bill Clinton |
| Douglas Melamed (acting) | 2000–2001 | Acting |
| Charles James | 2001–2003 | George W. Bush |
| R. Hewitt Pate | 2003–2005 | George W. Bush |
| Thomas O. Barnett | 2005–2008 | George W. Bush |
| Deborah A. Garza (acting) | 2008–2009 | Acting |
| Christine A. Varney | 2009–2011 | Barack Obama |
| Sharis Pozen (acting) | 2011–2012 | Acting |
| Joseph F. Wayland (acting) | 2012 | Acting |
| Renata Hesse (acting) | 2012–2013 | Acting |
| William Baer | 2013–2016 | Barack Obama |
| Renata Hesse (acting) | 2016-2017 | Acting |
| Brent C. Snyder (acting) | 2017 | Acting |
| Andrew C. Finch (acting) | 2017 | Acting |
| Makan Delrahim | 2017–2021 | Donald Trump |
| Richard A. Powers (acting) | 2021 | Acting |
| Jonathan Kanter | 2021–2024 | Joe Biden |
| Doha Mekki | 2024-2025 | Acting |
| Omeed Assefi (acting) | 2025 | Acting |
| Gail Slater | 2025–2026 | Donald Trump |
| Omeed Assefi | 2026 | Acting |

== Current organizational structure ==
The Assistant Attorney General is assisted by Deputy Assistant Attorneys General (DAAG). One of the DAAGs holds the position of "Principal Deputy," that is "first among equals," and "will typically assume the powers of the Assistant Attorney General in the Assistant Attorney General's absence."

As of January 24, 2025, the Antitrust Division consists of these sections and offices:

=== Office of the Assistant Attorney General ===
- Assistant Attorney General
- Deputy Assistant Attorneys General
- Chief of Staff and Senior Advisors
- Directors of Enforcement
- Office of the Chief Legal Advisor

=== Civil Enforcement Program ===
- Anti-Monopoly and Collusion Enforcement Section
- Defense, Industrials, and Aerospace Section
- Financial Services, Fintech, and Banking Section
- Healthcare and Consumer Products Section
- Media, Entertainment, and Communications Section
- Technology and Digital Platforms Section
- Transportation, Energy, and Agriculture Section

=== Criminal Sections and Offices ===
- Chicago Office (also has civil enforcement responsibilities)
- New York Office
- San Francisco Office (also has civil enforcement responsibilities)
- Washington Criminal Section

=== Expert Analysis Group ===
- Economic Analysis Group

=== Executive Office ===
- Executive Office
- Paralegal Unit

=== Policy and Advocacy Program ===
- Appellate Section
- Competition Policy and Advocacy Section
- International Section
- State Relations

== See also ==
- Competition Bureau (Canadian counterpart)
- Competition policy
- Competition regulator
- Federal Trade Commission
- United States v. Microsoft Corp.
