= Junk fee =

Fees designed to confuse consumers

Junk fees (also known as hidden fees) are fees designed to confuse or deceive consumers by exploiting behavioral biases. They tend to come in the form of mandatory back-end fees and hidden add-on charges, which obscure the true cost of goods and services. Junk fees stand in contrast to "all-in", "upfront" pricing where consumers are shown a true single price, inclusive of fees, at the start of the shopping process. Economist Neale Mahoney criticizes junk fees for "increas[ing] search costs and equilibrium prices, distort[ing] consumer choices, and divert[ing] innovation toward exploitative rather than value-enhancing strategies".

Even in the presence of competition and disclosure, and despite their unpopularity, firms often opt for junk fees because consumers do not consistently punish firms that resort to junk fees. Some firms, such as StubHub, that use junk fees have advocated for regulatory action to impose restrictions on junk fees in order to level the playing field and prevent collective action problems among firms. Delta Air Lines joined other airlines in challenging a rule requiring greater disclosure of passenger fees. Writers at the Cato Institute have argued that restrictions on fees can increase base prices and reduce consumer choice.

Event ticket sellers, such as Ticketmaster, U.S. airline companies, cable television providers, hotels, and restaurants have also been known to use junk fees. Some junk fees are mandatory while others are non-mandatory but shrouded in confusing language that makes consumers think they are mandatory.

Junk fees are distinct from add-on fees that consumers accept through informed choice, such as paying more for a pizza with customized toppings, paying more for a hotel room with a better view, or paying extra for a seat in business class on an airplane.

Regulatory responses have included requirements to display prices inclusive of mandatory fees and limits on particular charges, such as bank fees.

== Examples by industry ==
=== Event ticketing ===
A randomized experiment conducted on StubHub in 2015 found that displaying fees at checkout rather than at the beginning of a search increased average spending per website visitor by about 21%. This reflected both a greater likelihood of purchasing and the selection of more expensive tickets. In May 2025, Ticketmaster announced that it would display ticket prices including mandatory fees upfront, as a United States rule requiring this took effect.

=== Hotels ===
Resort fees are charges added to advertised hotel room rates. In 2023, Marriott International reached an agreement with the Texas attorney general requiring it to display room prices including mandatory fees most prominently and to distinguish its fees from government taxes.

=== Air travel ===
Airline fee disputes have included charges for payment methods. In 2016, Australian consumer organization Choice criticized Qantas's flat A$7 card surcharge on cheaper domestic fares as exceeding estimated transaction costs. Qantas defended its surcharges as recovering costs that included processing and fraud prevention. That year, the airline announced that it would replace flat charges with percentage-based surcharges, saying most customers would pay the same or less.

=== Cable television ===
In 2020, Comcast settled a Minnesota lawsuit alleging that it had charged customers more than promised, including fees omitted from advertised prices. The settlement included US$1.14 million in refunds and debt relief for other customers, and required fuller disclosure of prices, including charges such as broadcast television and regional sports fees.

=== Restaurants and food delivery ===
Restaurant surcharges have included fees described as funding employee benefits. In a 2023 NPR report on added fees, the owner of Rock Elm Tavern in Minnesota explained that its 3% wellness fee helped pay for benefits while allowing the restaurant to advertise competitive menu prices.

In December 2024, the Federal Trade Commission (FTC) and Illinois attorney general announced a US$25 million settlement with Grubhub over allegations that included misleading delivery-price advertising and adding service fees late in the ordering process. The case also concerned driver earnings claims and restaurant listings.

=== Banking ===
In 2023, the Consumer Financial Protection Bureau (CFPB) ordered Bank of America to reimburse customers charged repeated US$35 insufficient-funds fees when merchants resubmitted the same transaction for payment. The bank said it had eliminated insufficient-funds fees in 2022.

=== Car dealerships ===
In April 2026, the FTC and Maryland attorney general announced a proposed settlement with Lindsay Automotive Group over allegations of misleading advertised prices and unwanted add-on products. It provided for customer refunds and a US$3.1 million payment to Maryland, and would require advertised prices to include mandatory charges.

== Regulatory efforts ==
=== United States ===
The Joe Biden presidential administration undertook regulatory efforts to restrict junk fees. In 2023, the Federal Trade Commission (FTC) adopted a rule that would have required auto dealers to disclose the actual up-front price in advertising and promotional materials. This was struck down by the Fifth Circuit Court of Appeals in January 2025.

In 2024, the FTC required upfront pricing in the live-event ticketing and short-term lodging industries. The rule went into effect in May 2025. The rule requires covered businesses to include mandatory fees in the displayed total price; it does not prohibit particular types of fees or set their amounts.

During the second Trump administration, several Biden-era measures were reversed. In April 2025, a federal judge vacated the CFPB rule intended to reduce most credit-card late fees to US$8, following a settlement between the bureau and industry plaintiffs. On 9 May 2025, Trump signed congressional resolutions overturning the CFPB's overdraft rule and its rule extending supervision to large non-bank digital-payment providers. The overdraft rule would have required covered institutions with more than US$10 billion in assets to charge US$5, charge an amount covering costs and losses, or treat overdrafts as credit subject to lending disclosures.

In July 2026, the United States Department of Transportation restored its 2011 standards for disclosure of airline ancillary fees after the Fifth Circuit vacated the more extensive 2024 disclosure rule. The FTC's ticketing and lodging rule nevertheless took effect in 2025, and in 2026 the agency sought public comment on possible additional rules addressing fees in rental housing and online food and grocery delivery.

States have also regulated fee disclosure. California's Senate Bill 478, effective in July 2024, generally requires advertised prices to include mandatory fees, apart from specified taxes and shipping charges. A separate law permits restaurants and certain other food-service businesses to list mandatory fees separately if they disclose them clearly and conspicuously.

In July 2026, Zohran Mamdani's administration proposed a New York City rule requiring upfront disclosure of mandatory fees. The proposal was separate from an adopted rule making subscriptions easier to cancel, scheduled to take effect on 1 October 2026.

=== Canada ===
Amendments to the Competition Act in 2022 expressly addressed drip pricing. The provisions cover advertised prices that cannot be obtained because of fixed mandatory charges, except charges imposed by government on the purchaser, such as sales taxes. In 2023, the Canadian government was reported to be following in the steps of the Biden administration in targeting junk fees.

In September 2024, the Competition Tribunal ordered Cineplex to pay a penalty of approximately C$38.9 million over the way it advertised movie tickets subject to an online booking fee of up to C$1.50. The Federal Court of Appeal upheld the decision in January 2026. Cineplex sought leave to appeal to the Supreme Court of Canada in March 2026.

From 12 March 2026, regulations capped insufficient-funds fees on personal deposit accounts at federally regulated banks at C$10. They also prohibited charging such a fee more than once within two business days on the same account, or when an account was overdrawn by less than C$10.

Changes to the Canadian Radio-television and Telecommunications Commission's Wireless and Internet Codes took effect on 12 June 2026, prohibiting activation and plan-modification fees for customers covered by those codes. Exceptions allow charges for reasonable physical installation costs and optional products or services expressly chosen by the customer.

=== Australia ===
Under the Australian Consumer Law, businesses generally must prominently display a single minimum total price including taxes and unavoidable or preselected charges that can be calculated. If all available payment methods attract a surcharge, the minimum surcharge must be included in that price.

In proceedings brought by the Australian Competition and Consumer Commission (ACCC), the Federal Court ordered Jetstar, a Qantas subsidiary, to pay A$545,000 and Virgin Australia A$200,000 in penalties in 2017 for misleading drip pricing. The findings concerned booking and service fees on specified website or mobile booking channels; other allegations concerning advertising were dismissed.

The Competition and Consumer Amendment (Unfair Trading Practices) Act 2026 received royal assent on 6 July 2026 and is scheduled to commence on 1 July 2027. It introduces requirements to disclose transaction-based charges prominently alongside base prices, including the amount or method of calculation and when the charge applies, as part of wider changes addressing unfair trading and subscriptions.

Following a Reserve Bank of Australia review, card-network rules prohibiting merchants from surcharging eftpos, Mastercard, Visa and American Express payments were scheduled to take effect on 1 October 2026. The RBA's regulatory changes enable the designated networks to impose these rules; American Express announced that it would also prohibit surcharging. During the policy debate in 2025, Qantas and Virgin Australia argued that removing their ability to recover card costs through surcharges could increase base fares and pointed to their fee-free payment options.

== See also ==
- False advertising
- Surreptitious advertising
