= Kenya and the World Bank =

Kenyan National Flag

The World Bank has provided financial support for infrastructure and development programs in Kenya dating back to May 1960. The first Kenyan project that was financed by the World Bank was the African Agriculture Project, the World Bank issued the then British Colony with $5.6 million to invest in infrastructure that was vital to developing Kenya's agricultural sector.

== Description ==
The World Bank has maintained its relationship with Kenya and continues to finance development projects. Kenya receives loans from both the IDA and IBRD agencies of the World Bank which are designed to help low and middle income countries. The World Bank has publicly stated its support for the signature "Big 4 Agenda" of President Uhuru Kenyatta, which aims to develop Kenya's manufacturing sector while improving access to healthcare, nutrition, and affordable housing. The World Bank has also stated their support for Kenya's "Vision 2030", which is a development blueprint to turn Kenya into a middle income nation by 2030. The World Bank's country director for Kenya is C. Felipe Jaramillo, he also acts as the country director for Rwanda, Somalia, and Uganda. The World Bank has increased the value of its lending to Kenya in recent years, from $623 million in 2019 to $1.27 billion in 2019.

== Criticisms ==
Critics of the World Bank have raised concerns about the impact of their loans on Kenya's debt problem. The debt held by the Kenyan government has more than doubled in the past 6 years to over $50 billion. In 2019 Kenya raised their legal debt limit as their debt exceeded its previous cap of 50% of GDP. The World Bank has also been criticised for an alleged lack of concern about the negative impacts to the environment and the livelihood of local communities that projects they support may have. The Accountability Counsel and other NGO groups have alleged that World Bank funds are contributing towards the building of a coal-fired power plant in the coastal region of Lamu despite concerns about pollution and the displacement of local communities. Widespread accusations about the corrupt use of funds designated to infrastructure projects in Kenya has caused concerns about the potential for the misuse of World Bank loans. Corruption reports by the Kenyan government estimate that up to 70% of corruption in Kenya may be associated with the process of procuring government contracts, many of these contracts are financed through money borrowed from foreign governments and international financial institutions. The World Bank's Office of Suspension and Debarment has suspended and disbarred several Kenyan companies and individuals on the grounds of alleged corruption. The World Bank's IDA agency which finances projects in low income countries has included a greater emphasis on combatting corruption in its most recent reports. The IDA has committed to several projects with the goal of increasing accountability and transparency in the government's of low income countries.
