= Dark pattern =

Deceptive user interface designs

Web pop-up with dark patterns: 1. Fake urgency; 2. Offer of dubious value; 3. Fake social proof; 4. Obscure opt-out with confirm-shaming; 5. Hard-to-click preselected checkbox with trick wording

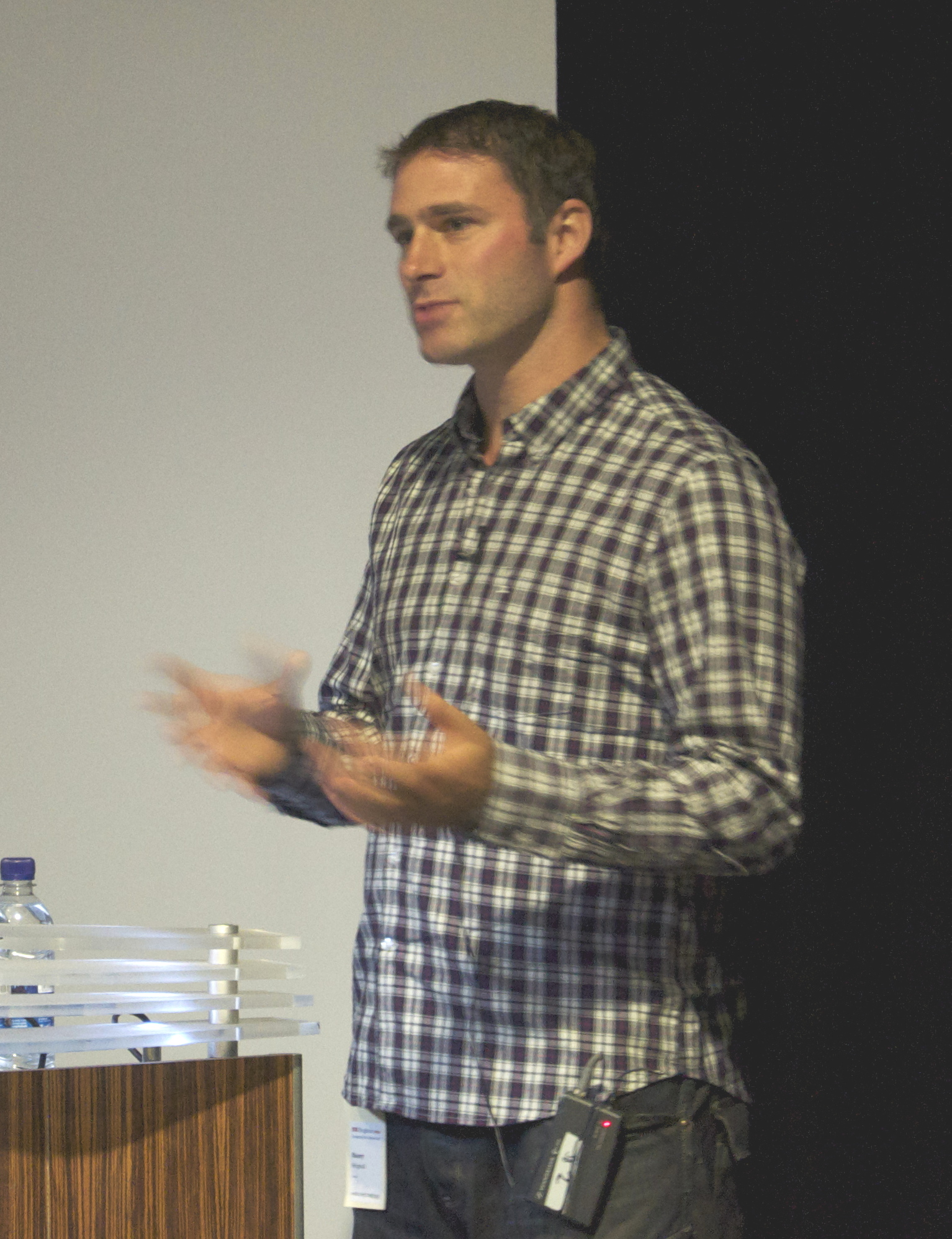
Harry Brignull in 2010

A dark pattern (also known as a "deceptive design pattern") is a user interface that has been carefully crafted to trick users into doing things, such as buying overpriced insurance with their purchase or signing up for recurring bills. User experience designer Harry Brignull coined the neologism on 28 July 2010 with the registration of darkpatterns.org, a "pattern library with the specific goal of naming and shaming deceptive user interfaces". The website has since moved to deceptive.design. In 2023, he released the book Deceptive Patterns.

In 2021, the Electronic Frontier Foundation and Consumer Reports created an online reporting form to collect information about dark patterns from the public.

== Patterns ==
=== Bait-and-switch ===
Bait-and-switch patterns advertise a free (or at a greatly reduced price) product or service that is wholly unavailable or stocked in small quantities. After announcing the product's unavailability, the page presents similar products of higher prices or lesser quality.

ProPublica has long reported on how Intuit, the parent company of TurboTax, and other companies have used the bait and switch pattern to stop Americans from being able to file their taxes for free. On 29 March 2022, the Federal Trade Commission announced that they would take legal action against Intuit in response to deceptive advertising of its free tax filing products. The commission reported that the majority of tax filers cannot use any of TurboTax's free products which were advertised, claiming that it has misled customers to believing that tax filers can use TurboTax to file their taxes. In addition, tax filers who earn farm income or are gig workers cannot be eligible for those products. Intuit announced that they would take counter action, announcing that the FTC's arguments are "not credible" and claimed that their free tax filing service is available to all tax filers.

On 4 May 2022, Intuit agreed to pay a $141 million settlement over the misleading advertisements. In May 2023, the company began sending over 4 million customers their settlement checks, which ranged from $30 to $85 USD. In January 2024, the FTC ordered Intuit to fix its misleading ads for "free" tax preparation software - for which most filers wouldn't even qualify.

As of March 2024, Intuit has stopped providing its free TurboTax service.

=== Drip pricing ===
Drip pricing is a pattern where a headline price is advertised at the beginning of a purchase process, followed by the incremental disclosure of additional fees, taxes or charges. The objective of drip pricing is to gain a consumer's interest in a misleadingly low headline price without the true final price being disclosed until the consumer has invested time and effort in the purchase process and made a decision to purchase.

=== Confirmshaming ===
Confirmshaming uses shame to drive users to act, such as when websites word an option to decline an email newsletter in a way that shames visitors into accepting.

=== Misdirection ===
Common in software installers, misdirection presents the user with a button in the fashion of a typical continuation button. A dark pattern would show a prominent "I accept these terms" button asking the user to accept the terms of a program unrelated to the one they are trying to install. Since the user typically will accept the terms by force of habit, the unrelated program can subsequently be installed. The installer's authors do this because the authors of the unrelated program pay for each installation that they procure. The alternative route in the installer, allowing the user to skip installing the unrelated program, is much less prominently displayed, or seems counter-intuitive (such as declining the terms of service).

Confusing wording may also be used to trick users into formally accepting an option which they believe has the opposite meaning. For example a personal data processing consent button using a double-negative such as "don't not sell my personal information".

=== Privacy Zuckering ===
"Privacy Zuckering" – named after Facebook co-founder and Meta Platforms CEO Mark Zuckerberg – is a practice that tricks users into sharing more information than they intended to. Users may give up this information unknowingly or through practices that obscure or delay the option to opt out of sharing their private information.

California has approved regulations that limit this practice by businesses in the California Consumer Privacy Act.

==== In AI model training ====
In mid-2024, Meta Platforms announced plans to utilize user data from Facebook and Instagram to train its AI technologies, including generative AI systems. This initiative included processing data from public and non-public posts, interactions, and even abandoned accounts. Users were given until 26 June 2024, to opt out of the data processing. However, critics noted that the process was fraught with obstacles, including misleading email notifications, redirects to login pages, and hidden opt-out forms that were difficult to locate. Even when users found the forms, they were required to provide a reason for opting out, despite Meta's policy stating that any reason would be accepted, raising questions about the necessity of this extra step.

The European Center for Digital Rights (Noyb) responded to Meta's controversial practices by filing complaints in 11 EU countries. Noyb alleged that Meta's use of "dark patterns" undermined user consent, violating the General Data Protection Regulation (GDPR). These complaints emphasized that Meta's obstructive opt-out process included hidden forms, redirect mechanisms, and unnecessary requirements like providing reasons for opting out—tactics exemplifying "dark patterns," deliberately designed to dissuade users from opting out. Additionally, Meta admitted it could not guarantee that opted-out data would be fully excluded from its training datasets, raising further concerns about user privacy and data protection compliance.

Amid mounting regulatory and public pressure, the Irish Data Protection Commission (DPC) intervened, leading Meta to pause its plans to process EU/EEA user data for AI training. This decision, while significant, did not result in a legally binding amendment to Meta's privacy policy, leaving questions about its long-term commitment to respecting EU data rights. Outside the EU, however, Meta proceeded with its privacy policy update as scheduled on 26 June 2024, prompting critics to warn about the broader implications of such practices globally.

After the incident, advocacy groups called for stronger regulatory frameworks to prevent deceptive tactics and ensure that users can exercise meaningful control over their personal information.

=== Roach motel ===
A roach motel or a trammel net design provides an easy or straightforward path to get in but a difficult path to get out. Examples include businesses that require subscribers to print and mail their opt-out or cancellation request. Several jurisdictions have responded with easy-to-cancel mandates requiring that cancelling a subscription be no more difficult than signing up.

For example, during the 2020 United States presidential election, Donald Trump's WinRed campaign employed a similar dark pattern, pushing users towards committing to a recurring monthly donation.

== Examples ==
In the X.com UI, which is restricted by a sign-in wall, one of the dark patterns is employed. It uses finger animations to persistently and repeatedly urge the user to click the sign-in button.

Deceptive design has been documented across consumer markets, and competition, consumer-protection and data-protection authorities in several countries have taken enforcement action against large companies over the design of their interfaces.

=== Online retail ===
In June 2023 the Federal Trade Commission (FTC) sued Amazon in the United States District Court for the Western District of Washington, alleging that the company had "used manipulative, coercive, or deceptive user-interface designs known as 'dark patterns' to trick consumers into enrolling in automatically-renewing Prime subscriptions", and that its cancellation process, known internally as "Iliad", routed subscribers through repeated pages of offers and alternatives. Amazon settled the case on 25 September 2025 for US$2.5 billion, comprising a US$1 billion civil penalty and US$1.5 billion in refunds to about 35 million consumers, without admitting wrongdoing; the company said that it and its executives "have always followed the law". Amazon had already altered the Prime cancellation process in Europe in July 2022, agreeing with the European Commission and the EU's Consumer Protection Cooperation network to allow cancellation in two clicks after the authorities objected to "a large number of hurdles to unsubscribe, including complicated navigation menus, skewed wording, confusing choices, and repeated nudging".

In July 2024 the British Competition and Markets Authority secured undertakings from the discount website Wowcher over countdown timers and claims such as "Running out!" that the regulator said created a false impression of urgency, and over pre-ticked boxes that signed shoppers up to a paid "VIP" membership. Wowcher agreed to drop the practices and to refund more than £4 million to about 870,000 customers.

In May 2025 the European Commission and the Consumer Protection Cooperation network notified Shein that several of its practices appeared to infringe EU consumer law, among them fake discounts and pressure selling through false purchase deadlines. The French consumer-protection directorate separately fined Shein €40 million in July 2025 over deceptive commercial practices, including discount claims that did not reflect prices actually charged beforehand.

=== Travel and ticketing ===
Drip pricing has produced repeated enforcement action against sellers of travel and event tickets. In November 2015 the Federal Court of Australia found that Jetstar, a low-cost carrier wholly owned by Qantas, and Virgin Australia had made false or misleading representations by advertising headline airfares without adequately disclosing compulsory booking and service fees – A$8.50 a passenger at Jetstar and A$7.70 at Virgin – which were disclosed only later in a multi-stage booking process. Other allegations made by the Australian Competition and Consumer Commission were not established. In March 2017 the court ordered Jetstar to pay A$545,000 and Virgin A$200,000 in penalties. The same court ordered the online travel agency Webjet to pay A$9 million in July 2025 after it admitted advertising airfares – in one instance "from $18" – that excluded compulsory fees of between A$34.90 and A$54.90 a booking.

In Canada, the Competition Tribunal held in September 2024 that the cinema chain Cineplex had engaged in drip pricing by advertising ticket prices that omitted a compulsory C$1.50 online booking fee, and ordered it to pay C$38.9 million under the drip-pricing provisions added to Canada's Competition Act in 2022. The Federal Court of Appeal dismissed Cineplex's appeal in January 2026, and the company said it would seek leave to appeal to the Supreme Court of Canada.

=== Subscription services ===
In June 2024 the FTC and the United States Department of Justice sued Adobe, alleging that the company made an "annual, paid monthly" plan the pre-selected option while disclosing its early termination fee only in small print or behind an icon that had to be hovered over, and that cancelling required navigating repeated pages, offers and warnings. Adobe agreed in March 2026 to a US$150 million settlement of the claims, brought under the Restore Online Shoppers' Confidence Act, half in civil penalties and half in services to customers. In April 2025 the FTC brought a comparable action against Uber over its Uber One subscription, alleging that cancellation could require as many as 23 screens and 32 separate actions. Uber rejected the allegations, saying that Uber One's "sign-up and cancellation processes are clear, simple, and follow the letter and spirit of the law" and that most cancellations took "20 seconds or less".

=== Consent interfaces ===
In January 2022 the French data-protection authority, the Commission nationale de l'informatique et des libertés (CNIL), fined Google €150 million and Facebook €60 million after finding that a single click accepted cookies on Google, Youtube and Facebook while refusing them required several. The companies were given three months to comply or pay €100,000 for each further day of delay. Reporting on the decisions characterised them as enforcement against cookie-consent dark patterns. In September 2025 the CNIL fined the operator of shein.com €150 million after finding that its banner omitted the advertising purpose of the cookies it set, and that cookies continued to be placed and read after users had clicked "Refuse all".

== Research ==
In 2016 and 2017, research documented social media anti-privacy practices using dark patterns. In 2018, the Norwegian Consumer Council (Forbrukerrådet) published "Deceived by Design," a report on deceptive user interface designs of Facebook, Google, and Microsoft. A 2019 study investigated practices on 11,000 shopping web sites. It identified 1,818 dark patterns in total and grouped them into 15 categories.

Research from April 2022 found that dark patterns are still commonly used in the marketplace, highlighting a need for further scrutiny of such practices by the public, researchers, and regulators.

Under the European Union General Data Protection Regulation (GDPR), all companies must obtain unambiguous, freely-given consent from customers before they collect and use ("process") their personally identifiable information. A 2020 study found that "big tech" companies often used deceptive user interfaces in order to discourage their users from opting out. In 2022, a report by the European Commission found that "97% of the most popular websites and apps used by EU consumers deployed at least one dark pattern."

Research on advertising network documentation shows that information presented to mobile app developers on these platforms is focused on complying with legal regulations, and puts the responsibility for such decisions on the developer. Also, sample code and settings often have privacy-unfriendly defaults laced with dark patterns to nudge developers’ decisions towards privacy-unfriendly options such as sharing sensitive data to increase revenue.

== Legality ==
=== United States ===
Bait-and-switch is a form of fraud that violates US law.

On 9 April 2019, US senators Deb Fischer and Mark Warner introduced the Deceptive Experiences To Online Users Reduction (DETOUR) Act, which would make it illegal for companies with more than 100 million monthly active users to use dark patterns when seeking consent to use their personal information.

In March 2021, California adopted amendments to the California Consumer Privacy Act, which prohibits the use of deceptive user interfaces that have "the substantial effect of subverting or impairing a consumer's choice to opt-out."

In October 2021, the Federal Trade Commission (FTC) issued an enforcement policy statement, announcing a crackdown on businesses using dark patterns that "trick or trap consumers into subscription services." As a result of rising numbers of complaints, the agency is responding by enforcing these consumer protection laws.

In 2022, New York Attorney General Letitia James fined Fareportal $2.6 million for using deceptive marketing tactics to sell airline tickets and hotel rooms and the Federal Court of Australia fined Expedia Group's Trivago A$44.7 million for misleading consumers into paying higher prices for hotel room bookings.

In March 2023, the United States Federal Trade Commission fined Fortnite developer Epic Games $245 million for use of "dark patterns to trick users into making purchases." The $245 million will be used to refund affected customers and is the largest refund amount ever issued by the FTC in a gaming case.

=== European Union ===
In the European Union, the GDPR requires that a user's informed consent to processing of their personal information be unambiguous, freely-given, and specific to each usage of personal information. This is intended to prevent attempts to have users unknowingly accept all data processing by default (which violates the regulation).

According to the European Data Protection Board, the "principle of fair processing laid down in Article 5 (1) (a) GDPR serves as a starting point to assess whether a design pattern actually constitutes a 'dark pattern'."

At the end of 2023 the final version of the Data Act was adopted. It is one of the three EU legislations which deal expressly with dark patterns. Another one being the Digital Services Act. The third EU legislation on dark patterns in force is the directive financial services contracts concluded at a distance. The Public German Consumer Protection Organisation claims Big Tech uses dark patterns to violate the Digital Services Act.

=== United Kingdom ===
In April 2019, the UK Information Commissioner's Office (ICO) issued a proposed "age-appropriate design code" for the operations of social networking services when used by minors, which prohibits using "nudges" to draw users into options that have low privacy settings. This code would be enforceable under the Data Protection Act 2018. It took effect 2 September 2020.

== See also ==
- Anti-pattern – Solution to a problem that may be commonly used but is generally a bad choice
- Confusopoly – Intentionally confusing marketing
- Crippleware – Product with intentionally limited features in favor of a more expensive version
- Enshittification – Decline in online platform quality
- Gamification – Using game design elements in non-games
- Growth hacking – Subfield of marketing
- Jamba!
- Marketing ethics
- Opt-in email – System in which a user must opt into an emailing list to receive it
- Opt-out – Option avoid receiving unsolicited product or service information
- Nudge theory – Concept in behavioral economics, political theory and behavioral sciences
- Revolving credit – Type of credit that does not have a fixed number of payments
- Shadow banning – Blocking a user from an online community without their awareness
- Surreptitious advertising – Stealth marketing

== See also ==
- Easy-to-cancel mandate
