= The Market for Lemons =

1970 economics paper by George Akerlof

"The Market for 'Lemons': Quality Uncertainty and the Market Mechanism" is a widely cited seminal paper in the field of economics which explores the concept of asymmetric information in markets. The paper was written in 1970 by George Akerlof and published in the Quarterly Journal of Economics. The paper's theory has since been applied to many types of markets.

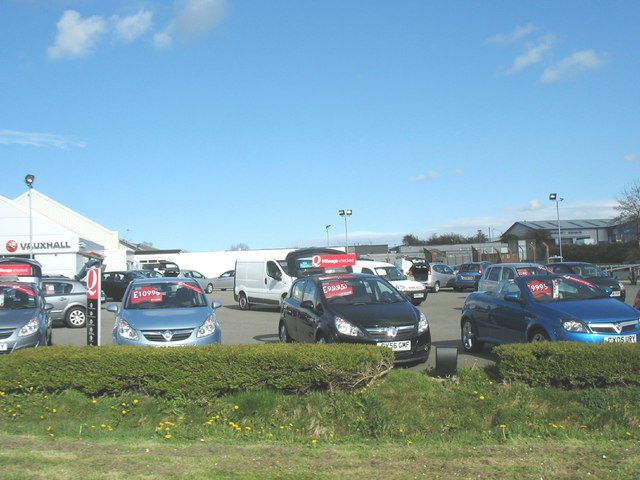
Akerlof's paper uses the market for used cars as an example of the problem of quality uncertainty. It concludes that owners of high-quality used cars will not place their cars on the used car market. A car buyer should only be able to buy low-quality used cars, and will pay accordingly as the market for good used cars does not exist.

Akerlof examines how the quality of goods traded in a market can degrade in the presence of information asymmetry between buyers and sellers, which ultimately leaves goods that are found to be defective after purchase in the market, noted by the term 'lemon' in the title of the paper. In American slang, a lemon is a car that is found to be defective after it has been bought.

Akerlof's theory of the "Market for Lemons" paper applies to markets with information asymmetry, focusing on the used car market. Information asymmetry within the market relates to the seller having more information about the quality of the car as opposed to the buyer, creating adverse selection. Adverse selection is a phenomenon where sellers are not willing to sell high quality goods at the lower prices buyers are willing to pay, with the result that buyers get lower quality goods. This can lead to a market collapse due to the lower equilibrium price and quantity of goods traded in the market than a market with perfect information.

Suppose buyers cannot distinguish between a high-quality car (a "peach") and a low-quality car (a "lemon"). Then they are only willing to pay a fixed price for a car that averages the value of a "peach" and "lemon" together (p_{avg}). But sellers know whether they hold a peach or a lemon. Given the fixed price at which buyers will buy, sellers will sell only when they hold "lemons" (since p_{lemon} < p_{avg}) and they will leave the market when they hold "peaches" (since p_{peach} > p_{avg}). Eventually, as enough sellers of "peaches" leave the market, the average willingness-to-pay of buyers will decrease (since the average quality of cars on the market decreased), leading to even more sellers of high-quality cars to leave the market through a positive feedback loop. Thus the uninformed buyer's price creates an adverse selection problem that drives the high-quality cars from the market. Adverse selection is a market mechanism that can lead to a market collapse.

Akerlof's paper shows how prices can determine the quality of goods traded on the market. Low prices drive away sellers of high-quality goods, leaving only lemons behind. In 2001, Akerlof, along with Michael Spence, and Joseph Stiglitz, jointly received the Nobel Memorial Prize in Economic Sciences, for their research on issues related to asymmetric information.

== The paper ==
=== Thesis ===
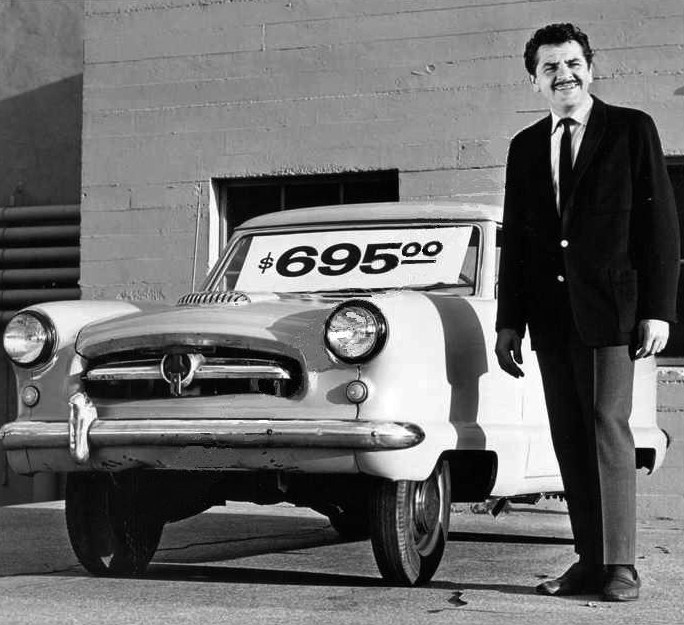
Actor Ernie Kovacs portraying a used-car salesman

Akerlof's paper uses the market for used cars as an example of the problem of quality uncertainty. A used car is one in which ownership is transferred from one person to another, after a period of use by its first owner and its inevitable wear and tear. There are good used cars ("peaches") and defective used cars ("lemons"), normally as a consequence of several not-always-traceable variables, such as the owner's driving style, quality and frequency of maintenance, and accident history. Because many important mechanical parts and other elements are hidden from view and not easily accessible for inspection, the buyer of a car does not know beforehand whether it is a peach or a lemon. So the buyer's best guess for a given car is that the car is of average quality; accordingly, the buyer will be willing to pay the price of a car of known average quality. This means that the owner of a carefully maintained, never-abused, good used car will not be able to get a high enough price to make selling that car worthwhile.

Therefore, owners of 'peaches' will not place their cars on the used market as they believe their car is worth more than the market price. The withdrawal of good cars reduces the average quality of cars on the market, causing buyers to revise downward their expectations for any given car. This, in turn, motivates the owners of moderately good cars not to sell, and so on. The result is that a market in which there is asymmetric information with respect to quality shows characteristics similar to those described by Gresham's law: the bad drives out the good. (Although Gresham's principle applies more specifically to exchange rates, modified analogies can be drawn.)

=== Statistical abstract of the problem ===
Akerlof considers a situation in which demand D for used cars depends on the cars price p and quality μ = μ(p) and the supply S depends on price alone. Economic equilibrium is given by S(p) = D(p,μ) and there are two groups of traders with utilities given by:

$$U_1 = M+\sum_{i=1}^n x_i$$

$$U_2 = M+\sum_{i=1}^n \frac{3}{2} x_i$$

where M is the consumption of goods other than automobiles, x the car's quality and n the number of automobiles. Let Y_{i}, D_{i} and S_{i} be income, demand and supply for group i. Assuming that utilities are linear, that the traders are Von Neumann–Morgenstern utility maximizers and that the price of other M goods is unitary, the demand D_{1} for cars is Y_{1}/p if μ/p > 1, otherwise null. The demand D_{2} is Y_{2}/p if 3μ/2 > p, otherwise null. Market demand is given by:

$$D(p,\mu)=\begin{cases} \left( Y_2+Y_1 \right)/p & p < \mu, \\ Y_2/p & \mu < p < 3\mu/2, \\ 0 & p > 3\mu/2, \end{cases}$$

Group 1 has N cars to sell with quality between 0 and 2 and group 2 has no cars to sell, therefore S_{1} = pN/2 and S_{2} = 0. For a given price p, average quality is p/2, and therefore D = 0. The market for used cars collapses when there is asymmetric information.

=== Asymmetric information ===
The paper by Akerlof describes how the interaction between quality heterogeneity and asymmetric information can lead to the disappearance of a market where guarantees are indefinite. In this model, as quality is indistinguishable beforehand by the buyer (due to the asymmetry of information), incentives exist for the seller to pass off low-quality goods as higher-quality ones. The buyer, however, takes this incentive into consideration, and takes the quality of the goods to be uncertain. Only the average quality of the goods will be considered, which in turn will have the side effect that goods that are above average in terms of quality will be driven out of the market. This mechanism is repeated until a no-trade equilibrium is reached.

As a consequence of the mechanism described in this paper, markets may fail to exist altogether in certain situations involving quality uncertainty. Examples given in Akerlof's paper include the market for used cars, the dearth of formal credit markets in developing countries, and the difficulties that the elderly encounter in buying health insurance. However, not all players in a given market will follow the same rules or have the same aptitude of assessing quality. So there will always be a distinct advantage for some vendors to offer low-quality goods to the less-informed segment of a market that, on the whole, appears to be of reasonable quality and have reasonable guarantees of certainty. This is part of the basis for the idiom buyer beware.

== Critical reception ==
George E. Hoffer and Michael D. Pratt state that the "economic literature is divided on whether a lemons market actually exists in used vehicles". The authors' research supports the hypothesis that "known defects provisions", used by US states (e.g., Wisconsin) to regulate used car sales, have been ineffectual, because the quality of used vehicles sold in these states is not significantly better than the vehicles in neighboring states without such consumer protection legislation.

Both the American Economic Review and the Review of Economic Studies rejected the paper for "triviality", while the reviewers for Journal of Political Economy rejected it as incorrect, arguing that, if this paper were correct, then no goods could be traded. Only on the fourth attempt did the paper get published in Quarterly Journal of Economics. Today, the paper is one of the most-cited papers in modern economic theory and most downloaded economic journal paper of all time in RePEC (more than 39,275 citations in academic papers as of February 2022). It has profoundly influenced virtually every field of economics, from industrial organisation and public finance to macroeconomics and contract theory.

== Conditions for a lemon market ==
A lemon market will be produced by the following:

1. Asymmetry of information, in which no buyers can accurately assess the value of a product through examination before sale is made and all sellers can more accurately assess the value of a product prior to sale
2. An incentive exists for the seller to pass off a low-quality product as a higher-quality one
3. Sellers have no credible disclosure technology (sellers with a great car have no way to disclose this credibly to buyers)
4. Either a continuum of seller qualities exists or the average seller type is sufficiently low (buyers are sufficiently pessimistic about the seller's quality)
5. Deficiency of effective public quality assurances (by reputation or regulation and/or of effective guarantees/warranties)

=== A more general mathematical model of market collapse ===
It is possible to generalize the reasoning in Akerlof's paper. Suppose that there are two populations of cars: the peaches $\mathcal{P}$ and the lemons $\mathcal{L}$, where we assume that the quality $\mu(\cdot)$ of peaches is always greater than the quality of lemons:
$$\mu(\rho) > \mu(\ell), \quad \forall \rho \in\mathcal{P}, \; \ell \in \mathcal{L}$$
Accordingly, the utility $U(\cdot)$ and the price $p$ of the peaches will also always be greater than that of the lemons. Let $\eta$ be the probability of a buyer encountering a peach in the used car market. Then the expected utility for the buyer $U_{e}$ from purchasing a used car is:
$$U_{e} = \eta U\left(\overline{\rho}\right) + (1-\eta)U\left(\overline{\ell} \right), \quad U'(\cdot) > 0, \; U''(\cdot) < 0$$
where $\overline{\rho}$ and $\overline{\ell}$ represent the mean peach and lemon respectively. The expected utility for the buyer will always increase - for a monotonic, positive utility function - as the probability of encountering a peach increases.
$${\partial U_{e}\over{\partial \eta}} = U\left(\overline{\rho}\right) - U\left(\overline{\ell} \right) > 0$$
Furthermore, the equation for a buyer's expected utility implies that the equilibrium price in an informationally symmetric market is:
$$p_{\text{sym}}^{*} = \eta U\left(\overline{\rho}\right) + (1-\eta)U\left(\overline{\ell} \right)$$
However, the used car market is not a symmetric market: the sellers know which cars are peaches and lemons, while the buyers cannot distinguish between the two. Depending on the type of car he owns, the seller has a differing decision rule based on the offer price $O$:
$$\text{Sell} \implies \begin{cases} O \geq p_{\rho}, \quad &(\text{Peach}) \\ O\geq p_{\ell}, \quad &(\text{Lemon}) \end{cases}$$
with $p_{\rho} > p_{\ell}$ by definition. It is also assumed that, for both peaches and lemons, sellers are willing to accept a price lower than the full value of the car:
$$p_{\ell} < U\left(\overline{\ell}\right) < p_{\rho} < U\left(\overline{\rho}\right)$$
However, if $p_{\text{sym}}^{*} < p_{\rho}$, then the sellers possessing peaches will not put them on the market and the equilibrium price will drop. This occurs when:
$$\eta < {p_{\rho} - U\left(\overline{\ell} \right)\over{U\left(\overline{\rho}\right)-U\left(\overline{\ell} \right)}}$$
with the associated asymmetric information price equilibrium:
$$p_{\text{asym}}^{*} = \eta \left[U\left( \overline{\rho}\right) - U\left(\overline{\ell}\right) \right]\mathbb{I}(p_{\text{sym}}^{*} \geq p_{\rho} ) + U\left(\overline{\ell}\right)$$
where $\mathbb{I}(\cdot)$ is the indicator function. Once lemons saturate the market, the peaches are driven out of the market because their sellers cannot be matched with buyers to meet their selling price in equilibrium. The beauty of this example is that it illustrates how product quality can collapse in a market with asymmetric information.

== Laws in the United States ==
Five years after Akerlof's paper was published, the United States enacted a federal "lemon law" (the Magnuson–Moss Warranty Act) that protects citizens of all states. There are also state laws regarding "lemons" which vary by state and may not necessarily cover used or leased vehicles. The rights afforded to consumers by "lemon laws" may exceed the warranties expressed in purchase contracts. These state laws provide remedies to consumers for automobiles that repeatedly fail to meet certain standards of quality and performance. "Lemon law" is the common nickname for these laws, but each state has different names for the laws and acts, which may also cover more than just automobiles. In California and federal law, "Lemon Laws" cover anything mechanical.

The federal "lemon law" also provides that the warrantor may be obligated to pay the attorney fees of the party prevailing in a lemon law suit, as do most state lemon laws. If a car has to be repaired for the same defect four or more times and the problem is still occurring, the car may be deemed to be a "lemon". The defect must substantially hinder the vehicle's use, value, or safety. Dealers and manufacturers are required by law to brand the title of such vehicles as "Lemon Law Buyback" after reacquiring them due to any defect, malfunction or failure under the federal statute or typically nonconformities under state "lemon laws". Dealers may not withhold the lemon branding of such vehicles, and an "as is" or "with all defects" labeling does not protect a dealer from legal recourse should they fail to disclose the "lemon law buyback" status of such vehicles.

== Developments of the model ==
Akerlof's original model has been developed by adjusting certain parameters to better represent the real world markets. Akerlof limited the market to fixed buyers and sellers, disregarding the possibility that agents are able to interchange their position, with low transaction costs. This would be valid for other markets with asymmetric information; however, the used car market is unique in that a buyer can purchase a car and become a seller. Kim incorporates a variability of agents in the market. Moreover, in this model, sellers are differentiated unlike the Akerlof model where sellers are heterogeneous apart from the cars they sell and therefore their behaviors are dependent on the car they own. By changing the parameters of the model this study's findings conclude that the lemon principle does not hold.

Daley and Green elaborate the model by segmenting the market equilibrium into intervals of no trade periods and trade periods, whereby trade periods are facilitated by the arrival of "news", categorized as stochastic information. The onset of bad news instigates trade as buyers are more pessimistic, whereas good news establishes confidence in the market. At the equilibrium, the following states occur:

- A positive perspective of the seller results in an efficient market, whereby the price is the expected value of the asset;
- A negative perspective of the seller results in a partial sell-off of the asset;
- An indifferent perspective of the seller results in a no-trade period, whereby consumers wait for more information.

Both sellers with a positive and negative perspective eventually trade in equilibrium, thus mitigating the trade breakdown inefficiency prevalent in Akerlof's model. However, by integrating news into the model, a new inefficiency arises. This is where delays occur when more news is introduced in the market. Theoretically, more news would reduce market inefficiencies caused by information asymmetry. The dynamic market model constructed shows that this is only partially true.

Zavolokina, Schlegel and Schwabe incorporate the benefits of modern technology into the model as blockchain is able to solve issues relating to the asymmetry of information. The reliability of the information would improve accuracy of the valuation of cars, however, the advantages of the information stored is limited to the interpretation of the buyer. The information would have to be understandable to consumers with no car expertise to be an effective mechanism for decision making.

== Empirical applications ==
Although Akerlof's "Market for Lemons" paper was written solely focusing on the used car market, there are many other applications of this theory in other types of markets beyond the used car market. Examples of applications include health insurance, vehicle related insurance and also within the labour market which, similarly to Akerlof's theory these examples can all lead to market failures through adverse selection.

Beyond the used car market, insurance companies charge excessive premiums to those who are distinguished as high-risk individuals as people under this term are likely to file more claims to the insurance company. As a result, high risk individuals are likely to cost insurance companies more as they are likely to pay the individual out more money due to the increased claims. Akerlof's theory has been used to explain this scenario where insurance companies charge higher premiums to individuals who they believe carry out more risk in attempt to compensate for the greater chance that claims are filed under the individual's policy.

Another example of an empirical application is within the labour market where, wage discrimination could be a factor as the employer is likely to have more information of the skills and experience of the employee than the employee themself. This is also applicable when employees apply for jobs as employers may be hesitant or decide not to hire workers without previous work experience in the specific field, resulting in those who do not have prior experience or are new to the workforce to be denied by employers.

Health insurance also falls into the consideration of adverse selection where healthy individuals with no family history of medical concerns may choose not to purchase health insurance as they don't feel the need to pay the premium, where other individuals with pre-existing conditions or a family history of medical issues are likely to purchase health insurance. As result, healthy individuals are pushed out of the market, creating a smaller group of policy holders, which drives up the price/premium of health insurance for other individuals who decide to purchase the insurance.

== See also ==
- Adverse selection
- Confusopoly
- Death spiral (insurance)
- Gresham's law
- Tragedy of the commons
- Transaction cost
- Transparency (market)
- Open data
