= Information asymmetry =

Concept in contract theory and economics

In an asymmetric balance of power, one side has more information than the other.

In contract theory, mechanism design, and economics, an information asymmetry is a situation where one party has more or better information than the other.

Information asymmetry creates an imbalance of power in transactions, which can sometimes cause the transactions to be inefficient, causing market failure in the worst case. Examples of this problem are adverse selection, moral hazard, and monopolies of knowledge.

A common analogy used to visualise information asymmetry is the typical weighing scale, wherein one side represents the seller and the other the buyer. When the seller has more or better information, the transaction will more likely occur in the seller's favour (the balance leans to the seller's side). An example of this could be when a used car is sold, in which case the seller is likely to have a much better understanding of the car's condition—and hence its market value—than the buyer, who can only estimate the market value based on the information provided by the seller and their own assessment of the vehicle. Conversely, in a scenario where the buyer has more information, the scale leaning towards the buyer's side represents a shift in the power to manipulate the transaction. When buying health insurance, the buyer is not always required to provide full details of future health risks. By not providing this information to the insurance company, the buyer will pay the same premium as someone less likely to require a payout in the future. Alternatively, a state of equilibrium can be achieved whereby both agents are equally knowledgeable. If it's the case that all information relevant to a given transaction is known to both (or all) parties, the situation is said to be a perfect information scenario.

Information asymmetry extends to non-economic behaviour. Private firms have better information than regulators about the actions that they would take in the absence of regulation, and the effectiveness of a regulation may be undermined. International relations theory has recognized that wars may be caused by asymmetric information and that "Most of the great wars of the modern era resulted from leaders miscalculating their prospects for victory". Jackson and Morelli wrote that there is asymmetric information between national leaders, when there are differences "in what they know [i.e. believe] about each other's armaments, quality of military personnel and tactics, determination, geography, political climate, or even just about the relative probability of different outcomes" or where they have "incomplete information about the motivations of other agents".

Information asymmetries are studied in the context of principal–agent problems where they are a major cause of misinforming and is essential in every communication process. Information asymmetry is in contrast to perfect information, which is a key assumption in neo-classical economics.

In 1996, a Nobel Memorial Prize in Economics was awarded to James A. Mirrlees and William Vickrey for their "fundamental contributions to the economic theory of incentives under asymmetric information". This led the Nobel Committee to acknowledge the importance of information problems in economics. They later awarded another Nobel Prize in 2001 to George Akerlof, Michael Spence, and Joseph E. Stiglitz for their "analyses of markets with asymmetric information". The 2007 Nobel Memorial Prize in Economic Sciences was awarded to Leonid Hurwicz, Eric Maskin, and Roger Myerson "for having laid the foundations of mechanism design theory", a field dealing with designing markets that encourage participants to honestly reveal their information.

== History ==
The puzzle of information asymmetry has existed for as long as the market itself but remained largely unstudied until the post-WWII period. It is an umbrella term that can contain a vast diversity of topics.

Greek Stoics (2nd century BCE) treated the advantage that sellers derive from privileged information in the story of the Merchant of Rhodes. Accordingly, a famine had broken out on the island of Rhodes and several grain merchants in Alexandria set sail to deliver supplies. One of these merchants who arrives ahead of his competitors faces a choice: should he let Rhodians know that grain supplies are on the way or keep this knowledge to himself? Either decision will determine his profit margin. Cicero related this dilemma in De Officiis and agreed with Greek Stoics that the merchant had a duty to disclose. Thomas Aquinas overturned this consensus and considered price disclosure was not obligatory.

The three topics mentioned above drew on some important predecessors. Joseph Stiglitz considered the work of earlier economists, including Adam Smith, John Stuart Mill, and Max Weber. He ultimately concludes that though these economists seemed to have an understanding of the problems of information, they largely did not consider the implications of them, and tended to minimize the impact they could have or consider them merely secondary issues.

One exception to this is the work of economist Friedrich Hayek. His work with prices as information conveying relative scarcity of goods can be noted as an early form of acknowledging information asymmetry, but with a different name.

=== 2001 Nobel Prize Inspirations ===
Information problems have always affected the lives of humans, yet it was not studied with any seriousness until near the 1970s when three economists fleshed out models which revolutionized the way we think about information and its interaction with the market. George Akerlof's paper The Market for Lemons introduced a model to help explain a variety of market outcomes when quality is uncertain. Akerlof's primary model considers the automobile market where the seller knows the exact quality of a car. In contrast, the buyer only knows the probability of whether a vehicle is good or bad (a lemon). Since the buyer pays the same price (based on their expected quality) for good cars and bad cars, sellers with high-quality cars may find the transaction unprofitable and leave, resulting in a market with a higher proportion of bad cars. The pathological path can continue as the buyer adjusts the expected quality and offers even lower prices, further driving out cars with not-so-bad quality. This results in a market failure purely driven by information asymmetry, as under perfect information, all cars can be sold according to their quality. Akerlof extends the model to explain other phenomena: Why raising the insurance price cannot facilitate seniors getting medical insurance? Why may employers rationally refuse to hire minorities? Through various applications, Akerlof developed the importance of trust in markets and highlighted the "cost of dishonesty" in insurance markets, credit markets, and developing areas. Around the same time, an economist by the name of Michael Spence wrote on the topic of job market signaling, and was introduced a work of the same name. The final topic is Stiglitz's work on the mechanism of screening. These three economists helped to further clarify a variety of economic puzzles at the time and would go on to win a Nobel Prize in 2001 for their contributions to the field. Since then, several economists have followed in their footsteps to solve more pieces of the puzzle.

==== Akerlof ====
Akerlof drew heavily from the work of economist Kenneth Arrow. Arrow, who was awarded a Nobel Prize in Economics in 1972, studied uncertainty in the field of medical care, among other things (Arrow 1963). His work highlighted several factors which became important to Akerlof's studies. First, is the idea of moral hazard. By being insured, customers may be inclined to be less careful than they otherwise would without insurance because they know the costs will be covered. Thus, an incentive to be less careful and increase risk exists. Second, Arrow studied the business models of insurance companies and noted that higher-risk individuals are pooled with lower-risk individuals, but both are covered at the same cost. Third, Arrow noted the role of trust in the relationship between doctor and patient. Medical providers only get paid when a patient is sick, and not when a person is healthy. Because of this, there is a great incentive for doctors to not provide the quality of care they could. A patient must defer to the doctor and trust that the doctor is using their knowledge to their best advantage to provide the patient with the best care. Thus, a relationship of trust is established. According to Arrow, the doctor relies on the social obligation of trust to sell their services to the public, even though the patients do not or cannot inspect the quality of a doctor's work. Last, he notes how this unique relationship demands that high levels of education and certification be attained by doctors in order to maintain the quality of medical service provided by doctors. These four ideas from Arrow contributed largely to Akerlof's work.

==== Spence ====
Spence cited no sources for his inspiration. However, he did acknowledge Kenneth Arrow and Thomas Schelling as helpful in discussing ideas during his pursuit of knowledge. He was the first to coin the term "signaling", and encouraged other economists to follow in his footsteps because he believed he had introduced an important concept in economics.

==== Stiglitz ====
Most of Stiglitz's academic inspirations were from his contemporaries. Stiglitz primarily attributes his thinking to articles by Spence, Akerlof, and a few earlier works by him and his co-author Michael Rothschild (Rothschild and Stiglitz 1976), each discussing various aspects of screening and the role of education. Stiglitz's work was a complement to the works of Spence and Akerlof and thus drew from some of the same inspirations from Arrow as Akerlof had.

The discussion of information asymmetry came to the forefront of economics in the 1970s when Akerlof introduced the idea of a "market for lemons" in a paper by the same name (Akerlof 1970). In this paper, Akerlof introduced a fundamental concept that certain sellers of used cars have more knowledge than the buyers, and this can lead to what is known as "adverse selection". This idea may be one of the most important in the history and understanding of asymmetric information in economics.

Spence introduced the idea of "signaling" shortly after the publication of Akerlof's work.

Stiglitz expanded upon the ideas of Spence and Akerlof by introducing an economic function of information asymmetry called "screening". Stiglitz's work in this area referred to the market for insurance, which is rife with information asymmetry problems to be studied.

=== Impact of 2001 Nobel Work ===
These three economists' simple yet revolutionary work birthed a movement in economics that changed how the field viewed the market forever. No longer can perfect information be assumed in some problems, as in most neoclassical models. Information asymmetry began to grow in prevalence in academic literature. In 1996, a Nobel Prize was given to James Mirrlees and William Vickrey for their research back in the 1970s and 1970s on incentive problems when facing uncertainty under asymmetric information. The impact of such academic work can go unrecognized for decades. Differing from the topics presented by Akerlof, Spence and Stiglitz, Mirrlees and Vickrey focused on how income taxation and auctions can be used as a mechanism to draw out information from market participants efficiently. This award marked the importance of information asymmetry in economics. It began a greater discussion on the topic that later led the Nobel committee to award three economists again in 2001 for significant contributions to the aforementioned topics.

These economists continued after the 1970s to contribute to the field of economics and develop their theories, and they have all had significant impacts. Akerlof's work had more impact than just the market for used cars. The pooling effect in the used car market also happens in the employment market for minorities.

One of the most notable impacts of Akerlof's work is its impact on Keynesian theory. Akerlof argues that the Keynesian theory of unemployment being voluntary implies that quits would rise with unemployment. He argues against his critics by drawing upon reasoning based on psychology and sociology rather than pure economics. He supplemented this with an argument that people do not always behave rationally, but rather information asymmetry leads to only "near rationality", which causes people to deviate from optimal behavior regarding employment practices.

Akerlof continues to champion behavioral economics, that these breaches into the fields of psychology and sociology are profound extensions of information asymmetry.

Stiglitz wrote that the trio's work has created a substantial wave in the field of economics. He notes how he explored the economies of third-world countries, and they seemed to exhibit behavior consistent with their theories. He noted how other economists have referred to gaining information as a transaction cost. Stiglitz also attempts to narrow down the sources of information asymmetries. He ties it back to the nature of each individual having information that others do not. Stiglitz also mentions how information asymmetry can be overcome. He believes there are two crucial things to consider: first, the incentives, and second, the mechanisms for overcoming information asymmetry. He argues that the incentives will always be there because markets are inherently informationally inefficient. If there is an opportunity to profit from gaining knowledge, people will do so. If there is no profit to be had, then people will not do so.

Spence's work on signaling moved on in the 1980s to spawn the field of study known as game theory.

The idea of information asymmetry has also had a significant effect on management research. It continues to offer additional improvements and opportunities as scholars continue their work.

== Models ==
Information asymmetry models assume one party possesses some information that other parties have no access to. Some asymmetric information models can also be used in situations where at least one party can enforce, or effectively retaliate for breaches of, certain parts of an agreement, whereas the other(s) cannot.

=== Adverse selection ===
Akerlof suggested that information asymmetry leads to adverse selections. In adverse selection models, the ignorant party lacks or has differing information while negotiating an agreed understanding of or contract to the transaction. An example of adverse selection is when people who are high-risk are more likely to buy insurance because the insurance company cannot effectively discriminate against them, usually due to lack of information about the particular individual's risk but also sometimes by force of law or other constraints.

Credence goods are goods where the buyer lacks knowledge about a product's quality, even after the product is consumed. This is true, for example, in the case of complex medical treatments.

=== Moral hazard ===
Moral hazard occurs when the ignorant party lacks information about the performance of the agreed-upon transaction or lacks the ability to retaliate for a breach of the agreement. This can result in a situation where a party is more likely to take risks because they are not fully responsible for the consequences of their actions. An example of moral hazard is when people are more likely to behave recklessly after becoming insured, either because the insurer cannot observe this behaviour or cannot effectively retaliate against it, for example, by failing to renew the insurance.

Moral Hazard is not limited to individuals: firms can act more recklessly if they know they will be bailed out. For example, banks will allow parties to take out risky loans if they know that the government will bail them out.

=== Monopolies of knowledge ===
In the model of monopolies of knowledge, the ignorant party has no right to access all the critical information about a situation for decision-making. Meaning one party has exclusive control over information. This type of information asymmetry can be seen in government. An example of monopolies of knowledge is that in some enterprises, only high-level management can fully access the corporate information provided by a third party. At the same time, lower-level employees are required to make important decisions with only limited information provided to them.

== Solutions ==
Countermeasures have widely been discussed to reduce information asymmetry. The classic paper on adverse selection is George Akerlof's "The Market for Lemons" from 1970, which brought informational issues to the forefront of economic theory. Exploring signaling and screening, the paper discusses two primary solutions to this problem. A similar concept is moral hazard, which differs from adverse selection at the timing level. While adverse selection affects parties before the interaction, moral hazard affects parties after the interaction. Regulatory instruments such as mandatory information disclosure can also reduce information asymmetry. Warranties can further help mitigate the effect of asymmetric information.

=== Signalling ===
Michael Spence originally proposed the idea of signalling. He suggested that in a situation with information asymmetry, it is possible for people to signal their type, thus believably transferring information to the other party and resolving the asymmetry.

This idea was initially studied in the context of matching in the job market. An employer is interested in hiring a new employee who is "skilled in learning". Of course, all prospective employees will claim to be "skilled in learning", but only they know if they really are. This is an information asymmetry.

Spence proposes, for example, that going to college can function as a credible signal of an ability to learn. Assuming that people who are skilled in learning can finish college more easily than people who are unskilled, then by finishing college, the skilled people signal their skills to prospective employers. No matter how much or how little they may have learned in college or what they studied, finishing functions as a signal of their capacity for learning. However, finishing college may merely function as a signal of their ability to pay for college; it may signal the willingness of individuals to adhere to orthodox views, or it may signal a willingness to comply with authority.

Signalling theory can be used in e-commerce research. Information asymmetry in e-commerce comes from information distortion that leads to the buyer's misunderstanding of the seller's true characteristics before the contract. Mavlanova, Benbunan-Fich and Koufaris (2012) noticed that signalling theory explains the relation between signals and qualities, illustrating why some signals are trustworthy and others are not. In e-commerce, signals deliver information about the characteristics of the seller. For instance, high-quality sellers are able to show their identity to buyers by using signs and logos, and then buyers check these signals to evaluate the credibility and validity of a seller's qualities. The study of Mavlanova, Benbunan-Fich and Koufaris (2012) also confirmed that signal usage is different between low-quality and high-quality online sellers. Low-quality sellers are more likely to avoid using expensive, easy-to-verify signals and tend to use fewer signals than high-quality sellers. Thus, signals help reduce information asymmetry.

=== Screening ===
Joseph E. Stiglitz pioneered the theory of screening. In this way, the under informed party can induce the other party to reveal their information. They can provide a menu of choices in such a way that the choice depends on the private information of the other party.

The side of asymmetry can occur on either buyer or seller. For example, sellers with better information than buyers include used-car salespeople, mortgage brokers and loan originators, financial institutions and real estate agents. Alternatively, situations where the buyer usually has better information than the seller include estate sales as specified in a last will and testament, life insurance, or sales of old art pieces without a prior professional assessment of their value. This situation was first described by Kenneth J. Arrow in an article on health care in 1963.

George Akerlof, in The Market for Lemons notices that, in such a market, the average value of the consumer product tends to go down, even for those of perfectly good quality. Because of information asymmetry, unscrupulous sellers can sell "forgeries" (like replica goods such as watches) and defraud the buyer. Meanwhile, buyers usually do not have enough information to distinguish lemons from quality goods. As a result, many people not willing to risk getting ripped off will avoid certain types of purchases or will not spend as much for a given item. Akerlof demonstrates that it is even possible for the market to decay to the point of nonexistence.

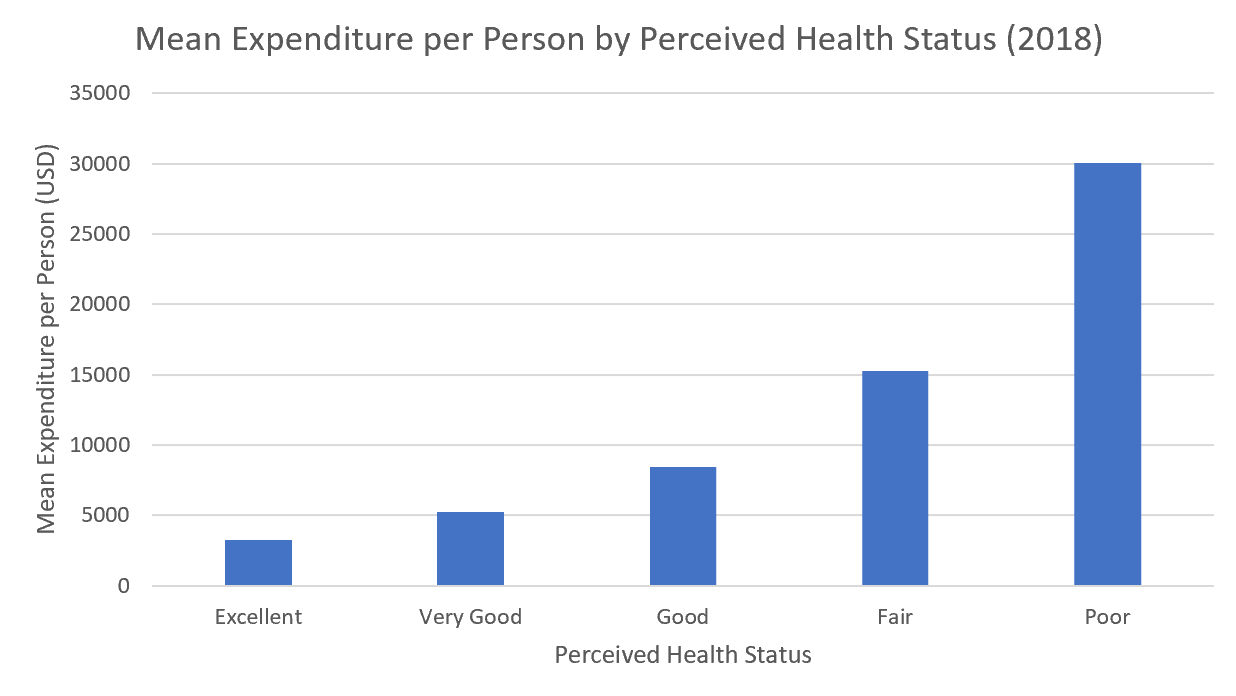
As lower-risk participants leave the pool, expected costs of the pool increase which causes premiums to increase.

An example of adverse selection and information asymmetry causing market failure is the market for health insurance. Policies usually group subscribers together, where people can leave, but no one can join after it is set. As health conditions are realized over time, information involving health costs will arise, and low-risk policyholders will realize the mismatch in the premiums and health conditions. Due to this, healthy policyholders are incentivized to leave and reapply to get a cheaper policy that matches their expected health costs, which causes the premiums to increase. As high-risk policyholders are more dependent on insurance, they are stuck with higher premium costs as the group size reduces, which causes premiums to increase even further. This cycle repeats until the high-risk policy holders also find similar health policies with cheaper premiums, in which the initial group disappears. This concept is known as the death spiral and has been researched as early as 1988.

Akerlof also suggests different methods with which information asymmetry can be reduced. One of those instruments that can be used to reduce the information asymmetry between market participants is intermediary market institutions called counteracting institutions, for instance, guarantees for goods. By providing a guarantee, the buyer in the transaction can use extra time to obtain the same amount of information about the good as the seller before the buyer takes on the complete risk of the good being a "lemon". Other market mechanisms that help reduce the imbalance in information include brand names, chains and franchising that guarantee the buyer a threshold quality level. These mechanisms also let owners of high-quality products get the full value of the goods. These counteracting institutions then keep the market size from reducing to zero.

=== Warranty ===
Warranties are utilised as a method of verifying the credibility of a product and are a guarantee issued by the seller promising to replace or repair the good should the quality not be sufficient. Product warranties are often requested from buying parties or financial lenders and have been used as a form of mediation dating back to the Babylonian era. Warranties can come in the form of insurance and can also come at the expense of the buyer. The implementation of "lemon laws" has eradicated the effect of information asymmetry upon customers who have received a faulty item. Essentially, this involves the customers returning a defective product regardless of circumstances within a certain time period.

=== Mandatory information disclosure ===
Both signaling and screening resemble voluntary information disclosure, where the party having more information, for their own best interest, use various measures to inform the other party. However, voluntary information disclosure is not always feasible. Regulators can thus take active measures to facilitate the spread of information. For example, the Securities and Exchange Commission (SEC) initiated Regulation Fair Disclosure (RFD) so that companies must faithfully disclose material information to investors. The policy has reduced information asymmetry, reflected in the lower trading costs.

=== Incentives and penalties ===
For firms to reduce moral hazard, they can implement penalties for bad behaviour and incentives to align objectives. An example of building in an incentive is insurance companies not insuring customers for the total value; this provides an incentive to be less reckless as the customer will suffer financial liability as well.

== Information gathering ==
Most models in traditional contract theory assume that asymmetric information is exogenously given. Yet, some authors have also studied contract-theoretic models in which asymmetric information arises endogenously because agents decide whether or not to gather information. Specifically, Crémer and Khalil (1992) and Crémer, Khalil, and Rochet (1998a) study an agent's incentives to acquire private information after a principal has offered a contract. In a laboratory experiment, Hoppe and Schmitz (2013) have provided empirical support for the theory. Several further models have been developed which study variants of this setup. For instance, when the agent has not gathered information at the outset, does it make a difference whether or not he learns the information later on, before production starts? What happens if the information can be gathered already before a contract is offered? What happens if the principal observes the agent's decision to acquire information? Finally, the theory has been applied in several contexts, such as public-private partnerships and vertical integration.

== Sources ==
Information asymmetry within societies can be created and maintained in several ways. Firstly, media outlets, due to their ownership structure or political influences, may fail to disseminate certain viewpoints or choose to engage in propaganda campaigns. Furthermore, an educational system relying on substantial tuition fees can generate information imbalances between the poor and the affluent. Imbalances can also be fortified by specific organizational and legal measures, such as document classification procedures or non-disclosure clauses. Exclusive information networks that are operational around the world further contribute to the asymmetry. Copyright laws increase information imbalances between the poor and the affluent. Lastly, mass surveillance helps the political and industrial leaders to amass large volumes of information, which is typically not shared with the rest of society.

== Market impact ==
Zavolokina, Schlegel, and Schwabe (2020) state that Information asymmetry makes buyers and sellers distrust each other, which leads to opportunistic behaviour and may even lead to complete break down of the market. At the same time, lower quality provision in markets is also one of the consequences, as sellers do not get benefits enough to cover their production costs of providing higher quality products.

Countermeasures

- Abito, Jose Miguel, & Salant, Yuval proposed that warranty enhancing consumer welfare highlights the relevance of policies that directly guide consumer decisions and increases buyers' trust in high-quality buyers.
- Establish a real-time information announce platform, according to the collect information to achieve market transparency, eliminate trading concerns thereby.
- Enhance customer experience by third-party quality checks like providing expert reviews.
- Consumer protection law ensure that product quality meets expectations and that contract terms are fair.
- Ensure quality in the form of standards and certificates and prove that all technical parameters have been tested.

== Application in research ==
=== Accounting and finance ===
A substantial portion of research in the field of accounting can be framed in terms of information asymmetry, since accounting involves the transmission of an enterprise's information from those who have it to those who need it for decision-making. Bartov and Bodnar (1996) mentioned that the different accounting methods used by enterprises can lead to information asymmetry. For instance aggressively recognising revenue can result in preparers of financial statements having a much better understanding of the levels of future revenue then those reading the statements. Likewise, in finance literature, the acknowledgment of information asymmetry between organizations challenged the Modigliani–Miller theorem, which states that the valuation of a firm is unaffected by its financial structure. It challenges the theorem as one of the key assumptions is that investors would have the same information as a corporation. If there is not symmetry in information corporations can leverage their capital structure to get the most out of their valuation. Information asymmetry shed light on the importance of aligning interests of managers with those of stakeholders. As managers with significant power from information may make decisions based on their own interest as opposed to the companies. When the level of information asymmetry and associated monitoring cost is high, firms tend to rely less on board monitoring and more on incentive alignment. Various measures are used to align interest of managers to stop them from abusing their power from information asymmetry such as compensating based on performance using a bonus structure. This field of study is referred to as agency theory. Furthermore, financial economists apply information asymmetry in studies of differentially informed financial market participants (insiders, stock analysts, investors, etc.) or in the cost of finance for MFIs.

=== Effect of blogging ===
The effect of blogging as a source of information asymmetry as well as a tool to reduce asymmetric information has also been well studied. Blogging on financial websites provides bottom-up communication among investors, analysts, journalists, and academics, as financial blogs help prevent people in charge from withholding financial information from their company and the general public. Compared to traditional forms of media such as newspapers and magazines, blogging provides an easy-to-access venue for information. A 2013 study by Gregory Saxton and Ashley Anker concluded that more participation on blogging sites from credible individuals reduces information asymmetry between corporate insiders, additionally reducing the risk of insider trading.

=== Game theory ===
A game of imperfect information with sub-games. Here each player will have no information of each other's move while making decisions. This representation is of one person's decisions in a game, however, it does not correspond to the actual timing of the player's decisions. The dashed line between nodes represent information asymmetry and show that, during the game, a party cannot distinguish between the nodes.

Game theory can be used to analyse asymmetric information. A large amount of the foundational ideas in game theory builds on the framework of information asymmetry.

In simultaneous games, each player has no prior knowledge of an opponent's move. In sequential games, players may observe all or part of the opponent's moves. One example of information asymmetry is one player can observe the opponent's past activities while the other player cannot. Therefore, the existence and level of information asymmetry in a game determines the dynamics of the game.

James Fearon in his study of the explanations for war in a game theoretic context notices that war could be a consequence of information asymmetry – two countries will not reach a non-violent settlement because they have incentives to distort the amount of military resources they possess.

=== Contract theory ===
Contract theory provides insights into how various economic agents can enter contractual arrangements in situation of unequal levels of information. The development of contract theory is based on assuming its parties possess different levels of information on the contract's subject. For instance, in a road construction contract, a civil engineer may have more information on the various inputs required to undertake the project, than the other parties. Through contract theory, economic agents gain insights on how they can exploit information available to them, to enter beneficial contractual arrangements. The impact information asymmetry causes among parties with competing interests, such as games, has contributed to game theory. In no game do its players have complete information about each other; most importantly, no player knows the strategy the others intends to use to realize a win. This information asymmetry, together with the competing interests have resulted in the development of game theory (which seeks to provides insights as to how parties caught up in a situation where they are required to compete under a set of rules, can maximize their expected outcomes).

Information asymmetry occurs in situations where some parties have more information regarding an issue than others. It is considered a major cause of market failure. The contribution of information asymmetry to market failure arises from the fact that it impairs with the free hand which is expected to guide how modern markets work. For example, the stock market forms a major avenue through which publicly traded entities can raise their capital. The operation of stock markets across the world, is carried in a way that ensures current and potential investors have the same level of information about the stocks or any other securities that may be listed in that market. That level of information symmetry helps to ensure similar conditions to all parties in the market, which in turn helps to ensure the securities listed in those markets trade at fair value. However, cases of information sometimes arise, when certain parties obtain information that is not in the public domain. This can create market return abnormalities, such as an abrupt surge or decline in a security.

=== Artificial intelligence ===
Tshilidzi Marwala and Evan Hurwitz in their study of the relationship between information asymmetry and artificial intelligence observed that there is a reduced level of information asymmetry between two artificial intelligent agents than between two human agents. As a consequence, when these artificial intelligent agents engage in financial markets it reduces arbitrage opportunities making markets more efficient. The study also revealed that as the number of artificial intelligent agents in the market increase, the volume of trades in the market will decrease. This is primarily because information asymmetry of the perceptions of value of goods and services is the basis of trade.

=== Management ===
Information asymmetry has been applied in a variety of ways in management research ranging from conceptualizations of information asymmetry to building resolutions to reduce it. Studies have shown that information asymmetry can be a source of competitive advantage for the firms. A 2013 study by Schmidt and Keil has revealed that the presence of private information asymmetry within firms influences normal business activities. Firms that have a more concrete understanding of their resources can use this information to gauge their advantage over competitors. In Ozeml, Reuer and Gulati's 2013 study, they found that 'different information' was an additional source of information asymmetry in venture capitalist and alliance networks; when different team members bring diverse, specialized knowledge, values and outlooks towards a common strategic decision, the lack of homogeneous information distribution among the members leads to inefficient decision making.

Firms have the ability to apply strategies that exploit their informational gap. One way they can do this is through impression management, which involves undertaking actions and releasing information to influence stakeholders' and analysts' opinions positively, exploiting information asymmetry as external parties heavily rely on the information released by firms. A second way that firms exploit information asymmetry is through decoupling. This describes the discrepancy between formal procedures and failure to implement them. An example of this is executives announcing a stock repurchase plan without any intention of carrying it out, allowing them to raise new cash flow for their own benefit at the expense of shareholders. Management research goes on to explain that agents can perpetuate information asymmetry through information concealment. This involves firms not sharing information to exploit the informational advantage over rivals. In resource-based theory, it shows firms concealing information about their competitive advantage in order to build causal ambiguity to protect their firm from imitation.

Information asymmetry problems can be addressed by management through several approaches. First is the usage of incentives to encourage the disclosure and sharing information. An example of this is partnering specifically with companies that disclose relatively more information. Second, is through precommitment, where actions are undertaken at present to ensure future commitments. Third, is the usage of an information intermediary in which an intermediary is used to gather and relay information between two parties. A common example of this are financial analysts that gather information from the financial statements of a company, and uses it to create reports and advice for potential investors and clients. Fourth, is the usage of monitoring and reward. Monitoring allows management to confirm information that was previously uncertain, such as performance and behaviour. Monitoring can also be used alongside other incentives such as rewarding for performance.

=== Online advertising ===
Online advertising is a dominant form of advertising, and a potential source of information asymmetry. Online advertising consists of utilities(a good) being encoded into a message received by a customer who decodes the message, making a purchasing decision. Firms' messages are tailored to specific goals and intentions, and can be a source of information asymmetry due to interpretation, or intent. The nature of the internet and prevalence of social media in society has given firms opportunities to create promotional content in a less passive way than other forms of advertising. 'Noise' represents any techniques that are used with the intent of obstructing, altering, or blocking the interpretation of the message by the receiver. This can increase the amount of information asymmetry in a transaction, as the buyer may not understand the product to its fullest extent, even if they believe to fully understand the message being sent to them.

Firms communicate to the virtual marketplace through online advertising, and as such the feedback of consumers feeling manipulated or feeling the presence of information asymmetry may be indicative of the lack of transparency by a firm. Highly advertised and strongly promoted items are generally more likely to be bought by customers, even if the product is inferior to less advertised competition, introducing adverse selection. The power of the internet also changes how consumers deal with information asymmetry, as they have the means to find vast amounts of information about products with relatively little effort. While a consumer can use this power to assist their research to find a product that is not being marketed maliciously, this decision is made due to information asymmetry, not due to the customer being perfectly rational.

Some consumers are aware of the usage of strategies and techniques by firms to advertise and influence their media consumption, however do not necessarily alter their trust in the source of the information accordingly. Online advertising that appears trustworthy but can be malicious in intent can still be trusted by consumers, despite the information asymmetry, even if consumers themselves identify as critical of the medium. Social media personalities, much like other celebrities, also have influence over consumers who would otherwise consider themselves dissuaded by the advertising, providing firms another method of aggressive advertising with potential information asymmetry.

== See also ==
- Artificial scarcity
- Asymmetric competition
- Barriers to entry
- Bounded rationality
- Caveat emptor
- Ecologically unequal exchange
- Freedom of contract
- Inequality of bargaining power
- Just price
- Natural borrowing limit
- Perfect information
- Real prices and ideal prices
