= Confusopoly =

Intentionally confusing marketing

Confusopoly (aka Dilbert's confusopoly) is confusing marketing designed to prevent the buyer from making informed decisions. The term was invented by Scott Adams in his comic strip Dilbert. Adams defined a confusopoly as "a group of companies with similar products who intentionally confuse customers instead of competing on price". For example, similar items like mobile phones are advertised at various price plans according to different combinations of available minutes, text messaging capabilities and other services, thus making these offers practically incomparable when it could be easy to price similar units of usage to allow informed comparisons. The term confusopoly also applies because confusion within the targeted consumer group is purposefully maintained, so choices are based on emotional factors.

In reality, the mobile phone market is a perfect example of Dilbert's confusopoly. That is, various price propositions are on offer with different combinations of free minutes, texts, and other services, whilst in reality the same level of usage would result in roughly the same cost, leaving the user so confused that they simply choose the product with the name they like the most—a fact most notably recognised by the operator Orange with their animal-themed tariffs, such as Dolphin and Raccoon, and by LG who give their phones names such as Chocolate and Shine. Indeed, there has been a recent trend to take this a step further with co-branding of phones such as LG's Prada, and Samsung's Armani offerings.

The term has been adopted by economists. Consumer Financial Protection Bureau director Richard Cordray, championing meaningful regulation for the financial industry, used the term confusopoly to refer to large financial institutions (Cordray 2014, 4'04"4'26"):

There's actually an economic term for this; it's called "Confusopoly." If [the sellers] can confuse the consumer enough then the consumers won't necessarily know what choice they're making and they can be talked into just about anything.

— Richard Cordray, 2014/1/08

== See also ==
- The Dilbert Future
- "The Market for Lemons" and lemon laws
- The sexual interference hypothesis is a comparable phenomenon, involving display and mate choice, that occurs in biological systems.
- Dark patterns
