= Drip pricing =

Marketing pricing tactic

In online retail, drip pricing (also known as partitioned pricing or shrouded pricing) is a sales technique where a headline price is advertised at the beginning of the purchase process, followed by the incremental disclosure of additional fees, taxes or charges. The objective of drip pricing is to gain a consumer's interest in a misleadingly low headline price without the true final price being disclosed until the consumer has invested time and effort in the purchase process and made a decision to purchase.

Drip pricing is controversial because it can deceive consumers and distort competition by making it difficult for businesses with more transparent pricing practices to compete on a level playing field. Many jurisdictions have enacted legislation to outlaw drip pricing of fees, taxes and surcharges. For example, throughout the European Economic Area and most of the rest of Europe, retailers must include value added tax in prices given to consumers. Article 22 of Directive 2011/83/EU on Consumer Rights outlaws the default selection of additional drip-priced charges such as pre-ticked boxes on websites; in the United Kingdom, this is enacted under Regulation 40 of the Consumer Contracts Regulations 2013.

Industries where partitioned pricing has historically been prevalent include air transportation, lodging, auto dealerships, auction houses, online retailing, and sports and entertainment ticketing. Studies show that consumers spend more when price tags are tax-exclusive than tax-inclusive.

== Effectiveness ==
Studies consistently show that consumers spend more when price tags are tax-exclusive.

Tversky and Kahneman’s research suggests that the reason for drip pricing being so effective is due to consumers anchoring on to what matters to them, for example the base price, and consider that the main factor when purchasing a product or service. They then take less recognition of the smaller prices, such as surcharges and therefore underestimate the total price as they are still considering the base price as a good deal.

Xia and Monroes' research suggests that a small surcharge, for example 6% of the total price, would have a positive effect on the consumer's purchasing intentions as well as satisfaction as opposed to a high surcharge, for example 12%. However, this research also pointed out that even with the high surcharge of 12%, the consumer's purchasing intentions did not change, even if their satisfaction levels did. This suggests evidence that drip pricing could be an effective pricing strategy, as it lures consumers in with a low base price and adds smaller charges, which the consumer does not recognize, as they are focused on the base price. Even if drip pricing does not have positive impact on the satisfaction levels of consumers, it is clear that a company could extract higher charges from a consumer with similar, if not same, levels of purchase intentions.

== By industry sector ==
=== Airlines ===
Drip pricing of unavoidable additional charges on air fares is outlawed in the European Economic Area, Australia, and the United States.

The United States Department of Transportation regulation known as the Full Fare Advertising Rule requiring advertisements to include all applicable taxes, fees, and return tickets took effect on January 26, 2012. That July, the agency fined Tripadvisor $80,000 for non-compliance. In October, 2022, USDOT proposed adding regulations for transparency on ancillary fees like baggage, and requested public comment.

European regulations requires that "The final price to be paid shall at all times be indicated and shall include the applicable air fare or air rate as well as all applicable taxes, and charges, surcharges and fees which are unavoidable and foreseeable at the time of publication". In the early 2010s, many budget airlines sought to circumvent this requirement by adding surcharges for the most common means of payment. For example, Ryanair surcharged £6 per passenger per flight segment to process a single debit card payment whose cost was only a few pence. Article 19 of EU Consumer Rights Directive has limited such payment surcharges to "the cost borne by the trader" since 13 June 2014, but because of the prevalence of these surcharges, the United Kingdom enacted the legislation earlier than required with effect from 6 April 2013. Later legislation prohibits card surcharges throughout the EEA with effect from 13 January 2018, which the United Kingdom also enacted.

In mid-2014, the Australian Competition & Consumer Commission took legal action against Virgin Australia and Jetstar in respect of drip pricing.

After being faced with increasing regulation of the types of surcharges that may be drip-priced, airlines have created new types of drip-priced surcharges. For example Spirit Airlines from August 2010 and Wizz Air from October 2012 started surcharging passengers who travel with conventionally-sized hand luggage. Following Ryanair's introduction of allocated seating in February 2014, it and other UK-based airlines have been accused of seating young children far away from their parents unless a surcharge is paid. This is despite the UK's Civil Aviation Authority guidelines stating that airlines' seat allocation procedures should aim to seat children close to their parents.

An example of airlines' drip pricing is when "You click on 'Book Now' and enter your personal information. Just as you are about to finish the transaction, you see that the payment with your preferred credit card costs an additional US$20".

=== Event ticketing ===
The primary and secondary ticketing industry has faced considerable scrutiny in the United Kingdom. Many event organisers and secondary ticketing agencies, in addition to any published markup contained within the headline price, add unavoidable delivery fees for tickets later in the purchase process, even when customers print their own tickets or collect them from a box office.

=== Hotel and resort booking agents ===
Cities in many southern European countries, such as Greece, Italy and Spain, impose a city tax on guests staying in hotels. Booking agents often exclude the city tax from the quoted headline price, leaving the hotel guest to pay the tax locally upon check-out.

In May 2012, the United States Federal Trade Commission hosted a conference on the economics of drip pricing, which focused on the practice of charging "hotel" or "resort" fees to consumers after they arrive to check-in at their hotel or resort. Following the conference, the FTC issued letters against 22 hotel operators warning that their online reservation sites may "violate the law by providing a deceptively low estimate of what consumers can expect to pay for their hotel rooms". According to the FTC letters, "One common complaint consumers raised involved mandatory fees hotels charge for amenities such as newspapers, use of onsite exercise or pool facilities, or internet access, sometimes referred to as 'resort fees.' These mandatory fees can be as high as $30 per night, a sum that could certainly affect consumer purchasing decisions". The warning letters also stated that consumers often did not know they would be required to pay resort fees in addition to the quoted hotel rate.

In 2017, the FTC published an extensive report which further detailed the practice of unfair and deceptive drip pricing practices in the hotel and resort industries. The report found that "separating mandatory resort fees from posted room rates without first disclosing the total price is likely to harm consumers by artificially increasing the search costs and the cognitive costs of finding and booking hotel accommodations."

=== Airbnb ===
When Airbnb customers search for accommodation, Airbnb displays per-night prices that exclude its own per-night service charges, and the total price is not revealed until the customer selects an individual property. Furthermore, if the customer searches for properties within a price range, the search returns properties where only part of the price falls within the desired price range rather than where the total price falls within the price range. In late 2015, the Australian Competition & Consumer Commission took action against Airbnb for this form of drip pricing. Consequently users of Airbnb's Australian web site now see the total price of a stay including all unavoidable charges at every stage of the booking process. In July 2018, the European Commission threatened action against Airbnb in view of its website breaching EU law by headline prices failing to include fees and charges later passed on to the consumer, including cleaning costs.

=== Economy-wide regulations ===
In October 2022, the United States Federal Trade Commission announced a proposed rulemaking on the practice, and requested public input.

== Ethics ==
"We find that that consumers perceive drip prices as unfair." This is the issue when it comes to price drip strategy. Is it fair to show a lower price and slowly add additional costs towards the end of a transaction? Research goes on to show that consumers disapprove of the way that the prices are being presented. This can have a negative impact on the purchase itself as if consumers feel they are being treated unfairly due to drip pricing strategy, they may consider substitute goods and services.

== Economic effects ==
A 2019 paper by economists Michael R. Baye and John Morgan found that drip price harms even fully rational consumers and suppliers, because it imposes hassle costs (i.e., "the time and effort required to discover the total price"); "industry-wide drip pricing can raise average prices, increase industry profits, and harm consumers."

Search friction inhibits consumers from obtaining sufficient market information to make an informed decision, an effect which is amplified by drip pricing. When drip pricing is employed, a competitive market is insufficient to mitigate the additional search friction consumers experience. Drip pricing is a method used to isolate and restrict competitive forces to the base price only, with minimal competition influence on additional charges.

== See also ==
- Dark pattern
- Foot-in-the-door technique
- Junk fee
- Resort fee
