= Resort fee =

Fee a guest is charged by an accommodation provider

A resort fee, also called a facility fee, a destination fee, an amenity fee, an urban fee, a resort charge, or a hidden hotel booking fee, is an additional fee that a guest is charged by an accommodation provider, usually calculated on a per day basis, in addition to a base room rate.

Resort fees originated in North America. Though mostly found in tourist destinations in the United States, some resorts in Mexico and the Caribbean now also charge resort fees. A handful of hotels in Canada have also taken up the practice.

In many countries, it is illegal to charge additional fees not disclosed at the time of booking, and the fees are currently being legally challenged in the United States.

== United States practice ==
In the United States, resort fees have been a contentious practice. Currently, hotel resort fees can be viewed as illegal based on existing state consumer protection laws.

Numerous bodies have authority on this issue in the United States, including the U.S. Congress, state legislatures, the Federal Trade Commission, and the National Association of Attorneys General. To date, 50 attorneys general have opened an investigation into hotel resort fees. Marriott was issued a subpoena on June 6, 2017, by the Attorney General of Washington, D.C., regarding their non-cooperation in the investigation, as the hospitality industry continues to stall any legislative solution to the issue. Since then the Attorneys General of DC, Nebraska, Pennsylvania and Texas have taken action against hotel resort fees. Non-profit consumer protection group Travelers United sued MGM, Hilton, Hyatt and Sonesta. The FTC announced a notice of proposed rule making in 2022 and US President Biden talked of hotel resort fees in his 2023 State of the Union. The FTC released its proposed rule on junk fees on October 11, 2023, and in the FTC's press release it specifically highlighted hotel booking fees and resort fees.

=== Background ===
In 1997, some resort hotels began to charge a mandatory resort fee, regardless of which facilities were used by guests. Advertising a room without including the resort fee in the price enables the hotel to advertise a lower room rate than the actual price of the room.

Resort fees were previously found just in tourist locations at actual resorts. Still, they are common throughout the United States in exclusive resort destinations and at two-star hotels in American cities. The fees are usually seen as a nuisance and a scam by travelers. They also affect international tourists who are unfamiliar with the breakdown of a US hotel bill and may not speak English.

Resort fees are most commonly charged in tourist areas, where there is collusion, with all hotels deciding to charge such fees. Currently, resort fees apply to almost all 62,000 rooms on the Las Vegas Strip. Resort fees, along with the recent introduction of parking charges (neither of which are typically charged at the numerous alternative gaming locations in the United States), are believed to be a significant cause of a reduction in tourism to Las Vegas.

Resort fees may also be charged by budget hotels. For example, the Days Inn in Miami Beach and the Super 8 in Las Vegas are two-star hotels that charge resort fees. Econo Lodges around Orlando have begun to charge resort fees.

The average resort fee in the United States is $42.41, about 11% of the overall cost to stay at the hotel each night. This is a nightly charge on top of the advertised room rate.

New York City has seen a surge in hotel resort fees. In New York City, the fees are often called destination fees, facility fees or amenity fees. There were 15 hotels in New York City with resort fees in 2016. In 2018 there were 84. By 2020, there were over 125.

=== Objections ===
Consumer advocates describe the fee as paying a second hidden room rate. The average resort fee in 2015 was $24.93 per day (equivalent to $34 in 2025). It can be more than the advertised cost of the room. There is no limit to what the resort fee can be. Two hotels in Florida have resort fees of over $100 per day. Many hotels in Las Vegas advertise room rates that are lower than the resort fee, causing the total price to be more than double the advertised price.

The practice is widely known as drip pricing, particularly in consumer rights contexts. One price is advertised to attract customers, but when a customer checks in, there are then mandatory fees, taxes, and other charges that incrementally drip beyond the price initially advertised.

Consumers have criticized resort fees for not being fairly disclosed prior to booking accommodation. Consumer advocates argue that hotels lie when they claim the fee pays for any services.

Katherine Lugar, former president and chief executive officer of the American Hotel and Lodging Association, said, "throughout the booking process, hotels are transparent about costs, fees and taxes.” That assertion has been challenged by consumer advocates. They argue that though hotels may list a resort fee, they do so at the very end of the booking process in extremely small print. Charlie Leocha, president of Travelers United, said, "The charging of mandatory resort fees by hotels results in a misrepresentation of the true price of the hotel room."

Hotels often try to hide the fee as a tax. A resort fee is not a tax. The Arizona Grand Resort & Spa listed its resort fee as a tax. The Life Hotel in New York City lists their fee as an "NYC mandatory City Hotel Fee."

Consumer advocates have noted that if consumers choose to book their hotel based on price-based search tools on Expedia, Priceline, or Hotel Tonight, the resort fees are left off in the initial price comparison search. A hotel could be anywhere from $10 to $50 more expensive per night, but it is not listed with the advertised price.

A Priceline spokeswoman, Flavie Lemarchand-Wood, said the practice of tacking added fees onto the advertised price after a hotel is selected is not deceptive: "We are compliant in disclosing the fees prior to purchase. It is very important [for the consumer] to read everything on the page". Expedia, Priceline and Hotel Tonight do not take a commission from the resort fee. These online booking companies have no incentive to publish the resort fee. The hotel takes the entire resort fee. These companies are further disincentivized since if one site begins to add the resort fee to the advertised rate, it will look like the price on that site is higher and consumers would go to a competing online booking site.

Consumer groups such as Travelers United and Kill Resort Fees contend if a hotel charges a mandatory fee, it should be included in the nightly room rate. Hotel rating systems, such as AAA, have deducted points from a hotel being reviewed if they charge resort fees. AAA has said resort fees are a major annoyance of travelers. Frommer's travel guides have come out with numerous articles against hotel resort fees.

=== Benefit to hotels ===
The major benefit to the hotels is the profit, while still being able to show 'reasonable' room prices to the public. Resort fees brought in $2.47 billion to the hotel industry in 2015. MGM Resorts International stated that, for Las Vegas hotel rooms in 2011, "Our RevPAR (revenue per available room) in the first quarter was up 16%, including resort fees. Excluding resort fees, REVPAR was up 11% in the quarter year-over-year."

Online hotel search and booking tools like Expedia, Travelocity and Hotel Tonight take a percentage of a reservation and then pass the reservation on to the hotel. A hotel loses a certain percentage from every reservation made on one of the sites. Hotels that charge resort fees but are listed on these hotel search and booking sites list only their advertised rate and not their resort fee. That is because the hotel booking site takes a percentage of that advertised rate. When the hotel collects the resort fee at check in, separately from the rate purchased for online, the hotel collects 100% of that charge.

Resort fees also affect travel agents. Travel agents can earn commission on the advertised rate of the hotel and do not collect a percentage of taxes or fees. Furthermore, travel agencies must legally know what the resort fee for each hotel is so that they can properly pass it on to their clients. Failure to do so could result in a lawsuit to their agency. Individual travel agents have found it difficult to keep up with changing hotel resort fees. The American Society of Travel Advisors (ASTA) launched an advocacy campaign to support the federal bi-partisan bill to end undisclosed hotel resort fees in October 2019.

Hotels also benefit by offering a free room that is not free. Hotels and resorts also often collect resort fees from guests who are paying for their stay with loyalty points, since the resort fee is categorized a mandatory charge for bundled services as opposed to part of the room rate. In gambling locations, rooms are often comped for guests who are frequent gamblers. These hotels may offer a "comped" room but still charge a resort fee so the room is not complimentary at all.

=== Benefit to consumers ===
The American Hotel and Lodging Association has stated that the resort fee provides many benefits to consumers. Hotels say that customers like many features and amenities of the hotel to be included in the resort fee to avoid nickel and diming, but there is no proof that any services are included in the fees, which leads many consumers to deem it to be dishonest pricing.

MGM Resorts International senior vice president Alan Feldman has said, "We have heard negative feedback from guests, but we’ve also heard positive feedback, from guests who are happy that they are no longer paying à la carte for different services. They don’t feel nickeled and dimed."

The American Hotel and Lodging Association said that resort fees pay for a range of hotel amenities, such as pool use, gym access, towel services, Wi-Fi, newspapers, shuttle service, daily parking. They state that the resort fee is a payment for a group of services. This is the hotel taking advantage of its customers, because it will charge the fee even if the guest does not want any of those services. There is no way to opt out of a supposedly optional fee-for-services arrangement.

Consumer advocates such as the National Consumers League and Travelers United have stated that since it is a mandatory fee, it is not an exchange of service. A guest could decline all of the services allegedly offered by the resort fee and still be forced to pay the resort fee. The advocates state that there is no exchange of service. It is simply an additional amount that the hotel collects, on top of the advertised room rate.

Most hotels tax the resort fee at the hotel occupancy tax rate. This is a tax rate reserved for hotel room rates. Services are taxed at the sales tax rate in the United States. The hotel occupancy tax is higher than the sales tax rate. Consumer advocates argue this shows that the hotel resort fee is considered part of the room rate for the hotel and for tax purposes, not an exchange of service. A direct exchange of service, such as a hotel charge of bringing an extra bed to the room, would always be taxed at sales tax. A resort fee is normally not taxed as an exchange of service, but as a second room rate.

=== Taxes ===
Since resort fees are not included in the advertised room rates, the fee can be taxed differently from the regular room rates. Resort fees in Nevada are treated and taxed as a hotel room at hotel occupancy tax. Both hotel rooms and resort fees in Nevada are taxed at 13.38%. Resort fees at many hotels in New York are taxed at 8.875% instead of the hotel occupancy tax of 14.75%. There is a 5.875% tax loss for New York City per resort fee per room per night. Consumer advocates estimate that hotel resort fees in New York City cause $10 million of lost tax revenue annually.

=== Lawsuits ===
There has been an ongoing 50 state Attorneys General investigation into hotel resort fees for many years. Marriott was issued a subpoena on June 6, 2017, by the Attorney General of Washington, D.C., regarding their non-cooperation in the investigation.

In July 2019 the Attorney General of Washington, D.C., sued Marriott arguing that hotel resort fees violate Washington, DC's Consumer Protection Procedure's Act.

In July 2019 the Attorney General of Nebraska sued Hilton arguing that hotel resort fees violate Nebraska's Consumer Protection Act and Nebraska's Uniform Deceptive Trade Practices Act.

In February 2021, Travelers United sued MGM Resorts International arguing that hotel resort fees violate Washington, DC's Consumer Protection Procedures Act. They also raised the issue of resort fees being charged on "comps" and resort fees being charged in a pandemic.

In November 2021, the Attorney General of Pennsylvania came to a settlement with Marriott that promises to "unmask resort fees." Almost immediately after this announcement, multiple Marriott properties started to add an undisclosed "sustainability fee."

In May 2023, the Texas Attorney General filed a lawsuit against Hyatt Hotels for "violating Texas consumer protection laws by marketing hotel rooms at prices that were not available to the public as advertised." The press release stated that "Hyatt implemented this practice by charging consumers mandatory and unavoidable fees-such as resort fees, destination fees, or amenity fees-in addition to daily room rates."

On May 16, 2023, the Texas Attorney General announced that he had entered "into a settlement with Marriott International, Inc. ("Marriott") to ensure that the global hotel company properly discloses "resort fees" and other hidden costs to consumers in its advertisements and during the room booking process."

The Texas Attorney General sued Booking Holdings for "engaging in false, misleading, or deceptive acts and practices in violation of the Texas Deceptive Trade Practices Act." They announced the lawsuit on August 10, 2023.

In August 2023, Travelers United sued Hyatt Hotels and Sonesta over their use of hotel resort fees.

On September 21, 2023, the Pennsylvania Attorney General announced that her office had reached a multi-state settlement with Choice Hotels International regarding the disclosure of "resort fees" and "drip pricing."

In September 2023, Travelers United sued Hilton Hotels over their use of hotel resort fees.

=== The White House ===
US President Biden targeted resort fees in the 2023 State of the Union. He stated "We're going to ban surprise resort fees that hotels charge on your bill. Those fees can cost you up to $90 a night at hotels that aren't even resorts."

The White House under Biden had been taking on junk fees as a policy issue since 2022. On October 26, 2022, the White House released a statement stating "last month, at a meeting of the White House Competition Council, President Biden called on all agencies to reduce or eliminate hidden fees, charges, and add-ons for everything from banking services to cable and internet bills to airline and concert tickets. These so called "junk fees" are not just an irritant - they can weaken market competition, raise costs for consumers and businesses, and hit the most vulnerable Americans the hardest."

=== Federal Trade Commission ===
The Federal Trade Commission (FTC) is the US government organization with authority to regulate the hotel industry. On the subject of resort fees in 2012, FTC attorney Mamie Kresses said "The fees are not illegal as long as they're disclosed." What constitutes a clear disclosure, however, has been a matter of debate between the hotel industry and consumers. In 2012, FTC advised 22 hotel operators that their online rate quote totals, which did not include certain fees, may need to be updated to comply with FTC regulations.

Since then the FTC has taken no legal action on resort fees. Consumer advocate Chris Elliott wrote "The FTC has failed to protect consumers from what is perhaps the most dishonest fee in the travel industry." In 2016, FTC Chairperson Ramirez wrote a letter to Congress on the subject of resort fees and said “in my view……the most efficient and effective means to mandate the type of industry-wide requirement you propose would be through legislation.”

FTC published a report on the harm of resort fees on January 5, 2017, which concluded "that consumers are likely being harmed by the hotel industry practice of disclosing mandatory resort fees separate from posted room rates, without first disclosing the total price."

The FTC announced that it will explore a rule to crack down on junk fees (such as hotel resort fees) on October 20, 2022. This was announced in an advance notice of proposed rulemaking. Six days later on October 26, 2022, FTC Chair Lina Khan stood onstage with President Biden announcing a national crackdown on junk fees such as "hidden hotel booking fees."

=== Consumer Financial Protection Bureau ===
On February 2, 2022, the Consumer Financial Protection Bureau requested public comment about how junk fees were impacting peoples financial lives. On October 26, 2022, Director Rohit Chopra stood onstage with President Biden announcing a national crackdown on junk fees such as "hidden hotel booking fees."

=== Congress ===
US Senator McCaskill introduced the “Truth in Hotel Advertising Act of 2016” in the US Senate on February 25, 2016. The purpose of the bill is to "prohibit unfair and deceptive advertising of hotel room rates, and for other purposes." The bill was not voted on during the 114th Congress.

A bipartisan bill was introduced by Congressmembers Eddie Bernice Johnson and Jeff Fortenberry to the US House of Representatives on September 25, 2019. The bill was introduced by Congressmember Eddie Bernice Johnson in 2022. Congressmember Paul Gosar introduced a different bill also directed at eliminating hotel resort fees in 2022.

On July 26, 2023, the Hotel Fees Transparency Act was introduced to the US Senate by Senator Amy Klobuchar (D-MN) and Senator Jerry Moran (R-KS).

=== Challenges to resort fees ===
Many consumers have begun to challenge resort fees. This has been done by asking the hotel desk manager to remove the fee, by disputing the fee with the guest's credit card company, by suing the hotel in small claims court or by filing a consumer complaint with one's Attorney General.

Consumer travel advocate Christopher Elliott advises anyone who was blindsided by an add-on fee to dispute the charge with their credit card company. While the booking sites may allow small-print disclosures, some credit card companies have taken the consumer's side in these disputes and reversed the charges. Moreover, merchants that have a high volume of disputed charges can run afoul of credit card providers, which in egregious cases have the ability to terminate a vendor's right to accept credit cards.

Kill Resort Fees, an advocacy group working to eliminate resort fees, stated that all resort fees should be challenged. Lauren Wolfe, founder of Kill Resort Fees, said that "Resort fees are the equivalent of being charged a second room rate. No law exists protecting hotels ability to charge two room rates for one night so all of these second rates also known as resort fees should be challenged by consumers." Wolfe advocates that consumers should file a consumer complaint with their attorney general to have their AG force the hotel to refund the customer.

=== Legal action in the United States ===
Fifty Attorneys General began an investigation into the practice of hotel resort fees in May 2016. Marriott resisted turning over documents on the investigation after many requests by the Attorneys General. Marriott was subpoenaed on June 7, 2017, by the District of Columbia Attorney General Karl Racine. The subpoena reads:

"D.C. Code 1-301.89c(a) provides that the Office of the Attorney General 'shall have the authority to issue subpoenas for the production of documents and materials or for the attendance and testimony of witnesses under oath, or both, related to an investigation into unfair, deceptive, unconscionable, or fraudulent trade practices by or between a merchant or consumer, as defined in 28-3901.' Consistent with that authority, on May 16, 2016, the District served its subpoena on Marriott"

Wyndham is currently facing a class action lawsuit in Pennsylvania Federal Court regarding hotel resort fees. Luca v. Wyndham Worldwide Corp. et al., case number 2:16-cv-00746, in the U.S. District Court for the Western District of Pennsylvania deals with and Wyndham its subsidiaries are sneaking a resort fee on to its room prices without notifying consumers, causing its rooms to be advertised at deceptively low rates, according to a proposed class action filed Monday in Pennsylvania federal court. The case reads:

“Defendants’ failure to adequately disclose the resort fee charge as part of the true cost of renting a hotel room is deceptive and causes consumers, including plaintiff and the class, to believe that they are paying substantially less than they actually are being charged for a room at defendants’ hotels,” according to the complaint."

Most hotels that have resort fees say the fee provides internet access. In most locations, the hotel resort fee is taxed sales tax or hotel occupancy tax. Some have argued that Internet access cannot be taxed at either of these tax rates due to the Internet Tax Freedom Act. New York State is explicit in saying hotels and motels cannot tax Internet access. Numerous hotels are being sued over their claim that resort fees provide Internet access.

=== Organizations advocating for the ability of hotels to charge resort fees ===
- American Hotel and Lodging Association
- American Gaming Association

=== Organizations advocating against resort fees ===
- Kill Resort Fees
- Travelers United
- National Consumers League
- Consumer Reports
- Consumer Federation of America

== Locations where resort fees are illegal ==
=== Europe ===
European Union regulations say that mandatory fees must be included in advertised prices, making hidden resort fees illegal.
