= Debt limit =

Legislative mechanism restricting borrowing

A debt limit or debt ceiling is a legislative mechanism restricting the total amount that a country can borrow or how much debt it can be permitted to take on. Several countries have debt limitation restrictions.

== Description ==
A debt limit is a legislative mechanism restricting the total amount that a country can borrow or how much debt it can be permitted to take on. It is usually set as percentage of GDP, but in a few cases as an absolute amount (for example, $200 billion).

== Use ==
Several countries have debt limitation laws in place.

Only Denmark and the United States have a debt ceiling that is set at an absolute amount rather than a percentage of GDP. The US Congress began using the measure in 1917 and modified the financing law in 1939 to give the treasury more flexibility in issuing debt. In Denmark, a debt ceiling became necessary in 1993 as a constitutional waiver when day-to-day responsibility for the public debt was transferred to the National Bank from the Ministry of Finance. It is regarded as a legal formality and consequently a broad consensus in the Danish Parliament has set the limit much higher than the actual debt, making the limit irrelevant (it has been raised once, in 2010 when the debt had reached about two-thirds the limit, the nearest it has ever been, at which point the limit was more than doubled).

Limits as a percentage of GDP are more widespread. Poland has a constitutional limit on public debt, set at 60% of GDP; by law, a budget cannot pass with a breach in place. Examples of other countries that have debt limits as a percentage of GDP are Kenya, Malaysia, Namibia and Pakistan. As part of the Maastricht Treaty, all member states of the European Union (except the United Kingdom, which had a treaty opt-out from the EMU rules while being a member), have since 1992 pledged via treaty legislation and European Union law to keep their general government debt below 60% of GDP (or on a sufficiently slowly declining trajectory towards respecting the 60% limit at some point in the future) and their annual general government budget deficit below 3% of GDP (or if above it need to be corrected with a sufficiently acceptable declining speed over the following few years). A revision of the EU debt rule and deficit rule is planned (also known as the Stability and Growth Pact), although when this revision was agreed and adopted in spring 2024, it was only minor - as no changes were made to the overall treaty legislation - with changes only agreed upon to the SGP related Regulations defining how fast and flexible countries shall correct a potential excessive deficit or debt level towards respecting the treaty defined maximum 60% of GDP debt level and 3% of GDP budget deficit level in the future.

Between 2007 and 2013, Australia had a debt ceiling, which limited how much the Australian government could borrow. The debt ceiling was contained in section 5(1) of the Commonwealth Inscribed Stock Act 1911 until its repeal on 10 December 2013. The statutory limit was created in 2007 by the Rudd government and set at $75 billion. It was increased in 2009 to $200 billion, $250 billion in 2011 and $300 billion in May 2012. In November 2013, Treasurer Joe Hockey requested Parliament's approval for an increase in the debt limit from $300 billion to $500 billion, saying that the limit will be exhausted by mid-December 2013. With the support of the Australian Greens, the Abbott government repealed the debt ceiling over the opposition of the Australian Labor Party.

== See also ==
- Debt brake (Germany)
- List of countries by public debt
- Natural borrowing limit
