= Monopoly Junior =

Board game

- Publishers: Parker Brothers; Waddingtons
- Players: 2 to 4
- Setup time: < 5 minutes
- Playing time: < 30 min
- Chance: High
- Age range: 5 to 8
- Skills: Dice rolling counting

Monopoly Junior is a simplified version of the board game Monopoly, designed for young children, which was originally released in 1990. It has a rectangular board that is smaller than the standard game and rather than using street names it is based on a city's amusements (a zoo, a video game arcade, a pizzeria, etc.) to make the game more child-friendly. There are many different models of the game.

== History ==
Parker Brothers began producing Monopoly Junior in 1990, explicitly marketed for players aged five to eight, with a simplified board and game play as compared to the standard Monopoly game. The Monopoly Junior board was based on a fair's midway, and featured 16 "amusements" rather than 28 properties. Players chose a car token in one of four colors (red roller coaster car, blue bumper car, green flume and yellow carousel horse), and used corresponding colored "ticket booths" (hotel pieces from the standard Monopoly game) to denote ownership of the amusements in lieu of title deeds. The game play mechanics are the same as the standard game: players roll a die (a single die, rather than two dice) and move their token clockwise around the board the number of spaces corresponding to the rolled die.

When players land on a vacant amusement they must purchase the amusement for the price shown on the board; the player cannot decline to buy the amusement, and there is no auction. However, as in the standard game, if players have enough money to buy, but not the exact amount or bill, the banker (who also plays) can make change. Amusements cannot be improved with houses or hotels as in the standard Monopoly game. When a player lands on an amusement owned by an opponent they must pay their opponent an entrance fee equivalent to the value of the amusement marked on the board. If a player lands on one of a pair of amusements of the same color owned by the same player they must pay their opponent double the value of the amusement they landed on. Play continues until only one of the players is bankrupted; the player with the most cash on hand wins.

In 2013, the game was revised with the board now based on a simplified version of a city rather than a midway. The player tokens were replaced with a green car, a blue boat, an orange cat, and a black dog. The ticket booths were replaced with "sold signs", cardboard pieces featuring cartoon caricatures of the player tokens. The $1, $2, $3, $4 and $5 notes were replaced with single-denomination "Monopoly money" notes, and the prices on the board were denoted with a Monopoly money currency glyph (an uppercase 'M' with two horizontal crossbars) instead of dollars or pounds. The board became more reminiscent of the standard Monopoly board, replacing the "Rest Rooms" (or "Café", depending on the version of the board) with "Jail" and "Uncle Pennybag's Loose Change" with "Free Parking". The four Railroad spaces, the Fireworks space, the Water Show and two Chance spaces were also eliminated, reducing the board size from 32 spaces to 24.

== Board ==
Standard (North American Edition) Monopoly Junior board layout as of 2023

| Free Parking | Ferris Wheel $3 | Roller Coaster $3 | Chance | Toy Store $3 | Pet Store $3 | Go to Jail |
| Swimming Pool $2 | MONOPOLY Junior | | | | | Aquarium $4 |
| Go-Karts $2 | MONOPOLY Junior | | | | | The Zoo $4 |
| Chance | MONOPOLY Junior | | | | | Chance |
| Library $2 | MONOPOLY Junior | | | | | Park Place $5 |
| Museum $2 | MONOPOLY Junior | | | | | Boardwalk $5 |
| Jail | Ice Cream Parlor $2 | Bakery $2 | Chance | Pizza House $1 | Taco Truck $1 | Collect $2 salary as you pass GO |

Some space names on the British version of the board have different names, similar to the British version of the original Monopoly board: "Park Lane" instead of "Park Place", and "Mayfair" instead of "Boardwalk", etc.

Monopoly Junior board layout (1990)

| Uncle Pennybag's Loose Change | Chance | Video Arcade $3 | Haunted House $3 | Chance | Blue Line Railroad (Roll Again) | Helicopter Ride $4 | Pony Ride $4 | Pay $2 to see the water show | Chance | Pay $3 To Take The Tramway To The Rest Rooms |
| Miniature Golf $3 | MONOPOLY Junior | | | | | | | | | Bumper Cars $4 |
| Water Slide $3 | MONOPOLY Junior | | | | | | | | | Ferris Wheel $4 |
| Green Line Railroad (Roll Again) | MONOPOLY Junior | | | | | | | | | Red Line Railroad (Roll Again) |
| Paddle Boats $2 | MONOPOLY Junior | | | | | | | | | Loop The Loop $5 |
| Merry-Go-Round $2 | MONOPOLY Junior | | | | | | | | | Roller Coaster $5 |
| Rest Rooms | Chance | Pay $2 to see the fireworks | Magic Show $2 | Puppet Show $2 | Yellow Line Railroad (Roll Again) | Chance | Cotton Candy $1 | Balloon Stand $1 | Chance | Collect $2 allowance as you pass GO |

Several of the space names are changed to British English terms on the British version of the board: "Candy Floss" instead of "Cotton Candy", "Water Chute" instead of "Water Slide", "Dodgems" instead of "Bumper Cars", "Big Wheel" instead of "Ferris Wheel" and "railways" instead of "railroads". Depending on the version of the board the Rest Rooms may be alternatively called the Café, and Uncle Pennybags may be alternatively called Mr. Monopoly.

== Rules ==
Source: Monopoly Junior (2013) official rules

Players take turns in order, with the initial player determined by age before the game: the youngest player goes first. Players are dealt an initial amount Monopoly money depending on the total number of players playing: 20 in a two-player game, 18 in a three-player game or 16 in a four-player game. A typical turn begins with the rolling of the die and the player advancing their token clockwise around the board the corresponding number of spaces. When the player lands on an unowned space they must purchase the space from the bank for the amount indicated on the board, and places a sold sign on the coloured band at the top of the space to denote ownership. If a player lands on a space owned by an opponent the player pays the opponent rent in the amount written on the board. If the opponent owns both properties of the same colour the rent is doubled.

A player may sell properties for extra money or if they do not have enough money to pay a debt.

A player who lands on or passes the GO space collects 2 Monopoly money from the bank. Players who land on a Chance space must take the top Chance card from the draw pile and follow the instructions. No reward or penalty is given for landing on Free Parking or Just Visiting. Players who land on Go To Jail must move their token to Jail (without passing GO nor collecting 2 Monopoly money). To get out of Jail the player may use a Get Out of Jail Free card or pay 1 Monopoly money to the bank at the start of their next turn.

The game is over when a player is bankrupted by not having enough money to pay rent, buy a property or pay a fee on a Chance card. The remaining player with the most money wins. In the event of a tie the player with the most properties wins.

=== 1990 original rules ===
Source: Monopoly Junior (1990) official rules

The rules of the original Monopoly Junior game are very similar to the modern rules. Players are dealt $31 at the beginning of the game: five $1 notes, four $2, three $3, one $4 and one $5. Players take turns in order, with the initial player determined by chance before the game: players roll the die, and the highest roller goes first. A typical turn begins with the rolling of the die and the player advancing their token clockwise around the board the corresponding number of spaces. When the player lands on a vacant amusement they must purchase the amusement from the bank for the amount indicated on the board, and places a ticket booth token on the colored band at the top of the space to denote ownership. If a player lands on an amusement owned by an opponent the player pays the opponent rent in the amount written on the board. If the opponent owns both amusements of the same color the rent is doubled!

A player who lands on or passes the GO space collects $2 from the bank. Players who land on a Chance space must take the top Chance card from the draw pile and follow the instructions. Chance cards indicating a Free Ticket Booth allow the player to claim a vacant amusement of the color indicated on the card for free, or to remove the ticket booth from an amusement (of the indicated color) owned by another player, unless both amusements of that color are owned by one player; in which case, the player who drew the Chance card must discard it and draw another. No reward or penalty is given for landing on the Rest Rooms, as they are "Just Waiting". Players who land on "Pay $3 Take the Tramway to the Rest Rooms" must pay $3 and place it on Mr. Monopoly's Loose Change and move their token to the Rest Rooms (without passing GO or collecting $2). On their next turn they may roll the die and move their token as usual. Players who land on the Fireworks or Water Show must place $2 on Mr. Monopoly's Loose Change. A player who lands on Mr. Monopoly's Loose Change is rewarded with any money on the space. Players who land on any of the railroads must roll the die again and move their token.

The game is over when a player is bankrupted by not having enough money to pay rent, buy an amusement or pay a fee. All remaining players count their money, and the player with the most money wins.

=== 2006 rules changes ===
Source: Monopoly Junior (2006) official rules

There are no Uncle Pennybag's Loose Change or Restroom spots.

Uncle Pennybag's Loose Change is now called Mr. Monopoly's Loose Change. Restroom spots are replaced with Lunch spots. Players who land on 'Go To Lunch' pay $3 to the bank, then move the pawn directly to Lunch without passing 'GO' or collecting $2.

== Differences between Monopoly and Monopoly Junior ==
| Monopoly | Monopoly Junior |
|---|---|
| Players start with $1,500 ($1×5, $5×1, $10×2, $20×1, $50×1, $100×4 and $500×2 (originally $1×5, $5×5, $10×5, $20×6, $50×2, $100×2 and $500×2)) | Players start with $16–20 ($31 in the original game; $1×5, $2×4, $3×3, $4×2 and $5×1) |
| The board is made up of 40 spaces. | The board is made up of 24 spaces (32 on the original board). |
| Players roll 2 six-sided dice for each turn. Players may roll again when rolling doubles, but must go to Jail if doubles are rolled three times in a row. | Players roll 1 six-sided die for each turn. (Players must roll again when landing on a Railroad space on the original board.) |
| Players collect $200 when passing or landing on GO. | Players collect $2 when passing or landing on GO. |
| Buying properties is optional. If a player declines to buy a property for its asking price the property is auctioned. | Buying properties (or amusements) is compulsory. There is no auction. |
| Properties can be improved with houses and hotels. | Properties (or amusements) cannot be improved. |
| Color groups have two or three properties. | Color groups have two properties (or amusements). |
| Denominations of money are $1 (white), $5 (pink), $10 (yellow), $20 (green), $50 (blue), $100 (beige), and $500 (orange) notes. | The only denomination is 1 Monopoly money (white). (The original game featured denominations of $1 (white), $2 (yellow), $3 (blue), $4 (green) and $5 (pink) notes.) |
| Ownership of properties is marked by Title Deed. | Ownership of properties is marked by a sold sign placed on the board. (In the original game ownership of amusements is marked by a ticket booth.) |
| When the player lands on Go To Jail they must go straight to Jail. | In the original game when the player must take the tramway to the Rest Rooms they must go straight to the Rest Rooms and pay $3. |
| To get out of Jail the player must throw doubles on one of their next three turns, use a Get Out of Jail Free card, or pay a fine of $50 (which must be paid if doubles are not thrown by the third turn). | To get out of Jail the player must use a Get Out of Jail Free card or pay a fine of $1 on their next turn. (In the original game the player is free to leave the Rest Rooms on their next turn.) |
| There are Chance and Community Chest cards. | All cards are Chance cards. |
| The game ends when one player forces all other players to go bankrupt. In Official Short Game rules, the game ends when one player is bankrupted. In Time Limit games (used in tournaments), if the win condition is not reached, the game ends at the time limit. In either short game or time game, the winner is the remaining player with the highest score, based on cash on hand, properties owned (one-half the value if mortgaged), and improvements (houses and hotels). | The game ends when one player is bankrupted. The winner is the remaining player with the most cash on hand. If multiple players are tied in cash, properties owned is the tiebreaker. |
| Extra money can be borrowed by mortgaging properties. | It is not possible to borrow money in any way. |
| Free Parking jackpot is a common house rule, but not official. | In the original game Uncle Pennybag's Loose Change is an official rule. |

== Variations ==
In addition to the standard Monopoly Junior, over thirty variations have been released. Among them:

- Travel Edition (1994)
- Trek Alaska (1998)
- Deep Sea Adventure (2000)
- Dig 'N Dinos (2001)
- Toy Story (2001)
- Disney Princess (2004, 2020)
- Shrek 2 (2004)
- Lemonade (2005)
- Disney Channel (2007, 2010)
- Ben 10 (2008)
- Cars 2 (2011)
- Angry Birds (2012)
- Monsters University (2013)
- Despicable Me 2 (2013) - this variation omits the Railway spaces and uses a spinner similar to the "pod" in the Despicable Me 2 Battle Pods game in place of a die, as well as figures shared between the two games and the Despicable Me 2 edition of Operation.
- Planes (2013)
- Teenage Mutant Ninja Turtles (2014)
- How to Train Your Dragon (2014)
- My Little Pony: Friendship is Magic (2014)
- Frozen (2015)
- Sofia the First (2015)
- Kung Fu Panda 3 (2016)
- Yo-Kai Watch (2016)
- Finding Dory (2016)
- Cars 3 (2017)
- My Little Pony: The Movie (2017)
- Incredibles 2 (2018)
- Miraculous: Tales of Ladybug & Cat Noir (2019)
- Trolls World Tour (2020)
- Peppa Pig (2020) - Two variations exist, one displaying the animal characters as the property spaces and another showing locations in Peppa's world.
- Bluey (2022)
- Super Mario (2022)
- Paw Patrol (2023)
