= List of licensed and localized editions of Monopoly: South America =

The following is a list of game boards of the Parker Brothers/Hasbro board game Monopoly adhering to a particular theme or particular locale in South America. Lists for other regions can be found here. The game is licensed in 103 countries and printed in 37 languages.

== Argentina ==
Argentina Edition - El Estanciero

Libre Estacionamiento	Villa Carlos Paz		Termas de Río Hondo	Valle de la Luna	Ferrocarril Belgrano	Tren de las Nubes	Quebrada de Humahuaca	Aguas Corrientes	Cataratas del Iguazú	Vaya a la cárcel
Cosquín	Argentina Edition - El Estanciero									Gualeguaychú
Aconcagua	Argentina Edition - El Estanciero									Rosario
Puente del Inca	Argentina Edition - El Estanciero									Mar del Plata
Ferrocarril Mitre	Argentina Edition - El Estanciero									Ferrocarril San Martín
Valle de las Leñas	Argentina Edition - El Estanciero
San Martín de los Andes	Argentina Edition - El Estanciero									La Boca
Energía Eléctrica	Argentina Edition - El Estanciero
Cerro Tronador	Argentina Edition - El Estanciero									Obelisco
	Lago Nahuel Huapi	Esquel		Península de Valdes	Ferrocarril Roca		Glaciar Perito Moreno		Ushuaia	Salida

Game description: El Estanciero, with streets changed for estancias located in different provinces of Argentina.

== Brazil ==
Brazil Edition (mix of São Paulo and Rio de Janeiro) Banco Imobiliário

Copyright date: 1989	Released by: Brinquedos Estrela S.A./Parker Bros./Tonka Corp.

Parada Livre	Flamengo	Sorte.Revés	Botafogo	Imposto de Renda	Companhia de Navegação	Av. Brasil	Sorte.Revés	Av. Paulista	Jardim Europa	Vá para a Prisão
Morumbi	Brazil Edition (mix of São Paulo and Rio de Janeiro) Banco Imobiliário									Copacabana
Lucros ou Dividendos	Brazil Edition (mix of São Paulo and Rio de Janeiro) Banco Imobiliário									Companhia de Aviação
Interlagos	Brazil Edition (mix of São Paulo and Rio de Janeiro) Banco Imobiliário									Av.Vieira Souto
Sorte.Revés	Brazil Edition (mix of São Paulo and Rio de Janeiro) Banco Imobiliário									Av. Atlântica
Companhia de Taxi	Brazil Edition (mix of São Paulo and Rio de Janeiro) Banco Imobiliário									Companhia de Taxi Aéreo
Av. Pacaembú	Brazil Edition (mix of São Paulo and Rio de Janeiro) Banco Imobiliário									Ipanema
Rua Augusta	Brazil Edition (mix of São Paulo and Rio de Janeiro) Banco Imobiliário									Sorte.Revés
Sorte.Revés	Brazil Edition (mix of São Paulo and Rio de Janeiro) Banco Imobiliário									Jardim Paulista
Av. Europa	Brazil Edition (mix of São Paulo and Rio de Janeiro) Banco Imobiliário									Brooklin
Prisão	Av. 9 de Julho	Av. Rebouças	Companhia de Viação	Av. Brigadeiro Faria Lima	Companhia Ferroviária	Av.Nossa S. de Copacabana	Av. Presidente Vargas	Sorte.Revés (Luck.Adversity)	Leblon	Ponto de Partida

Game description: Banco Imobiliário (Real Estate Bank) Rio de Janeiro and São Paulo, mix version. It also has a lot of special differences like doing away with the Electric Company and Water Works and replacing them with Railroads, so there are 6 of those, and its rent is $50 times the amount shown on the dice, being very different from the original game.
Other features: Unusual property layout: 3 indigo, 2 orange, 2 red, 4 green and no Luxury Tax.

== Chile ==
Metropoli - Each square is an important street from Santiago.

== Colombia ==
Each color group is a different city, including Bogotá, Medellín, Cali, Cartagena, etc.

== Ecuador ==
Ecuador edition (2008)

Parada Libre	Parque de las Iguanas	Casualidad	Parque Histórico Guayaquil	Malecon 2000	Aeropuerto Guayaquil	Las Penas	Municipio de Guayaquil	Agua Potable (Represa Paute)	Parque Centenario	¡Váyase a la cárcel!
Parque Itchimbía	Ecuador edition (2008)									Cuenca
Iglesia DeGuapulo	Ecuador edition (2008)									Ruinas de Inga Pirca
Arca Comunal	Ecuador edition (2008)									Arca Comunal
Panecillo	Ecuador edition (2008)									El Chimborazo
Aeropuerto Quito	Ecuador edition (2008)									Aeropuerto Manta
Palacio de Carondelet	Ecuador edition (2008)									Casualidad
Parque la Carolina	Ecuador edition (2008)									Islas Galápagos
Empresa Electrica	Ecuador edition (2008)									Impuestos de Lujo
Plaza de la Independencia	Ecuador edition (2008)									Mitad del Mundo
En la cárcel/De visit nada más	Manta	Portoviejo	Casualidad	Santo Domingo	Aeropuerto Cuenca	Impuestos Sobre La Renta	Machala	Arca Comunal	Península De Santa Elena	Salida

Game description: In May 2009, Hasbro Inc. presented the new Monopoly Ecuador. Instead of streets, property names are famous landmarks and touristic sites of the country.

== Paraguay ==
Paraguay Edition - Under the name El Banquero (like its Uruguayan counterpart) this unlicensed version includes the main streets of the capital city of Asunción, and uses the Guaraní as its currency. The dearth of railway lines in the city has been worked round by having Railway Station, Bus Station, River Harbour and Airport instead of the various railway terminals we find in most versions.

== Peru ==
Lima Edition

== Uruguay ==
Uruguay Edition - An unlicensed version under the name El Banquero (The Banker).

== Venezuela ==
Venezuela edition (1980)

Parque gratuito	Nuevo Circo	Casualidad	El Velódromo	El Teleferico	Ferrocarrile Maracaibo	Avda. Sucre	Avda. Pdte. Medina	Obras de agua potable	Avda. Paez	Váya a la Cárcel!
Avda. Andres Bello	Venezuela edition (1980)									Avda. Bolivar
Avda. Urdaneta	Venezuela edition (1980)									Avda.R.Gallegos
Arca Comunal	Venezuela edition (1980)									Arca Comunal
Avda. Fco. Miranda	Venezuela edition (1980)									Avda. Baralt
Ferrocarrile Caracas	Venezuela edition (1980)									Ferrocarril Pto. Cabello
Plaza Altamira	Venezuela edition (1980)									Casualidad
Plaza Concordia	Venezuela edition (1980)									Avda. Fco. Fajardo
Compañia de Electricidad	Venezuela edition (1980)									Tasa de Lujo
Plaza Candelaria	Venezuela edition (1980)									Avda. Boyaca.
Cárcel/Pasaje Libre	Jardin Botanico	El Calvario	Casualidad	Plaza Bolivar	Ferrocarrile Barquisimeyo	Impuesto pague el 10% de su efectivo o Bs 200	Avda. San Martin	Arca Comunal	Avda.Libertador	Go

Game description: This edition "Hagace Rico con Monopolio de las Calles de Caracas" was released unofficially, and covers streets in Caracas.
