= Monopoly: The Mega Edition =

Larger version of Monopoly board game

- The box art of the US edition of the game
- Publishers: Winning Moves Games USA
- Publication: May 22, 2006; 20 years ago
- Players: 2-8
- Setup time: 5-15 minutes
- Playing time: 1-2 hours (Designed to be faster than the normal version of Monopoly)
- Chance: Medium (dice rolling, card drawing)

Monopoly: The Mega Edition is an edition of the Hasbro board game Monopoly. The game was first published on May 22, 2006 by Winning Moves Games USA in the United States. A UK version was adapted on October 1, 2007.

The game board is larger than that of regular Monopoly (30% bigger). The game now includes $/£1,000 bills, and it includes an option to build skyscrapers and train depots.

== New board spaces ==
The expanded game board includes twelve new spaces in addition to the standard 40, for a total of 52. Eight of those new spaces are new properties (one for each color group) as follows:

- Brown: Arctic Avenue/Elephant and Castle
  - As with other US editions, the Mega Edition has changed the first Color Group from purple to brown with the recent reprints of the game.
- Light Blue: Massachusetts Avenue/Edgware Road
- Magenta: Maryland Avenue/Downing Street
- Orange: New Jersey Avenue/High Holborn
- Red: Michigan Avenue/Aldwych
- Yellow: California Avenue/Shaftesbury Avenue
- Green: South Carolina Avenue/Savile Row
- Dark Blue: Florida Avenue/Knightsbridge

There is also a third Utility, the Gas Company, situated between Chance and Vermont Avenue/Pentonville.

The other three spaces are completely new to the board. Just after Jail/Just Visiting is the Auction space. If a player lands on this space while the bank still owns any properties, that player chooses one of the available properties to be auctioned off between the players (in similar fashion to regular property auctions). If the bank has no properties left to auction, the player that lands there then moves forward to the property on which they would have to pay the highest rent (the closest one, in case of a tie for highest amount).

The second space, Bus Ticket (located between Michigan Avenue/Aldwych and the B. & O. Railroad/Fenchurch Street Station), allows the player landing there to draw a Bus Ticket card, if any remain. If there are no Bus Ticket cards to draw, the space acts as a second Free Parking space and has no further effect.

The last of the three new spaces, Birthday Gift (located between Chance and Florida Avenue/Park Lane), gives the player that lands there a choice between taking $/£100 from the bank or drawing a Bus Ticket card. (If no Bus Ticket cards remain, the player automatically gets the $/£100.)

== Differences in gameplay ==
Setup is the same as that of regular Monopoly, except that there is a new card deck to go along with the Chance and Community Chest cards called Bus Tickets, and players now receive $/£2,500 at the start of the game (adding one $/£1,000 bill) as opposed to the base $/£1,500 in regular Monopoly. (Earlier printings have silver-grey $1,000 bills; more recent printings have bright yellow $1,000s.)

On their turn, players roll all three dice (two regular dice plus the new Speed Die). Players move the total number of spaces as indicated by the three dice, or two dice if Mr. Monopoly or the Bus is rolled on the Speed Die. If doubles are rolled on the regular dice then the player may roll again as usual; if triples are rolled on the three dice then the player may move to any space on the board that they choose, but they do not roll again. They do not go to Jail if they roll doubles twice before rolling triples, and if they pass GO they collect $200 as usual.

If Mr. Monopoly is rolled on the Speed Die, the player first moves the number of spaces indicated on the two regular dice and deals with the space they land on. If the player has not landed in Jail, they then move forward to the next unowned property, which they may then purchase or put up for auction. If there are no unowned properties, the player needs to move forward to the next property on which they would owe rent to another player. (If all other properties are mortgaged, the player does not move after making the initial move.)

A new alternative to rolling is using a Bus Ticket. If a player uses a Bus Ticket which they own, that player may advance to any space on the side of the board they are currently on. If a player rolls the Bus on the Speed Die, they can choose to either take a Bus Ticket (if any remain) or move forward to the next Chance/Community Chest space after the regular move. Bus Tickets are also obtained by landing on the Bus Ticket or Birthday Gift spaces. Some of the Bus Tickets cause all other Bus Tickets drawn but not played to expire, and thus be discarded. (This includes other Bus Tickets owned by the player who drew the expiration Ticket.)

Each color-group now contains an additional property, as does the group of Utilities (with the Gas Company). If a player owns the majority of properties in a color-group (2 of 3 in Purples/Browns or Dark Blues; 3 of 4 in other color groups), they may begin to build houses and hotels there, with rent doubled on any undeveloped properties. If they own all properties in a color-group, they may upgrade their hotels to Skyscrapers, which increase rent considerably (by $/£500 on First and Second Street properties, and by $/£1000 on Third and Fourth Streets) and charge triple rent on any unimproved properties. In the case of the Utilities, owning all 3 allows the owner to charge 20 times the dice roll (white dice only) of the opponent landing there. (Note: The Chance card that sends a player to the nearest utility is not affected; that player still only pays 10 times the new roll even if the owner owns all 3 utilities.)

Players can also build a train depot on any railroads which they own (the player does not need to own all 4 railroads) at a cost of $/£100. This doubles the rent on that railroad, or quadruples it if an opponent is sent there by one of the "Go To Nearest Railroad" Chance cards (twice the doubled railroad rent).

== Board Layout ==
Monopoly: The Mega Edition layout (US & Canada)

Free Parking	Kentucky Avenue $220	Chance ?	Indiana Avenue $220	Illinois Avenue $240	Michigan Avenue $240	Bus Ticket	B&O Railroad $200	Atlantic Avenue $260	Ventnor Avenue $260	Water Works $150	Marvin Gardens $280	California Avenue $280	Go To Jail
New Jersey Avenue $200	MONOPOLY: THE MEGA EDITION												Pacific Avenue $300
New York Avenue $200	MONOPOLY: THE MEGA EDITION												South Carolina Avenue $300
Tennessee Avenue $180	MONOPOLY: THE MEGA EDITION												North Carolina Avenue $300
Community Chest	MONOPOLY: THE MEGA EDITION												Community Chest
St. James Place $180	MONOPOLY: THE MEGA EDITION												Pennsylvania Avenue $320
Pennsylvania Railroad $200	MONOPOLY: THE MEGA EDITION												Short Line $200
Virginia Avenue $160	MONOPOLY: THE MEGA EDITION												Chance ?
States Avenue $140	MONOPOLY: THE MEGA EDITION												Birthday Gift; Take $100 or a Bus Ticket
Electric Company $150	MONOPOLY: THE MEGA EDITION												Florida Avenue $350
St. Charles Place $140	MONOPOLY: THE MEGA EDITION												Park Place $350
Maryland Avenue $140	MONOPOLY: THE MEGA EDITION												Luxury Tax; Pay $100
Auction any unowned property	MONOPOLY: THE MEGA EDITION												Boardwalk $400
Jail / Just Visiting	Connecticut Avenue $120	Vermont Avenue $100	Gas Company $150	Chance ?	Oriental Avenue $100	Massachusetts Avenue $100	Reading Railroad $200	Income Tax Pay $200	Arctic Avenue* $80	Baltic Avenue* $60	Community Chest	Mediterranean Avenue* $60	Go; Collect $200 salary as you pass

- NOTE: In recent printings of the game, the purple properties are now brown, like the UK edition below.
Monopoly: The Mega Edition layout (UK)

Free Parking	Strand £220	Chance ?	Fleet Street £220	Trafalgar Square £240	Aldwych £240	Bus Ticket	Fenchurch Street Station £200	Leicester Square £260	Coventry Street £260	Water Works £150	Piccadilly £280	Shaftesbury Avenue £280	Go To Jail
High Holborn £200	MONOPOLY: THE MEGA EDITION												Regent Street £300
Vine Street £200	MONOPOLY: THE MEGA EDITION												Oxford Street £300
Marlborough Street £180	MONOPOLY: THE MEGA EDITION												Bond Street £300
Community Chest	MONOPOLY: THE MEGA EDITION												Community Chest
Bow Street £180	MONOPOLY: THE MEGA EDITION												Savile Row £320
Marylebone Station £200	MONOPOLY: THE MEGA EDITION												Liverpool Street Station £200
Downing Street £160	MONOPOLY: THE MEGA EDITION												Chance ?
Northumberland Avenue £160	MONOPOLY: THE MEGA EDITION												Birthday Gift receive £100 or take a Bus Ticket
Electric Company £150	MONOPOLY: THE MEGA EDITION												Park Lane £350
Whitehall £140	MONOPOLY: THE MEGA EDITION												Mayfair £350
Pall Mall £140	MONOPOLY: THE MEGA EDITION												Bank Deposit (pay £100)
Auction any unowned property (If none, move to the highest rent)	MONOPOLY: THE MEGA EDITION												Knightsbridge £400
In Jail/Just Visiting	Edgware Road £120	Pentonville £120	Gas Company £150	Chance ?	Euston Road £100	The Angel Islington £100	King's Cross Station £200	Income Tax (Pay £200)	Elephant And Castle £60	The Whitechapel £60	Community Chest	Old Kent Road £60	Go; Collect £200 salary as you pass

Monopoly: The Mega Edition (France)

Parc Gratuit	Avenue Matignon € 220	Chance ?	Boulevard Malsherbes € 220	Avenue Henri-Martin € 240	Boulevard Haussmann € 240	Ticket de Bus	Gare du Nord € 200	Faubourg Saint-Honoré € 260	Place de la Bourse € 260	Compagnie de Distribution des Eaux € 150	Rue Lafayette € 280	Rue de Rivoli € 280	Allez en Prison
Boulevard Saint-Germain € 200	MONOPOLY: MEGA ÉDITION												Avenue de Breteuil € 300
Place Pigalle € 200	MONOPOLY: MEGA ÉDITION												Avenue de Suffren € 300
Boulevard Saint-Michel € 180	MONOPOLY: MEGA ÉDITION												Avenue Foch € 300
Caisse de Communauté	MONOPOLY: MEGA ÉDITION												Caisse de Communauté
Avenue Mozart € 180	MONOPOLY: MEGA ÉDITION												Boulevard des Capucines € 320
Gare de Lyon € 200	MONOPOLY: MEGA ÉDITION												Gare de Lyon € 200
Rue de Paradis € 160	MONOPOLY: MEGA ÉDITION												Chance ?
Avenue de Neuilly € 160	MONOPOLY: MEGA ÉDITION												Cadeau d'Anniversaire; Touchez € 100 ou un Ticket de Bus
Compagnie de Distribution d'Électrivité € 150	MONOPOLY: MEGA ÉDITION												Champs-Élysées € 350
Boulevard de la Villette € 140	MONOPOLY: MEGA ÉDITION												Rue de la Paix € 350
Boulevard Voltaire € 140	MONOPOLY: MEGA ÉDITION												Taxe de luxe (€ 100)
Vente aux Enchères	MONOPOLY: MEGA ÉDITION												Rue de la Paix € 400
En Prison/Simple Visite	Avenue de la République € 120	Rue de Courcelles € 120	Compagnie de Distribution du Gaz € 150	Chance ?	Rue de Vaugirard € 100	Rue de la Convention € 100	Gare Montparnasse € 200	Impôts sur le Revenu (€ 200)	Boulevard de Ménilmontant € 60	Rue Lecourbe €60	Caisse de Communauté	Boulevard de Belleville €60	DÉPART; Recevez € 200 chaque fois que vous passez ici.

NOTE:

- "The Mega Edition" is translated as either "Mega Édition" (Original version, Paris Edition), "Méga Édition" (Black-themed version), or "Édition Mega" (La France Agricole version)
- All versions except for the Black version keep the purple properties as purple rather than changing it to brown.

== See also ==
- Monopoly (game)
- Parker Brothers
- Rich Uncle Pennybags
