= Monopoly (game) =

Property-trading board game

The Fast-Dealing Property Trading Game

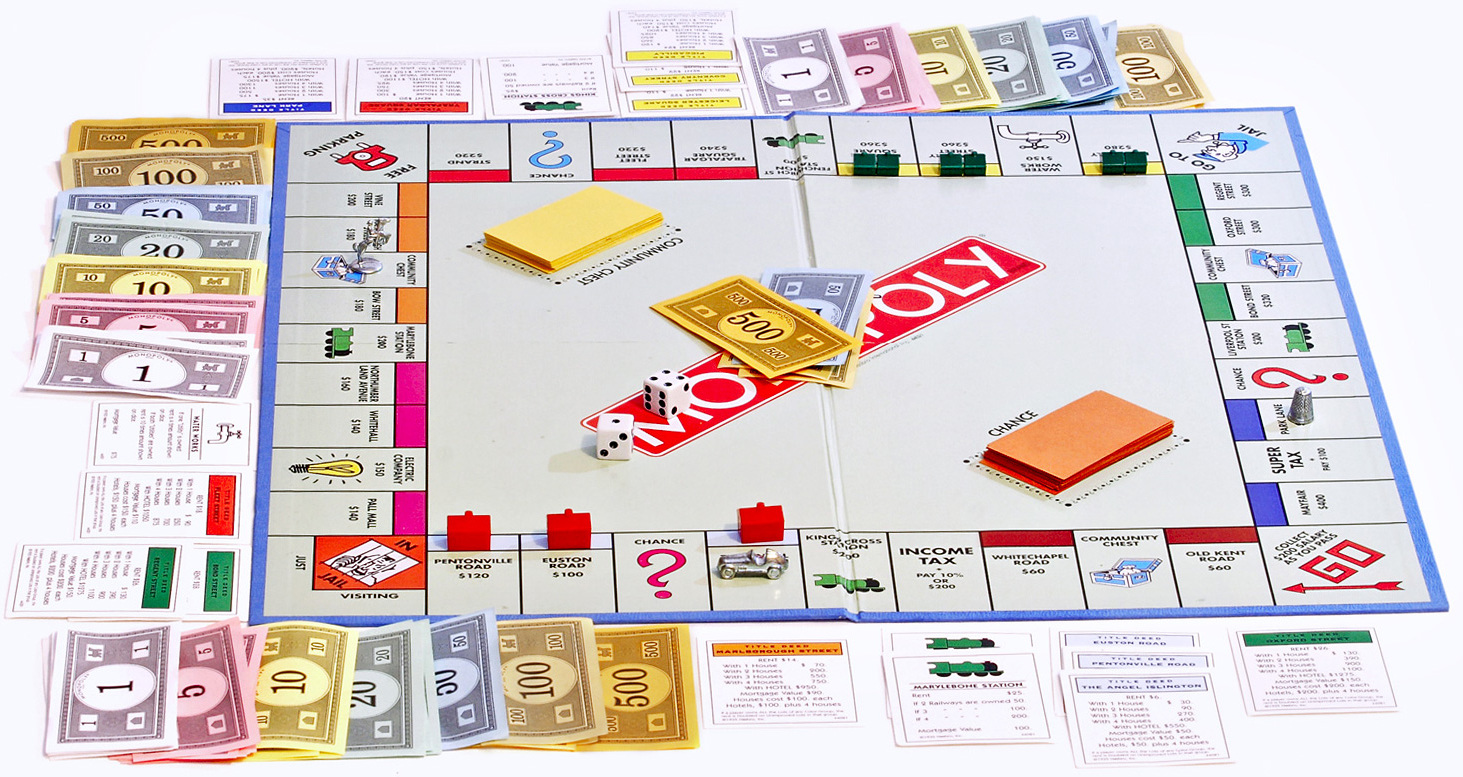
- London version of Monopoly
- Designers: Based on The Landlord's Game by Lizzie Magie with addition of some artwork by Charles Darrow
- Publishers: Hasbro (1992–present); Parker Brothers (1935–1991); Waddingtons (UK, 1936–1994); Winning Moves (licensed, 1997–present); Funskool (India, 1987–present)
- Publication: 1935; 91 years ago
- Genres: Board game
- Players: At least 2 (Note: The maximum number of players is equal to however many tokens are provided in the box. In modern copies, this is usually 8.)
- Setup time: 2–5 minutes
- Playing time: 1–6 hours
- Chance: High (dice rolling, card drawing)
- Age range: 8+
- Skills: Negotiation; Resource management; Financial management; Strategy

Monopoly is a multiplayer economics-themed board game. In the game, players roll two standard dice (or one extra special red die depending on the game) to move their token clockwise around the board, buying and trading properties and railroads and developing them with houses and hotels. Players collect rent from their opponents and aim to drive them into bankruptcy. Money can also be gained or lost through Chance and Community Chest cards and tax squares. Players receive a salary every time they pass "Go" and can end up in jail, from which they cannot move until they have met one of three conditions. House rules, hundreds of different editions, many spin-offs, and related media exist.

Monopoly has become a part of international popular culture, having been licensed locally in more than 113 countries and printed in more than 46 languages. As of 2015, it was estimated that the game had sold 275 million copies worldwide. The properties on the original game board were named after locations in and around Atlantic City, New Jersey.

The game is named after the economic concept of a monopoly—the domination of a market by a single entity. A core strategy is to buy up (or trade for) every property of a certain color, or all the railroads. The game is derived from The Landlord's Game, created in 1903 in the United States by Lizzie Magie, as a way to demonstrate that an economy rewarding individuals is better than one where monopolies hold all the wealth. It also served to promote the economic theories of Henry George—in particular, his ideas about taxation. The Landlord's Game originally had two sets of rules, one with tax and another, on which the current rules are mainly based. Parker Brothers first published Monopoly in 1935. Parker Brothers was eventually absorbed into Hasbro in 1991.

== History ==
=== Early history ===
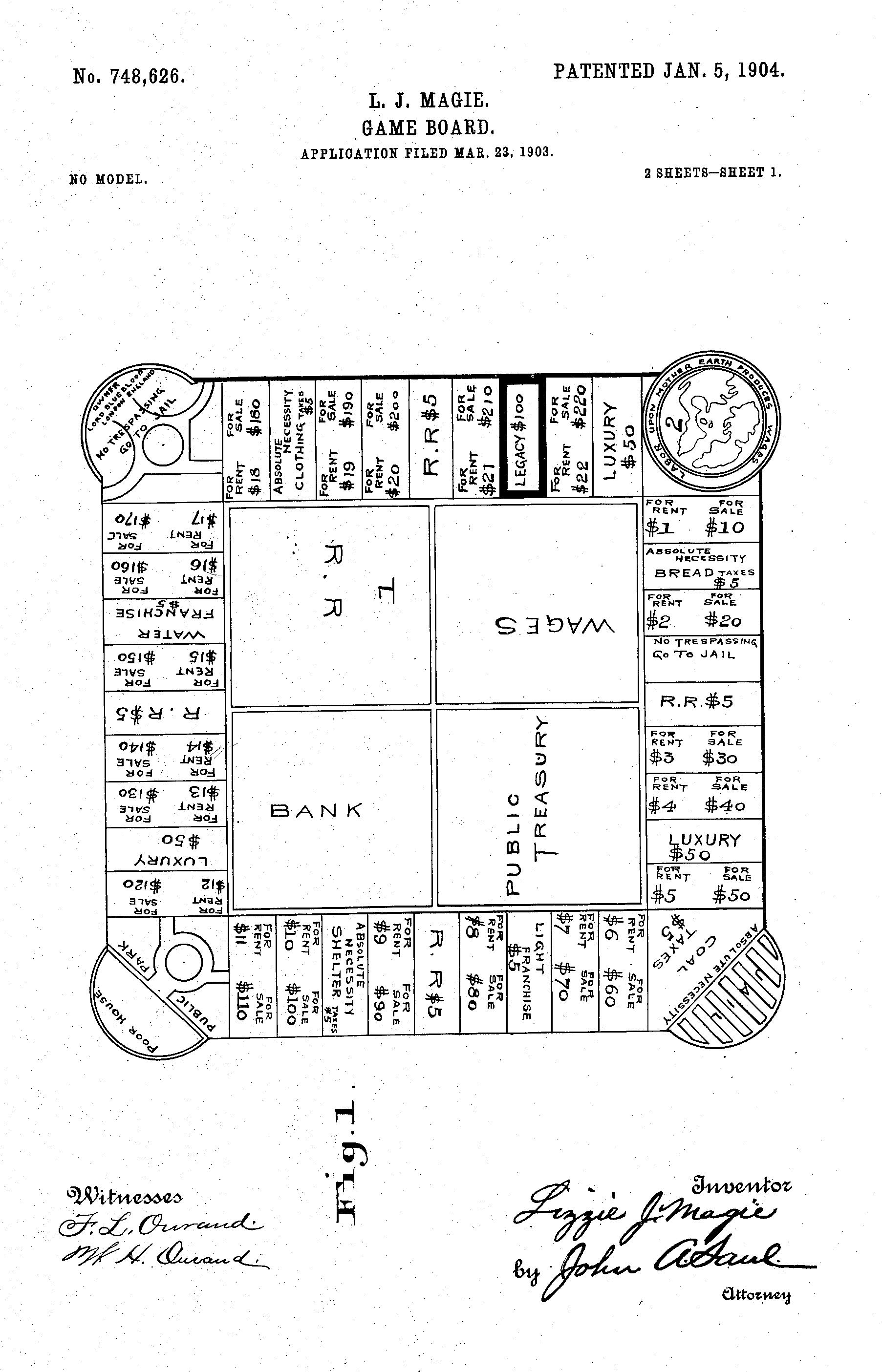
Lizzie Magie's 1904 board design, The Landlord's Game, was a predecessor of Monopoly

The history of Monopoly can be traced back to 1903, when American anti-monopolist Lizzie Magie created a game called Landlord's that she hoped would explain the single-tax theory of Henry George as laid out in his book Progress and Poverty. She devised the key features of the game. It was meant as an educational tool to illustrate the negative aspects of concentrating land in private monopolies. She took out a patent in 1904. This shows the game's characteristic features of a square circuit consisting of corner squares (one the starting point) and a series of intervening spaces where players went round and round until the goal was reached. The railway stations were hazards, demanding a $5 fine. Players received money after completing each circuit. This design was different from other board games of the time. It is possible, but not definitely known, that she was inspired by a game called Zohn Ahl, played by the Kiowa which had a similar shaped board and different rules, and was described in a book about games in 1898. Her game was self-published beginning in 1906.

Magie created two sets of rules: an anti-monopolist set in which all were rewarded when wealth was created, and a monopolist set in which the goal was to create monopolies and crush opponents.

Several variant board games, based on her concept, were developed from 1906 through the 1930s. They involved both the process of buying land for its development, and the sale of any undeveloped property. Cardboard houses were added, and rents increased as they were added to a property. Magie patented the game again in 1923.

According to an advertisement placed in The Christian Science Monitor, Charles Todd of Philadelphia recalled the day in 1932 when his childhood friend Esther Jones and her husband, Charles Darrow, came to his house for dinner. After the meal, the Todds introduced Darrow to The Landlord's Game, which they then played several times. The game was entirely new to Darrow, and he asked the Todds for a written set of the rules. After that night, Darrow went on to utilize it to distribute the game himself as Monopoly. His only change was to add symbols for the electricity and water companies and for the railway stations. Darrow used oil cloth to create a game board, drawn by an artist, which is now in the collection of The Strong National Museum of Play after a $146,500 bid at Sotheby's in 2010.

The Parker Brothers bought the game's copyrights from Darrow. When the company learned Darrow was not the sole inventor of the game, it bought the rights to Magie's patent for $500.

Parker Brothers began marketing the game on November 5, 1935. Cartoonist F. O. Alexander contributed the design. U.S. patent number US 2026082 A was issued to Charles Darrow on December 31, 1935, for the game board design and was assigned to Parker Brothers Inc. The original version of the game in this format was based on the streets of Atlantic City, New Jersey.

=== 1936–1970 ===
Parker Brothers began licensing the game for sale outside the United States in 1936. In 1941, the British Secret Intelligence Service had John Waddington Ltd., the licensed manufacturer of the game in the United Kingdom, create a special edition for World War II prisoners of war held by the Nazis. Hidden inside these games were maps, compasses, real money, and other objects useful for escaping. They were distributed to prisoners by fake charity organizations created by the British Secret Service.

=== 1970s–1980s ===
Economics professor Ralph Anspach published Anti-Monopoly in 1973, and was sued for trademark infringement by Parker Brothers in 1974. The case went to trial in 1976. Anspach won on appeals in 1979, as the 9th Circuit Court determined that the trademark Monopoly was generic and therefore unenforceable. The United States Supreme Court declined to hear the case, allowing the appellate court ruling to stand. This decision was overturned by the passage of Public Law 98-620 in 1984. With that law in place, Parker Brothers and its parent company, Hasbro, continue to hold valid trademarks for the game Monopoly. However, Anti-Monopoly was exempted from the law and Anspach later reached a settlement with Hasbro and marketed his game under license from them.

=== Hasbro ownership ===
Hasbro acquired Parker Bros. and thus Monopoly in 1991. Before the Hasbro acquisition, Parker Bros. acted as a publisher, issuing only two versions at a time, a regular and deluxe. Hasbro moved to create and license many other versions of Monopoly and sought public input in varying the game. A new wave of licensed products began in 1994, when Hasbro granted a license to USAopoly to begin publishing a San Diego Edition of Monopoly, which has since been followed by more than a hundred more licensees including Winning Moves Games (since 1995) and Winning Solutions, Inc. (since 2000) in the United States.

The company held a national tournament on a chartered train going from Chicago to Atlantic City (see § U.S. National Championship) in 2003. Also that year, Hasbro sued the maker of Ghettopoly for violation of trademarks and copyrights and won. In February 2005, the company sued RADGames over their Super Add-On accessory board game that fitted in the center of the board. The judge initially issued an injunction on February 25, 2005, to halt production and sales before ruling in RADGames's favor in April 2005.

The Speed Die was added to all regular Monopoly sets in 2008. After polling their Facebook followers, Hasbro Gaming took the top house rules and added them to a House Rule Edition released in the fall of 2014 and added them as optional rules in 2015. In January 2017, Hasbro invited internet users to vote on a new set of game pieces, with this new regular edition to be issued in March 2017.

On May 1, 2018, the Monopoly Mansion hotel agreement was announced by Hasbro's managing director for southeast Asia, Jenny Chew Yean Nee, with M101 Holdings Sdn Bhd. M101 has the five-star, 225-room hotel, then under construction, located at the M101 Bukit Bintang in Kuala Lumpur and with a 1920s Gatsby feel. M101's Sirocco Group would manage the hotel when it opened in 2019.

Hasbro announced in March 2021 that it planned to update the Community Chest cards with ones that would be more socially aware, inviting fans of the game to vote on the new versions. In April 2022, Hasbro announced another poll. This vote would see the reintroduction of one previously retired token in exchange for an existing token. The result would see the Thimble return and the T-Rex phased out by fall 2022.

Hasbro revealed an overhaul on January 7, 2025, for release that year, changing the box to a square, renovating the Banker's tray, and enlarging the tokens by roughly 20%. Oriental Avenue was renamed to Rhode Island Avenue, another street in Atlantic City.

== Board ==
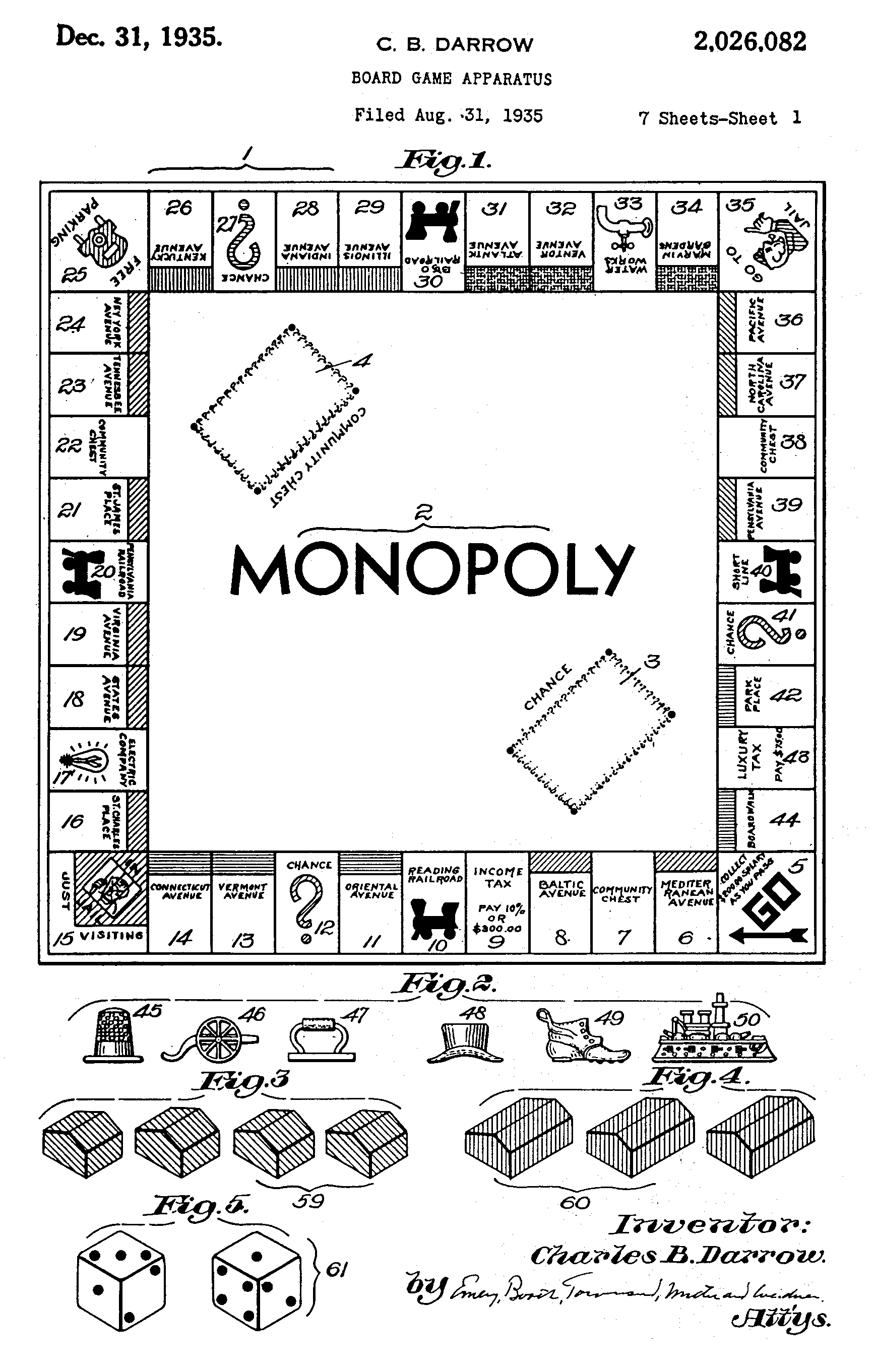
The original 1935 Monopoly board patent

The Monopoly game board consists of forty spaces containing twenty-eight properties—twenty-two streets (grouped into eight distinct color groups), four railroads, and two utilities—three Chance spaces, three Community Chest spaces, a Luxury Tax space, an Income Tax space, and the four corner squares: GO, (In) Jail/Just Visiting, Free Parking, and Go to Jail.

=== US versions ===
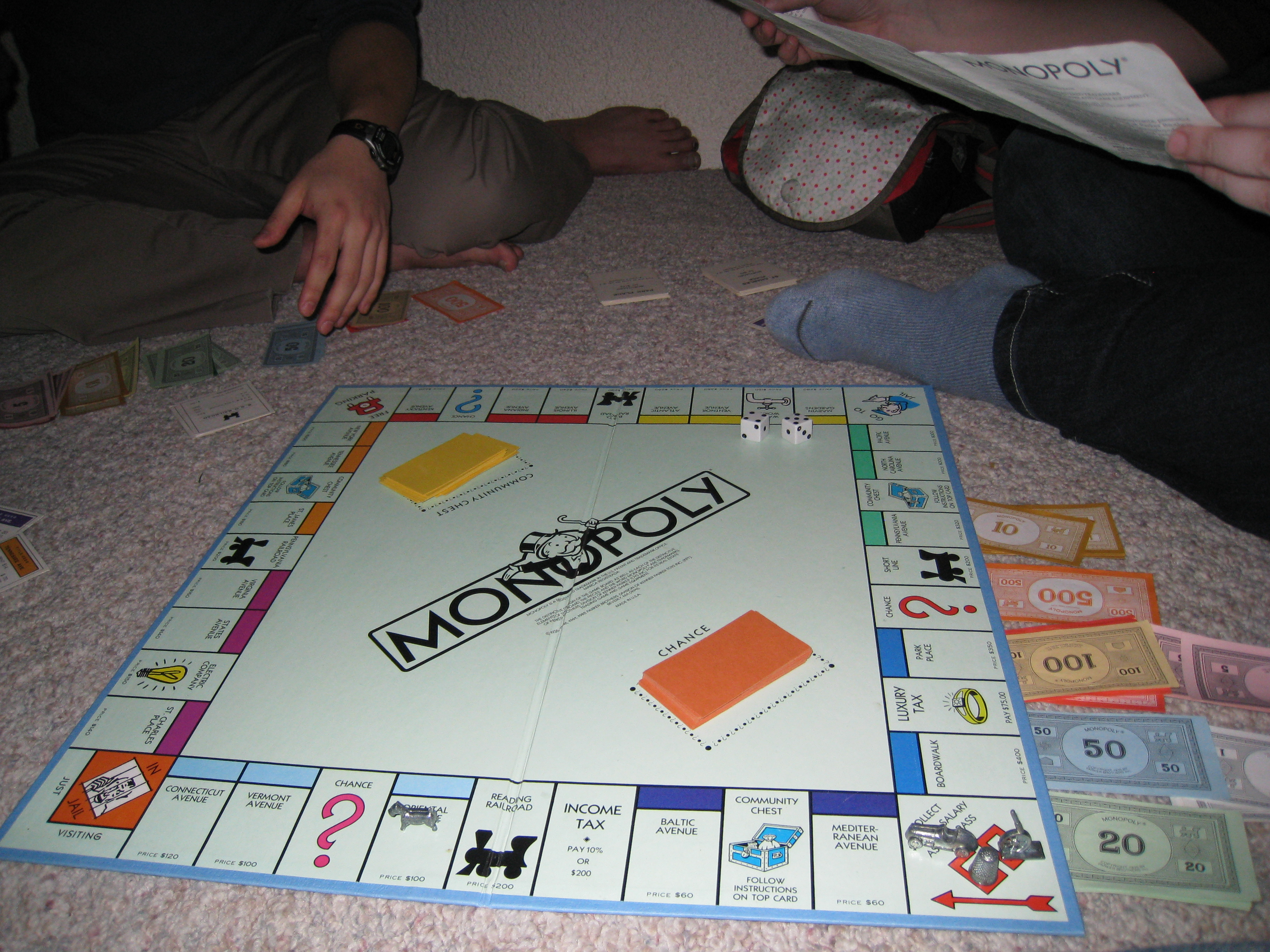
US version of Monopoly

There have since been some changes to the board. Not all of the Chance and Community Chest cards shown in the 1935 patent were used in editions from 1936/1937 onwards. Graphics with the Mr. Monopoly character (then known as "Rich Uncle Pennybags") were added during that same time frame. A graphic of a chest containing coins was added to the Community Chest spaces, as were the flat purchase prices of the properties. Traditionally, the Community Chest cards were yellow (although they were sometimes printed on blue stock), with no decoration or text on the back; Chance cards were orange, also with no text or decoration on the back.

Hasbro commissioned a major graphic redesign to the U.S. standard edition of the game in 2008, along with some minor revisions. Among the changes: the colors of Mediterranean and Baltic avenues were changed from purple to brown, and the color of the "Go" square was changed from red to black. The Luxury Tax amount was increased from $75 to $100, and a flat $200 income tax was imposed (formerly the player's choice of $200 or 10% of their total holdings, which they could not calculate until after making their final decision). The amount was originally $300, but was changed a year after the game's debut.

There were also changes to the Chance and Community Chest cards. For example, the "poor tax", "receive for services", "Xmas fund matures", and "grand opera opening" cards became "speeding fine", "receive $25 consultancy fee", "holiday fund matures", and "it is your birthday", respectively. Though their effects remained the same, the player must pay only $50 instead of $150 for the school tax. In addition, the player now gets $50 instead of $45 for sale of stock, and the "Advance to Illinois Avenue" card now includes added text indicating that the player collects $200 if they pass "Go" on the way there.

2014 US Monopoly box

All the Chance and Community Chest cards were altered in 2008 as part of the game's redesign. Mr. Monopoly's original line illustration was typically replaced by renderings of a 3D Mr. Monopoly model. The backs of the cards now feature their respective symbols, with Community Chest cards in blue and Chance cards in orange.

Additionally, recent versions of Monopoly replace the dollar sign ($) with an "M" symbol including two horizontal strokes through it.

In the US versions shown below, the properties are named after locations in (or near) Atlantic City, New Jersey. Atlantic City's Illinois Avenue was renamed Martin Luther King Jr. Boulevard in the 1980s. St. Charles Place no longer exists, as the Showboat Atlantic City was developed where it once ran. The values on the board reflect real estate property values of 1930s Atlantic City. The two cheapest properties, Baltic Avenue and Mediterranean Avenue, were situated in a low-income, African American neighborhood; higher-value properties, such as Pennsylvania Avenue, Park Place, and Ventnor Avenue, were situated in wealthier neighborhoods.

Various Monopoly-inspired board games have since been created, typically following a similar naming convention suffixed with "-opoly".

Standard (American Edition) Monopoly board layout as of July 2025

Free Parking	Kentucky Avenue ₩220	Chance ?	Indiana Avenue ₩220	Illinois Avenue ₩240	B&O Railroad ₩200	Atlantic Avenue ₩260	Ventnor Avenue ₩260	Water Works ₩150	Marvin Gardens ₩280	Go To Jail
New York Avenue ₩200	MONOPOLY									Pacific Avenue ₩300
Tennessee Avenue ₩180	MONOPOLY									North Carolina Avenue ₩300
Community Chest	MONOPOLY									Community Chest
St. James Place ₩180	MONOPOLY									Pennsylvania Avenue ₩320
Pennsylvania Railroad ₩200	MONOPOLY									Short Line ₩200
Virginia Avenue ₩160	MONOPOLY									Chance ?
States Avenue ₩140	MONOPOLY									Park Place ₩350
Electric Company ₩150	MONOPOLY									Luxury tax (pay ₩100)
St. Charles Place ₩140	MONOPOLY									Boardwalk ₩400
In Jail/Just Visiting	Connecticut Avenue ₩120	Vermont Avenue ₩100	Chance ?	Rhode Island Avenue ₩100	Reading Railroad ₩200	Income tax (pay ₩200)	Baltic Avenue ₩60	Community Chest	Mediter- ranean Avenue ₩60	Collect ₩200 salary as you pass GO

Marvin Gardens, the furthest yellow property, is a misspelling of its actual name, Marven Gardens. The misspelling was introduced by Charles and Olive Todd, who taught the game to Charles Darrow. It was passed on when their homemade Monopoly board was copied by Darrow and then by Parker Brothers. The Todds also changed the Atlantic City Quakers' Arctic Avenue to Mediterranean, and shortened the Shore Fast Line to the Short Line. It was not until 1995 that Parker Brothers acknowledged the misspelling of Marvin Gardens, apologizing to the residents of Marven Gardens.

Short Line refers to the Shore Fast Line, a streetcar line that served Atlantic City. The B&O Railroad did not serve Atlantic City. A booklet included with the reprinted 1935 edition states that the four railroads that served Atlantic City in the mid-1930s were the Jersey Central, the Seashore Lines, the Reading Railroad (now part of Norfolk Southern & CSX), and the Pennsylvania Railroad.

The Baltimore & Ohio (now part of CSX) was the parent of the Reading. There is a tunnel in Philadelphia where track to the south was B. & O. and track to the north was Reading. The Central of N.J. did not have a track to Atlantic City, but was the daughter of the Reading (and granddaughter of the B. & O.) Their track ran from the New York City area to Delaware Bay and some trains ran on the Reading-controlled track to Atlantic City.

The actual "Electric Company" and "Water Works" serving the city are respectively Atlantic City Electric Company (a subsidiary of Exelon) and the Atlantic City Municipal Utilities Authority.

=== UK version ===
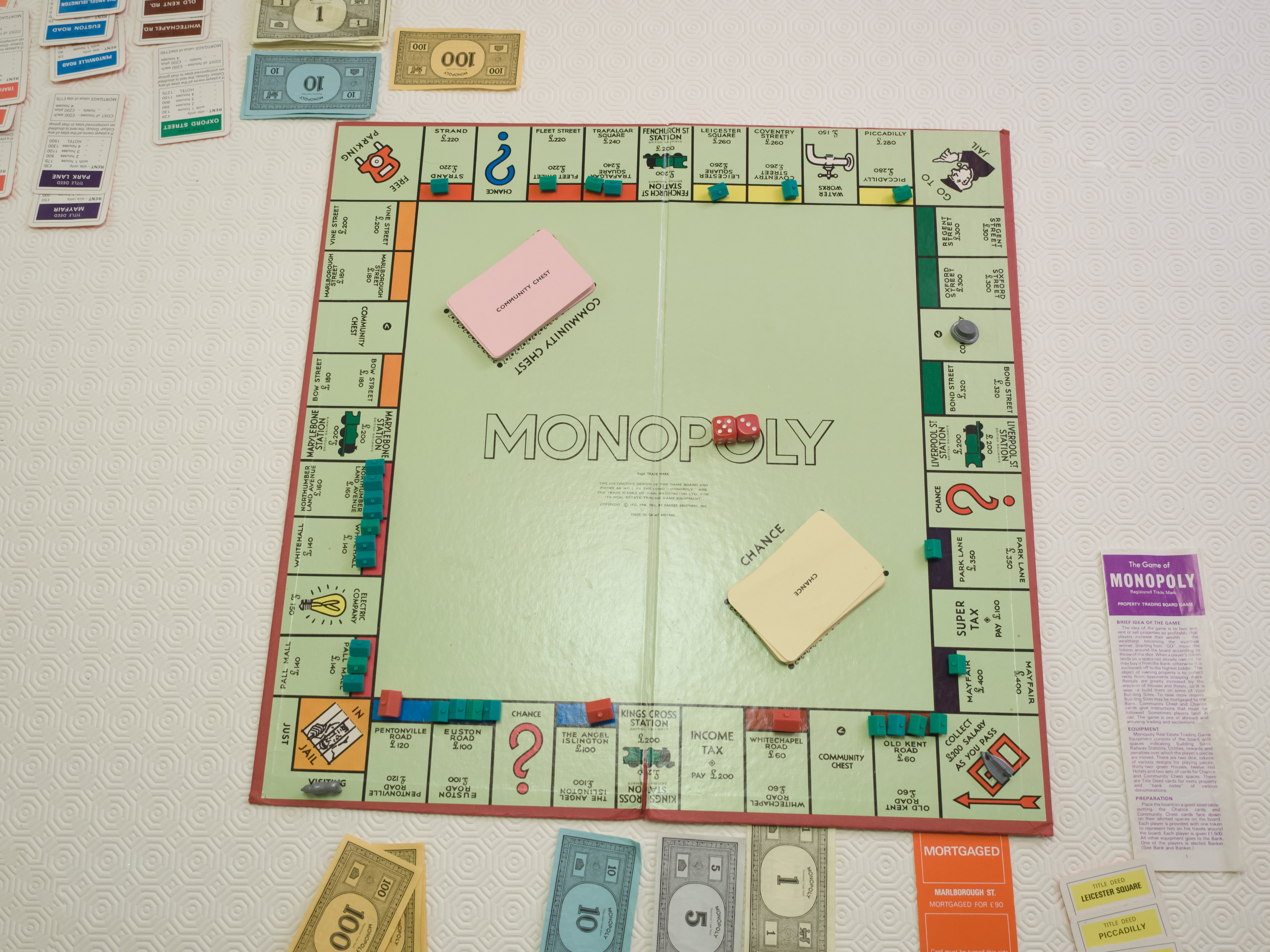
UK version of Monopoly

In the 1930s, John Waddington Ltd., known as Waddingtons, was a printing company in Leeds that had branched out into packaging and the production of playing cards. Waddingtons had sent the card game Lexicon to Parker Brothers hoping to interest it in publishing the game in the United States. In a similar fashion, Parker Brothers sent over a copy of Monopoly to Waddingtons early in 1935 before the game had been put into production in the United States.

Victor Watson, the managing director of Waddingtons, gave the game to his son Norman, head of the card games division, to test over a weekend. Norman was impressed by the game and persuaded his father to call Parker Brothers on Monday morning—transatlantic calls then being almost unheard of. This call resulted in Waddingtons obtaining a license to produce and market the game outside the United States.

Watson felt that for the game to be a success in the United Kingdom, the American locations would have to be replaced, so Victor and his secretary Marjory Phillips went to London to scout out locations. The Angel, Islington is not a street in London, but a building (which also gave its name to the road intersection where it is located, as well as an area of the city and a Tube station). It had been a coaching inn that stood on the Great North Road. By the 1930s, the inn had become a J. Lyons and Co. tea room and is today offices and a Co-operative Bank. Some accounts say that Marjory and Victor met at the Angel to discuss the selection and celebrated the fact by including it on the Monopoly board. In 2003, a plaque commemorating the naming was unveiled at the site by Victor Watson's grandson, who is also named Victor.

It might be expected that the railway stations in Monopoly would have been chosen to allow travel in the four compass directions—for example: Euston, St Pancras or King's Cross (north); Liverpool Street or Fenchurch Street (east); London Bridge or Victoria (south); Paddington (west). However, all four stations had been owned by the same company, LNER, prior to nationalisation as British Rail(ways). It has been suggested that Waddingtons chose LNER stations because this was the company that served Leeds where they were based.

During World War II, the British Secret Service contacted Waddingtons, as the company could also print on silk, to make Monopoly sets that included escape maps, money, a compass and file, all hidden in copies of the game sent by fake POW relief charities to prisoners of war.

The standard British board, produced by Waddingtons, was for many years the version most familiar to people in countries in the Commonwealth, except Canada, where the US edition with Atlantic City-area names was reprinted. Local variants of the board are now also found in several Commonwealth countries.

In 1998, Winning Moves procured the Monopoly license from Hasbro and created new UK city and regional editions with sponsored squares. In December 1998, the game was initially sold in just a few W H Smith stores, but demand was high, with almost 50,000 games sold in the four weeks before Christmas. Winning Moves still produces new city and regional editions annually.

The original income tax choice from the 1930s US board is replaced by a flat rate on the UK board, and the $75 Luxury Tax space is replaced with a £100 Super Tax space. In 2008, the US edition was changed to match the various European editions, including the same flat $200 Income Tax rate and increased $100 Luxury Tax amount.

UK edition Monopoly board layout

Free Parking	Strand £220	Chance ?	Fleet Street £220	Trafalgar Square £240	Fenchurch Street station £200	Leicester Square £260	Coventry Street £260	Water Works £150	Piccadilly £280	Go To Jail
Vine Street £200	MONOPOLY									Regent Street £300
Marlborough Street £180	MONOPOLY									Oxford Street £300
Community Chest	MONOPOLY									Community Chest
Bow Street £180	MONOPOLY									Bond Street £320
Marylebone station £200	MONOPOLY									Liverpool Street station £200
Northumberland Avenue £160	MONOPOLY									Chance ?
Whitehall £140	MONOPOLY									Park Lane £350
Electric Company £150	MONOPOLY									Super Tax (pay £100)
Pall Mall £140	MONOPOLY									Mayfair £400
In Jail/Just Visiting	Pentonville Road £120	Euston Road £100	Chance ?	The Angel, Islington £100	King's Cross station £200	Income Tax (pay £200)	Whitechapel Road £60	Community Chest	Old Kent Road £60	Collect £200 salary as you pass GO

=== Post-2005 variations ===
==== Here and Now ====
Beginning in the UK in 2005, a revised version of the game, titled Monopoly Here and Now, was produced, replacing game scenarios, properties, and tokens with more modern equivalents. Similar boards were produced for Germany and France. Variants of these first editions appeared with Visa-branded debit cards taking the place of cash—the later US "Electronic Banking" edition has unbranded debit cards.

The success of the first Here and Now editions prompted Hasbro US to allow online voting for twenty-six landmark properties across the United States to take their places along the game-board. The popularity of this voting, in turn, led to the creation of similar websites, and secondary game-boards per popular vote to be created in the UK, Canada, France, Germany, Australia, New Zealand, Ireland, and other nations.

The US edition of Monopoly Here and Now was released in September 2006. This edition features top landmarks across the US. The properties were decided by votes over the Internet in the spring of 2006.

Monetary values are multiplied by 10,000 (e.g., one collects $2,000,000 instead of $200 for passing GO and pays that much for Income Tax (or 10% of their total, as this edition was launched prior to 2008), each player starts with $15,000,000 instead of $1,500, etc.). Also, the Chance and Community Chest cards are updated, the Railroads are replaced by Airports (Chicago O'Hare, Los Angeles International, New York City's JFK, and Atlanta's Hartsfield–Jackson), and the Utilities (Electric Company and Water Works) are replaced by Service Providers (Internet Service Provider and Cell Phone Service Provider). The houses and hotels are blue and silver, not green and red as in most editions of Monopoly. The board uses the traditional US layout; the cheapest properties are purple, not brown, and "Interest on Credit Card Debt" replaces "Luxury Tax".

Despite the updated Luxury Tax space, and the Income Tax space no longer using the 10% option, this edition uses paper Monopoly money, and not an electronic banking unit like the Here and Now World Edition. However, a similar edition of Monopoly, the Electronic Banking edition, does feature an electronic banking unit and bank cards, as well as a different set of tokens. Both Here and Now and Electronic Banking feature an updated set of tokens from the Atlantic City edition.

One landmark, Texas Stadium, has been demolished and was replaced by the Irving Interchange exit ramps the join Texas State Highway 183 (Airport Freeway) to Texas State Highway Loop 12. Another landmark, Jacobs Field, still exists, but was renamed Progressive Field in 2008.

Monopoly Here and Now: The U.S. Edition (2006)

Free Parking	Camelback Mountains, Phoenix $2.2M	Chance ?	Waikiki Beach, Honolulu $2.2M	Walt Disney World, Orlando $2.4M	JFK Airport, New York City $2M	French Quarter, New Orleans $2.6M	Hollywood, Los Angeles $2.6M	Internet Service $1.5M	Golden Gate Bridge, San Francisco $2.8M	Go To Jail
Pioneer Square, Seattle $2M	Monopoly; Here and Now: The U.S. Edition									Las Vegas Blvd, Las Vegas $3M
Johnson Space Center, Houston $1.8M	Monopoly; Here and Now: The U.S. Edition									Wrigley Field, Chicago $3M
Community Chest	Monopoly; Here and Now: The U.S. Edition									Community Chest
South Beach, Miami $1.8M	Monopoly; Here and Now: The U.S. Edition									White House, Washington $3.2M
Los Angeles International Airport $2M	Monopoly; Here and Now: The U.S. Edition									Hartsfield–Jackson Atlanta International Airport $2M
Liberty Bell, Philadelphia $1.6M	Monopoly; Here and Now: The U.S. Edition									Chance ?
Red Rocks Amphitheatre, Denver $1.4M	Monopoly; Here and Now: The U.S. Edition									Fenway Park, Boston $3.5M
Cell Phone Service $1.5M	Monopoly; Here and Now: The U.S. Edition									Interest On Credit Card Debt pay $750K
Centennial Olympic Park, Atlanta $1.4M	Monopoly; Here and Now: The U.S. Edition									Times Square, New York City $4M
In Jail/Just Visiting	Mall of America, Minneapolis $1.2M	Gateway Arch, St. Louis $1M	Chance ?	Grand Ole Opry, Nashville $1M	O'Hare Airport, Chicago $2M	Income tax pay $2M or 10%	Texas Stadium, Dallas $600K	Community Chest	Jacobs Field, Cleveland $600K	Collect $2M salary as you pass GO

In 2015, in honor of the game's 80th birthday, Hasbro held an online vote to decide which cities would make it to an updated version of Here and Now. This second edition is more a spin-off as the winning condition has changed to completing a passport instead of bankrupting opponents. Community Chest is replaced with Here and Now cards, while the Here and Now space replaced the railroads. Houses and hotels have been removed.

Hasbro released a World edition with the top voted cities from all around the world, as well as at least a Here and Now edition with the voted-on U.S. cities.

==== The Mega Edition ====
Winning Moves Games released The Mega Edition, with a 30% larger game-board and revised game play, in 2006. Other streets from Atlantic City (eight, one per color group) were included, along with a third utility, the Gas Company. In addition, $1,000 denomination notes (first seen in Winning Moves' Monopoly: The Card Game) are included. Game play is further changed with bus tickets (allowing non-dice-roll movement along one side of the board), a speed die (itself adopted into variants of the standard edition; see below), skyscrapers (a tier of building after hotels), and train stations that can be placed on the Railroad spaces.

This edition was adapted for the UK market in 2007, and is sold by Winning Moves UK.

==== Empire ====
Monopoly Empire has uniquely branded tokens and places based on popular brands. Instead of buying properties, players buy popular brands one by one and slide their billboards onto their Empire towers. Instead of building houses and hotels, players collect rent from their rivals based on their tower height. The first player to fill their tower with billboards wins. Every space on the board is a brand name, such as Xbox, Coca-Cola, McDonald's and Samsung.

==== Token Madness ====
This version of Monopoly contains 8 of the 56 tokens from the 2017 Token Madness event. That includes a penguin, a television, a race car, a Mr. Monopoly emoji, a rubber duck, a watch, a wheel and a bunny slipper.

The Penguin and Rubber Duck, alongside the T-Rex, (which was not present in Token Madness) would eventually become part of the main game, replacing the Boot, Wheelbarrow and Thimble. The T-Rex would be replaced by the returning Thimble in the 2022 Throwback Token Vote.

==== Jackpot ====
During the game, players travel around the gameboard buying properties and collecting rent. If they land on a Chance space, or roll the Chance icon on a die, they can spin the Chance spinner to try to make more money. Players may hit the "Jackpot", go bankrupt, or be sent to Jail. The player who has the most cash when the bank crashes wins.

==== Ultimate Banking Edition ====
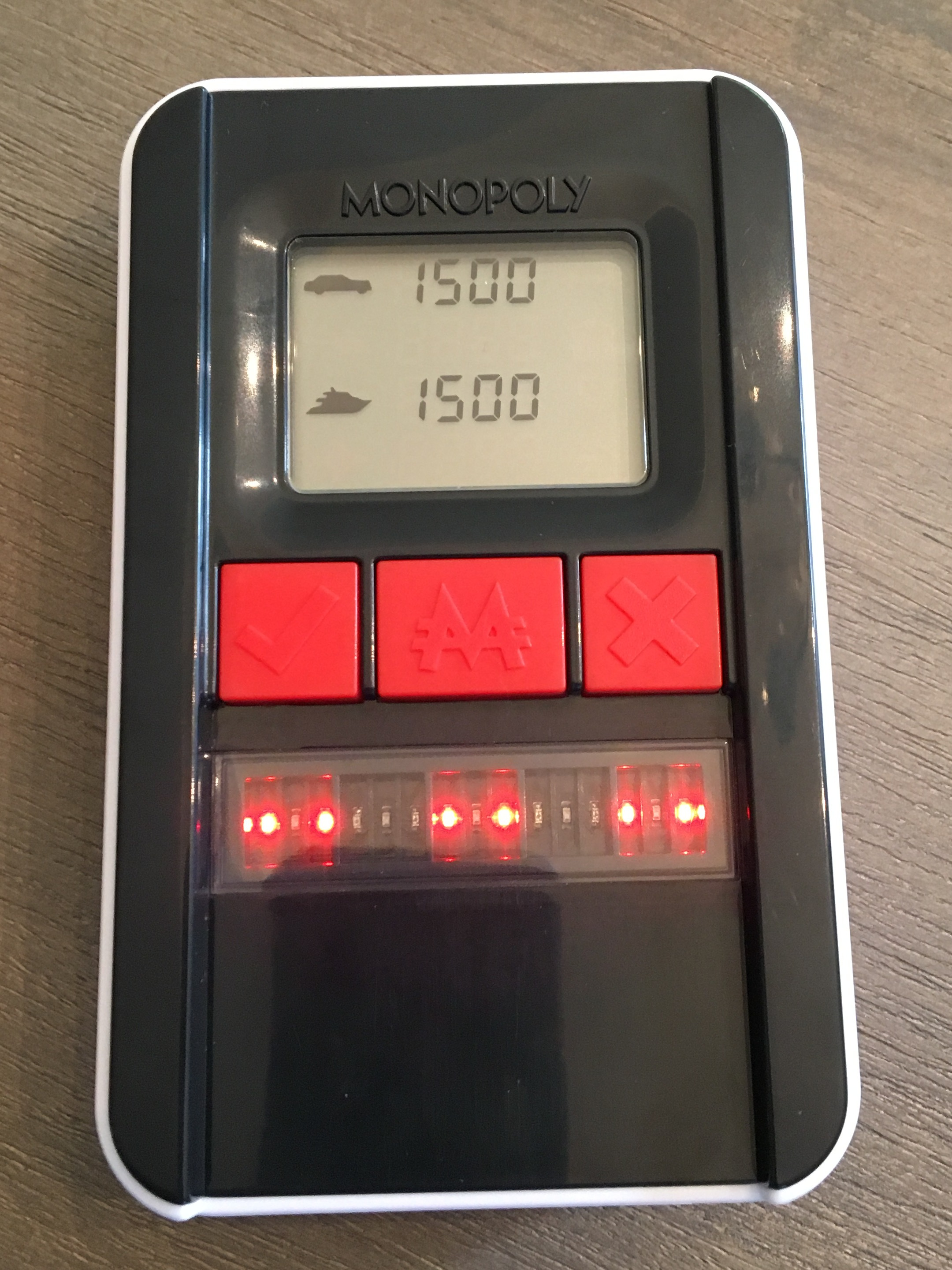
The 'Ultimate Banking Unit' utilized in the Ultimate Banking Edition

In this version, there is no cash. The Monopoly Ultimate Banking game features an electronic ultimate banking piece with touch technology. Players can buy properties instantly and set rents by tapping. Each player has a bankcard and their cash is tracked by the Ultimate Banking unit. It can scan the game's property cards and boost or crash the market. Event cards and Location spaces replace Chance and Community Chest cards. On an Event Space, rents may be raised or lowered, a player may earn or lose money, or someone could be sent to Jail. Location Spaces allow players to pay and move to any property space on the gameboard.

==== Voice Banking ====
In this version, there are no cash or cards. Voice Banking allows the player to respond by voice to the Top Hat. The hat responds by purchasing properties, paying rent, and making buildings.

==== Ms. Monopoly ====
In this version, the spaces players land on are replaced by inventions that women created or contributed to, and female players are given advantages.

== Equipment ==
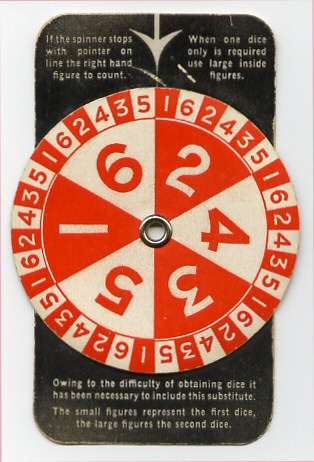
During World War II, the dice in the United Kingdom were replaced with a spinner because of a lack of materials.

Besides the game board, a standard Monopoly set includes items such as property title deeds, houses, hotels, Chance and Community Chest cards, Monopoly money, and tokens. When setting up for a game of Monopoly, all extra cash, property title deeds, and buildings are left in the box. This is called the "bank", and it may be controlled by an active player, or by a separate entity who is not actively playing.

=== Chance and Community Chest Cards ===
A Monopoly set contains 32 Chance and Community Chest cards (16 each), which are placed on the board during play. Chance and Community Chest cards have various instructions printed on them, and they are drawn when a player lands on their corresponding space.

Once the instructions on the drawn card have been followed, it is placed at the bottom of the deck. Some cards may be kept by the player to be used at a later time during the game.

=== Deeds ===
Property title deed cards represent the various purchasable properties on the game board. When a player takes ownership of a property space, they receive its corresponding title deed card.

Printed on the card's obverse are extra details about the property, such as the amount of rent to charge opponents who land on that space, and the costs of developing the property with houses and hotels. On the card's reverse side is its mortgage value. In more recent editions, the reverse side also has the amount a player must pay to unmortgage a property.

When a player lands on a property space, they may buy it from the bank at the price listed on the game board. Property prices range from $60 to $400. If they do not wish to buy it, the bank must offer it up for auction to other players, with the winner of the auction acquiring the property. If no players wish to bid on the property, it remains in the bank for purchase at a later time.

Most editions of the game feature the following property types:

- Twenty-two locations, divided into eight color groups with two or three locations each. Players must own all properties within a color group, before building houses or hotels on them. Houses or hotels must be built up or broken down evenly on all properties within a color group. If a player owns all properties in a color group, the chargeable rent on any unimproved property within that group is doubled.
- Four railroads/railroad stations, located in the center of each side of the game board. A railroad or station entitles its owner to collect $25 rent from opponents who land on it, and the amount is doubled for each subsequent railroad the player purchases, up to $200.
- Two utilities, located on the left and top sides of the game board. A utility entitles its owner to collect rent equal to four times the amount rolled on the dice from opponents, and ten times the amount rolled if both utilities are owned. Some international editions have fixed rates for rent on utilities instead. (Note: For example, Italian editions of the game charge L. 2,000 rent if one utility is owned, and L. 10,000 if both utilities are owned by a player.)

=== Dice ===
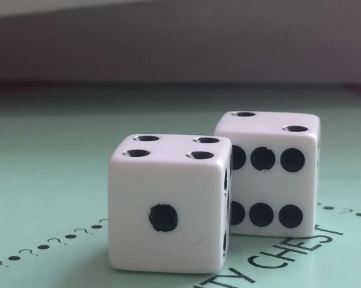
Two standard dice, included in the original Monopoly board game

A pair of six-sided dice is included, with a "speed die" added for variation in 2007. The 1999 Millennium Edition featured two jewel-like dice which were the subject of a lawsuit from Michael Bowling, owner of dice maker Crystal Caste. Hasbro lost the suit in 2008 and had to pay $446,182 in royalties. Subsequent printings of the game reverted to normal six-sided dice.

=== Houses and hotels ===
A standard Monopoly set contains 32 houses and 12 hotels, made from plastic (in most base sets) or wood (in the original and Deluxe Edition of the game).

Players must own all properties within a color set, before building houses and hotels on them. Players can build as many houses as they want in a single instance, and may even build on other players' turns. However, players must build evenly on owned properties - that is, they must have the same number of houses on all properties in a single color group they own, before building any new ones. Once a player has built four houses on a property, they may build a hotel to replace the houses.

Houses and hotels increase the rent a player is entitled to collect from opponents who land on that property. Unlike money, the game has a finite supply of houses and hotels. If multiple players wish to buy the last available house, the bank must auction it off to the highest bidder. If there are no houses left, players may not build any and must wait for other players with houses to return them to the bank. Some editions or rulesets allow players to build straight up to hotels, if there are no houses available.

=== Money ===
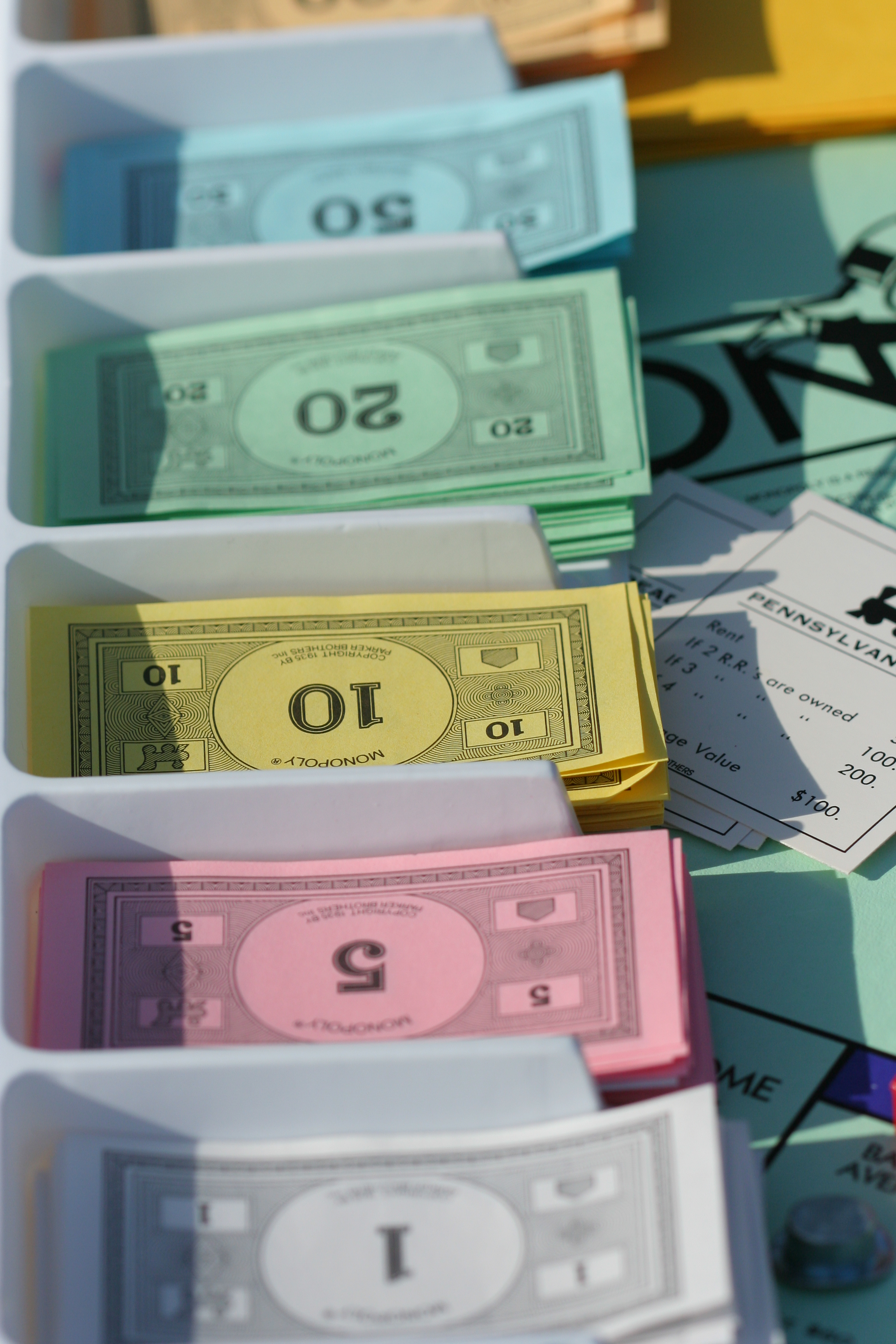
Currency stacked in the game's "bank"

Monopoly money (symbol: ₩) is a type of play money used in Monopoly. It is different from most currencies, including the American currency or British currency upon which it is based, in that it is smaller, one-sided, and does not have different imagery for each denomination.

Older US standard editions of the game included a total of $15,140 in the following denominations:

- 20 $500 bills (orange)
- 20 $100 bills (beige)
- 30 $50 bills (blue)
- 50 $20 bills (green)
- 40 $10 bills (yellow)
- 40 $5 bills (pink)
- 40 $1 bills (white)

Newer (September 2008 and later) US editions provide a total of $20,580—30 of each denomination instead. The colors of some of the bills are also changed: $10s are now blue instead of yellow, $20s are a brighter green than before, and $50s are now purple instead of blue.

Each player begins the game with their token on the Go square, and $1,500 (or 1,500 of a localized currency) in play money ($2,500 with the Speed Die). Before September 2008, the money was divided with greater numbers of 20 and 10-dollar bills. Since then, the US version has taken on the British version's initial cash distributions.

US editions (1935–2008)	US editions (2008–2025) / British editions	US editions (2025–)
2 × $500	2 × $/£500	2 × ₩500
2 × $100	4 × $/£100	2 × ₩100
2 × $50	1 × $/£50	3 × ₩50
6 × $20	1 × $/£20	4 × ₩20
5 × $10	2 × $/£10	4 × ₩10
5 × $5	1 × $/£5	5 × ₩5
5 × $1	5 × $/£1	5 × ₩1

Although the US version is indicated as allowing eight players, the cash distribution shown above is not possible with all eight players since it requires 32 $100 bills and 40 $1 bills. However, the amount of cash contained in the game is enough for eight players with a slight alteration of bill distribution.

Since 2008, Monopoly games have used a Monopoly-specific currency symbol "₩" of a double struck-through capital letter M, similar to the won sign (₩) flipped upside-down.

The modern Monopoly game has its Monopoly money denominated in ₩1, ₩5, ₩10, ₩20, ₩50, ₩100, ₩500, and (in some editions) ₩1,000, with all but the last two paralleling the denominations in circulation in the United States. (The US$500 bill and US$1,000 bill were withdrawn in 1969). Monopoly does not include a two-dollar bill. However, Monopoly Junior did include the two in addition to three and four denominations (which do not exist in U.S. currency) for many years. Monopoly Junior later simplified its system to include only one-dollar bills.

Fans have designed unofficial ₩1,000 Monopoly bills for longer games and made them available online. Special editions and spinoffs (e.g., Monopoly Deal) may use larger denominations.

==== International currencies ====
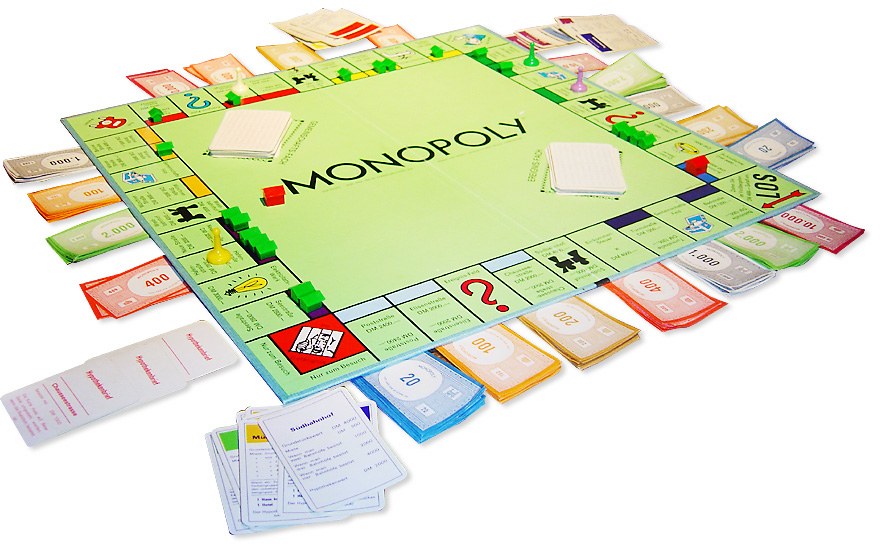
German version of Monopoly

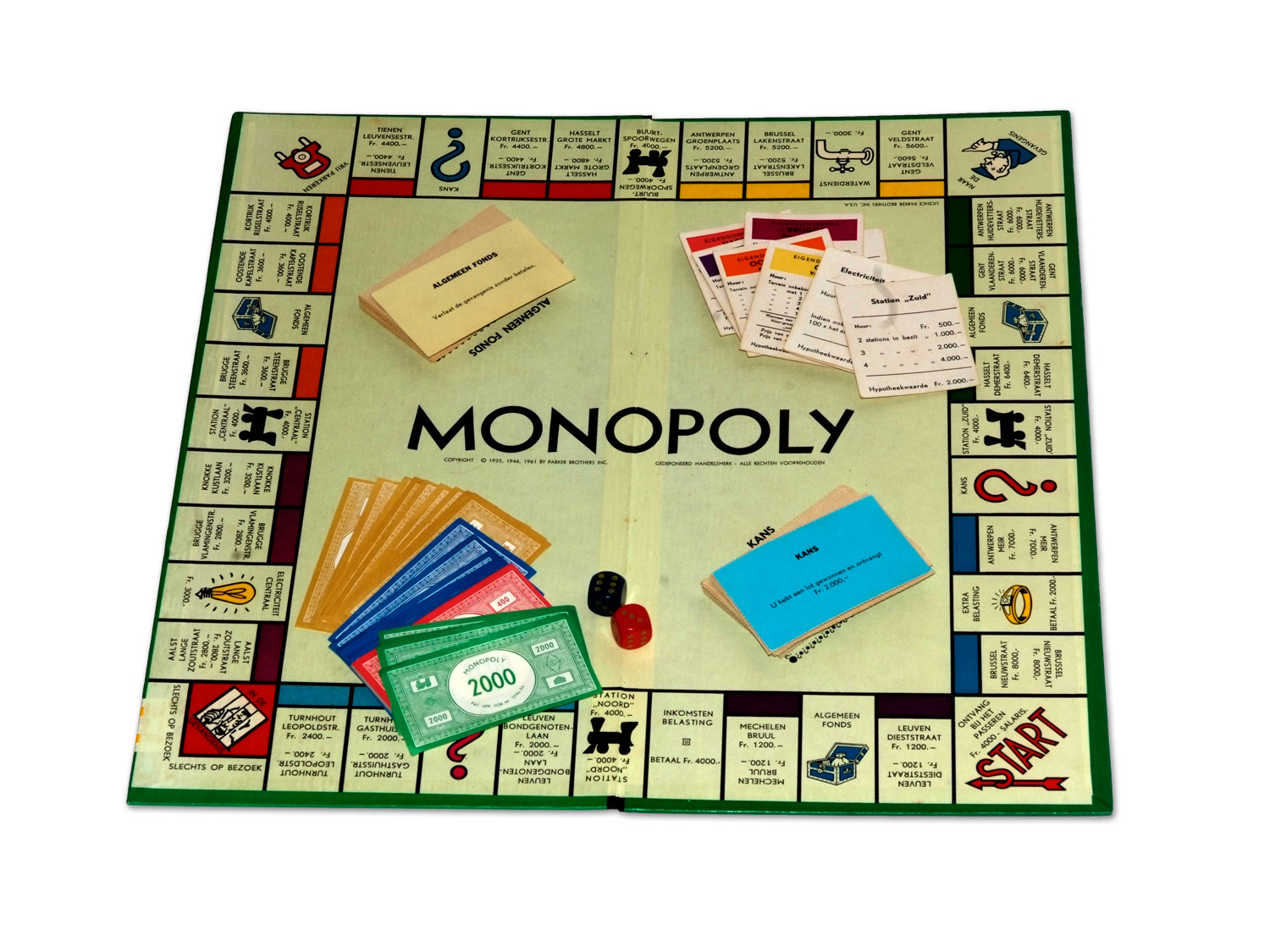
Belgian version of Monopoly (in Dutch)

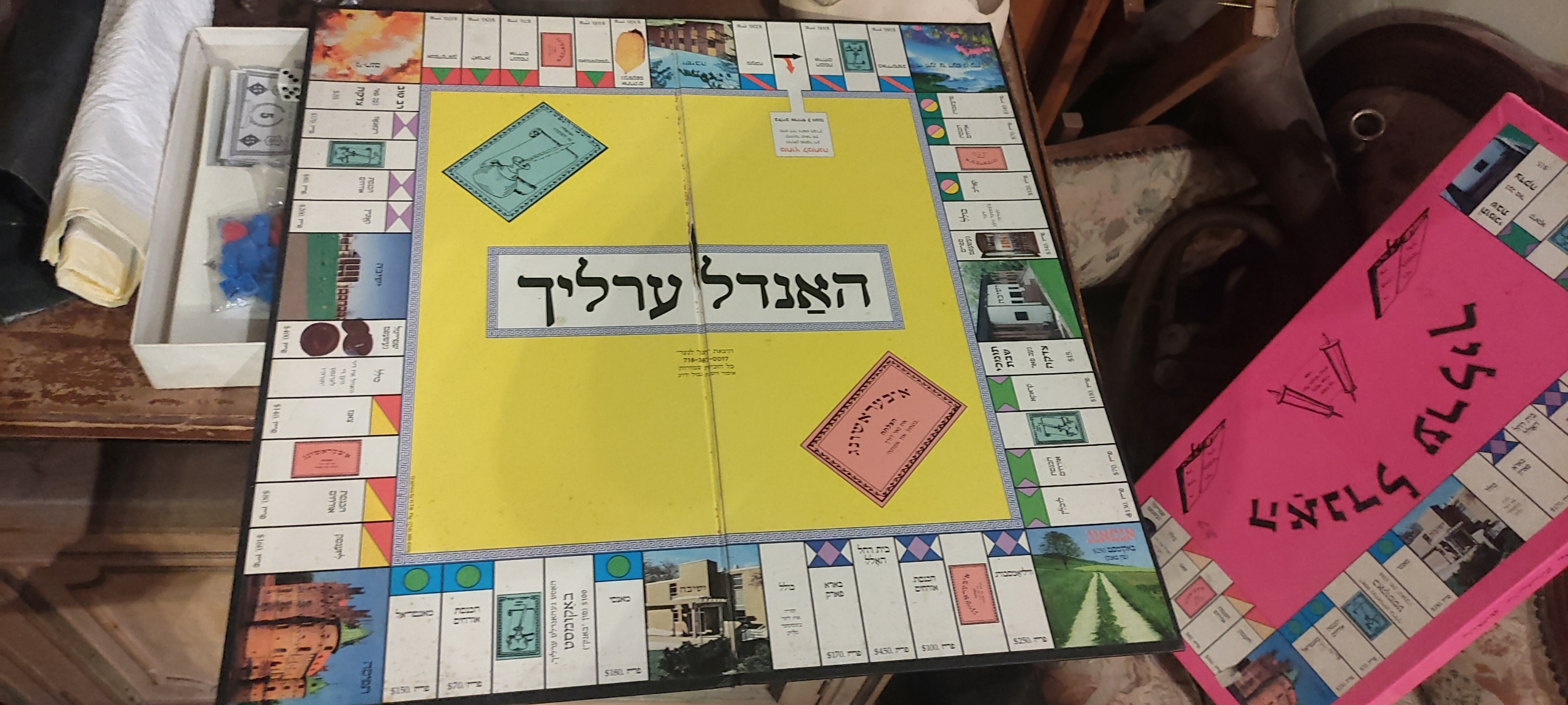
American Jewish communities version of Monopoly (in Yiddish)

Pre-Euro German editions of the game started with 30,000 "Spielmark" in eight denominations (abbreviated as "M."), and later used seven denominations of the Deutsche Mark ("DM."). In the classic Italian game, each player received L. 350,000 ($3500) in a two-player game, but L. 50,000 ($500) less for each player more than two. Only in a six-player game does a player receive the equivalent of $1,500. The classic Italian games were played with only four denominations of currency. Both Spanish editions (the Barcelona and Madrid editions) started the game with Pts 150,000 in play money, with a breakdown identical to that of the American version.

==== Extra currency ====
According to the Parker Brothers rules, Monopoly money is theoretically unlimited; if the bank runs out of money it may issue as much as needed "by merely writing on any ordinary paper". However, Hasbro's published Monopoly rules make no mention of this. Additional paper money can be bought at certain locations, notably game and hobby stores, or downloaded from various websites and printed and cut by hand. One such site has created a $1,000 bill; while a $1,000 bill can be found in Monopoly: The Mega Edition and Monopoly: The Card Game, both published by Winning Moves Games, this note is not a standard denomination for classic versions of Monopoly.

==== Electronic banking ====
Besides demonstrating the dangers of land rents and monopolies, Lizzie Magie also intended The Landlord's Game for children as a teaching tool to learn how to add and subtract through the usage of paper money, which was inherited by Monopoly and the vast majority of its spin-offs. However, some Monopoly variations use bank cards instead of paper money.

In these specific variations, instead of receiving paper money, each player receives a plastic bank card that is inserted into a calculator-like electronic device that keeps track of the player's balance.

==== As a phrase ====
Monopoly money is also a derisive term used in multiple senses. The most common is by countries that have traditionally had monochromatic currency banknotes (such as the United States) to refer to countries that have colorful banknotes (such as Canada). This has been used in places such as the "Weird Al" Yankovic song "Canadian Idiot".

It can also be used as a derisive term to refer to money not really worth anything, or at least not being used as if it is worth anything.

=== Tokens ===
==== Classic ====
Each player is represented by a small metal or plastic token that is moved around the edge of the board according to the roll of two six-sided dice. The number of tokens (and the tokens themselves) have changed over the history of the game with many appearing in special editions only, and some available with non-game purchases. After prints with wood tokens in 1937, a set of eight metal tokens was introduced. Two more were added in late 1937, and tokens changed again in 1942. During World War II, the game tokens were switched back to wood. Early localized editions of the standard edition (including some Canadian editions, which used the U.S. board layout) included the same wooden pawns used in Sorry!.

Many of the early tokens were created by companies such as Dowst Miniature Toy Company, which made metal tokens designed to be used on charm bracelets. The battleship and cannon were also used briefly in the Parker Brothers war game Conflict (released in 1940), but after the game failed on the market, the premade pieces were recycled for Monopoly usage. By 1943, there were ten tokens: the Battleship, Boot, Cannon, Horse and Rider, Iron, Racecar, Scottie Dog, Thimble, Top Hat, and Wheelbarrow. These tokens remained the same until the late 1990s, when Parker Brothers was sold to Hasbro.

In 1998, a Hasbro advertising campaign asked the public to vote on a new playing piece to be added to the set. The candidates were a bag of money, a biplane, and a piggy bank. The bag ended up winning 51 percent of the vote compared to the other two which failed to go above 30%. This new token was added to the set in 1999, bringing the number of tokens to eleven. Another 1998 campaign poll asked people which monopoly token was their favorite. The most popular was the Race Car at 18%, followed by the Dog (16%), Cannon (14%) and Top Hat (10%). The least favorite in the poll was the Wheelbarrow, at 3%, followed by Thimble (7%) and the Iron (7%). The Cannon, and Horse and rider were both retired in 2000 with no new tokens taking their place. Another retirement came in 2007 with the sack of money, bringing the total token count back down to eight again.

In 2013, a similar promotional campaign was launched encouraging the public to vote on one of several possible new tokens to replace an existing one. The choices were a guitar, a diamond ring, a helicopter, a robot, and a cat. This new campaign was different from the one in 1998, as the least-popular existing piece would be retired and replaced with a new one. Both were chosen by a vote that ran on Facebook from January 8 to February 5, 2013. The cat took the top spot with 31% of the vote, while the iron proved to be the least-popular classic piece and was retired and replaced by the cat.

In January 2017, Hasbro placed the line of tokens in the regular edition with another vote which included a total of 64 options. The eight playable tokens at the time included the Battleship, Boot, Cat, Racecar, Scottie Dog, Thimble, Top Hat, and Wheelbarrow. By March 17, 2017, Hasbro retired three additional tokens, the thimble, wheelbarrow, and boot; these were replaced by a penguin, a Tyrannosaurus rex and a rubber duck.

In April 2022, it was announced that a previously retired token would return to Monopoly sets. The candidates for reintroduction were the wheelbarrow, thimble, iron, horse and rider, boot, and money bag. One existing token would also be dropped from the line-up. Based on the results of the vote, Hasbro announced that the T-Rex would be replaced by the Thimble in regular sets of Monopoly starting in 2023. Another refresh of Monopoly followed in 2025, replacing the battleship with the previously retired money bag.

==== Special editions ====
Over the years, Hasbro has released tokens for special or collector's editions of the game. One of the first tokens to come out included the Steam Locomotive, which was only released in Deluxe Editions. A Director's Chair token was released in 2011 in limited edition copies of Under the Boardwalk: The Monopoly Story. Shortly after the 2013 Facebook voting campaign, a limited-edition Golden Token set was released exclusively at various national retailers, such as Target in the U.S., and Tesco in the U.K.

The set contained the Battleship, Boot, Iron, Racecar, Scottie Dog, Thimble, Top hat and Wheelbarrow as well as the iron's potential replacements. These replacement tokens included the cat, the guitar, the diamond ring, the helicopter, and the robot. Hasbro released a 64-token limited edition set in 2017 called Monopoly Signature Token Collection to include all of the candidates that were not chosen in the vote held that year.

== Rules ==
=== Official rules ===
Each player starts with $1,500 in their bank. Players roll the dice, and whoever rolls the highest number goes first. Play then proceeds clockwise.

On a player's turn, they roll the dice and advance their piece clockwise around the board the corresponding number of squares. Rolling the same number on both dice (doubles) allows a player to take another turn after moving their piece. However, if a player rolls doubles three times in a row, the player is immediately sent to jail and does not complete their third turn.

A player who lands on or passes the "GO" space collects $200 from the bank. Players who land on either Income Tax or Luxury Tax pay the indicated amount to the bank. In older editions of the game, two options were given for Income Tax: either pay a flat fee of $200 (or $300) or 10% of total net worth (including the current values of all the properties and buildings owned). No calculation could be made before the choice, and no latitude was given for reversing an unwise decision. In 2008, the calculation option was removed from the official rules. Additionally, the Luxury Tax was increased from $75 to $100. Nothing happens when a player lands on Free Parking.

==== Chance and Community Chest ====
If a player lands on a Chance or Community Chest space, they take the top card from the respective deck and follow its instructions. This may include collecting or paying money to the bank or another player or moving to a different space on the board. Two types of cards that involve jail, "Go to Jail" and "Get Out of Jail Free", are explained below.

==== Jail ====
A player lands in Jail by either:

- Landing on the "Go to Jail" space
- Throwing doubles three times in one turn
- Drawing a "Go (Directly) to Jail" card from Chance or Community Chest

When a player is sent to Jail, they move directly to the "In Jail" part of the "In Jail/Just Visiting" space, and their turn ends. They do not collect $200 for passing Go. If an ordinary dice roll (not one of the above events) ends with the player's token on the Jail corner, they are "Just Visiting", and can move ahead on their next turn without penalty.

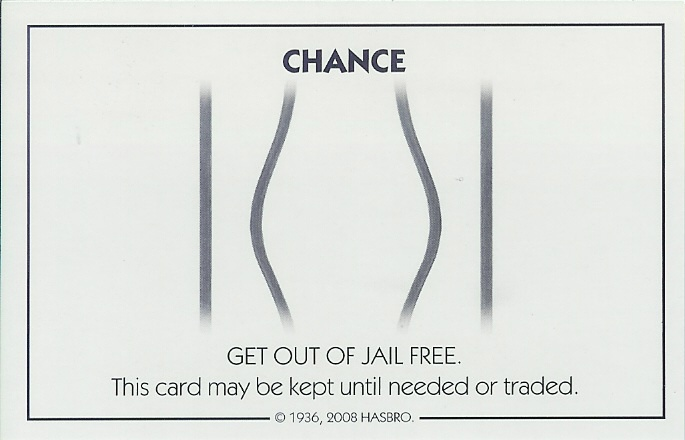
A Get Out of Jail Free Chance card

If a player is in Jail, they cannot move and must either pay a fine of $50 to be released, use a Chance or Community Chest Get Out of Jail Free card, or roll doubles on their next turn. If a player fails to roll doubles, they lose their turn. Failing to roll doubles for three consecutive turns requires the player to either pay the $50 fine or use a Get Out of Jail Free card, then, when they get out of Jail, move ahead according to the total rolled. Players in Jail may not buy properties directly from the bank since they cannot move. This does not impede any other transaction, meaning they can: mortgage properties, sell/trade properties to other players, buy/sell houses and hotels, collect rent, and bid on property auctions. A player who rolls doubles to leave Jail does not roll again. However, if the player pays the fine or uses a card to get out and then rolls doubles, they take another turn.

==== Properties ====
A player who lands on any unowned property may buy it from the bank at the listed purchase price. If the player declines to do so, the bank auctions the property and all players are eligible to bid, including the one who landed on it. If they land on a property that they own, nothing happens.

If they land on a property that someone else owns and is unmortgaged, they must pay the owner a given rent if the owner calls for the rent within a certain time (typically it must be called before the next one or two players have thrown the dice, depending on edition). If a player has insufficient money to pay the rent, they may only mortgage properties or sell buildings to avoid going bankrupt. Previous editions of the rules were widely interpreted to mean trading with other players was allowed to avoid bankruptcy.

If a player owns all the properties in a color group, the rent on the properties is doubled; and, if no properties in the group are mortgaged (see below), they can increase rent further by building houses on the property. A player may build houses on their own turn or between other players' turns. They pay the bank the cost listed on the property deed to place a house on the property. Houses must be built evenly on a group of properties: e.g., a second house cannot be built on any property within a group until all of them have their first house. Once four houses are built on a property, instead of building a fifth house the player may (for the same cost as building a house) return the four houses to the bank and replace them with a hotel, beyond which no further development is possible. If there is more demand for houses to be built than houses remaining in the bank, then an auction is conducted to determine who will get to purchase each house. Houses and hotels may be sold back to the bank for half their purchase price.

Railroads and utilities do not belong to color groups and may not have houses and hotels built on them. However, their rent increases if a player owns more than one of either type.

Properties with no houses or hotels on them can be traded or sold between players at any time, in any deal that is mutually agreed upon.

==== Mortgaging ====
Properties with no buildings on them can also be mortgaged. The player receives half the purchase price from the bank for each mortgaged property. This must be repaid with 10% interest to unmortgage. Players cannot collect rent on mortgaged properties. However, trading mortgaged properties is allowed, but the player receiving the mortgaged property must pay the bank the mortgage price plus 10% or keep the property mortgaged by paying just the 10% interest amount; if the player chooses the latter, they must pay the 10% again when they pay unmortgage.

==== Bankruptcy ====
When a player incurs debt to another player or the bank, the player must be able to raise enough cash to pay the full amount owed. A player who cannot pay their debts is considered bankrupt and is eliminated from the game. If the bankrupt player owes the bank, they must return all of their properties to the bank who then removes all buildings and puts them up for auction. If the debt is owed to another player, all properties are given to that opponent, except buildings which must be sold to the bank. The new owner must either pay off any mortgages held by the bank on the properties received or pay a fee of 10% of the mortgaged value if they choose to leave the properties mortgaged.

The winner is the player remaining after all others have gone bankrupt.

=== Official Short Game rules ===
From 1936, the rules booklet included with each Monopoly set contained a short section at the end providing rules for making the game shorter, including dealing out two Title Deed cards to each player before starting the game, by setting a time limit or by ending the game after two players go bankrupt. A later version of the rules changed the termination condition to one player going bankrupt, similar to the junior version, in addition to adding the time limit game, in the main rules booklet. Tournaments, which are played to a time limit, are played as standard games with no rule changes (no Title Deed cards handed to players).

In all short games (including tournament play), the winner (and other players who advance in tournament play) is determined by their score. A player's total score consists of cash on hand, added by properties owned based on the price printed on the board, mortgaged properties at one-half the price on the board (mortgage value), houses at the purchase price, and hotels, at the purchase price and value of houses turned in.

=== House rules ===
[V]irtually no one plays the game with the rules as written.

— Computer Gaming World, 1994

Many house rules have emerged for Monopoly throughout its history. Video game adaptations often include several house rules as optional features that can be toggled before starting a game. In 2014, Hasbro released a variant of the original game that included five popular house rules determined by a public Facebook vote.

One of the most well-known house rules is the "Free Parking jackpot" rule, where all the money collected from Income Tax, Luxury Tax, Chance and Community Chest goes to the center of the board instead of the bank. This may include an additional $500 to guarantee a minimum payout. When a player lands on Free Parking, they take all of the money.

Other commonly used house rules include; eliminating property auctions if a player does not buy an unowned property on which they land; doubling the money for passing Go if a player lands on the space instead ($400 instead of $200); preventing players from collecting rent, bidding during auctions, or doing any transactions while in Jail; awarding additional money for rolling "snake eyes"; allowing a player to loan money to another player; or enabling someone to grant rent immunity to someone else. Some players and tournaments add extra flexibility when settling debts by allowing property trades with other players.

Since these rules typically involve providing additional money to players regardless of their property management choices, they limit the role of strategy and can increase the length of the game considerably.

== Strategy ==
According to Jim Slater in The Mayfair Set, the Orange property group is the best to own because players land on them more often, as a result of the Chance cards "Go to Jail", "Advance to St. Charles Place (Pall Mall)", "Advance to Reading Railroad (Kings Cross Station)" and "Go Back Three Spaces" (New York Avenue / Vine Street).

In all, during game play, Illinois Avenue (Trafalgar Square) (Red), New York Avenue (Vine Street) (Orange), B&O Railroad (Fenchurch Street Station), and Reading Railroad (Kings Cross Station) are the most frequently landed-upon properties. Mediterranean Avenue (Old Kent Road) (Brown), Baltic Avenue (Whitechapel Road) (Brown), Park Place (Park Lane) (Dark Blue), and Oriental Avenue (The Angel, Islington) (Light Blue) are the least-landed-upon properties. Among the property groups, the Railroads are most frequently landed upon, as no other group has four properties; Orange has the next highest frequency, followed by Red.

According to Business Insider, the best way to get the most out of every property is to build three houses on each as quickly as possible. In order to do this, the player must have all the corresponding properties of the color set. Once every possible property has three houses, it is advised they then upgrade to four houses and then hotels.

=== Trading ===
Trading is a vital strategy in order to accumulate all the properties in a color set. Obtaining all the properties in a specific color set enables the player to buy houses and hotels which increase the rent another player has to pay when they land on the property. According to Slate, players trade to speed up the process and secure a win. Building at least 3 houses on each property allows the player to break even once at least one player lands on this property.

=== End game ===
One common criticism of Monopoly is that although it has carefully defined termination conditions, it may take an unlimited amount of time to reach them. Edward P. Parker, a former president of Parker Brothers, is quoted as saying, "We always felt that forty-five minutes was about the right length for a game, but Monopoly could go on for hours. Also, a game was supposed to have a definite end somewhere. In Monopoly you kept going around and around."

Hasbro states that the longest game of Monopoly ever played lasted 70 days.

== Related games ==
=== Add-ons ===
Numerous add-ons have been produced for Monopoly, sold independently from the game both before its commercialization and after, with three official ones discussed below:

==== Stock Exchange ====
The original Stock Exchange add-on was published by Capitol Novelty Co. of Rensselaer, New York in early 1936. It was initially marketed as an add-on for not only Monopoly, but also similar games such as Finance and Easy Money. Shortly after Capitol Novelty introduced Stock Exchange, Parker Brothers bought the rights and marketed their own version as an add-on specifically for Monopoly, which became available in June 1936. The Free Parking square is covered over by a new Stock Exchange space and the add-on included three Chance and three Community Chest cards.

The Stock Exchange add-on was later redesigned and re-released in 1992 under license by Chessex, this time including ten new Chance cards and eleven new Community Chest cards. Many of the original rules still applied.

==== Playmaster ====
Playmaster, another official add-on, released in 1982, is an electronic device that keeps track of all player movement and dice rolls as well as what properties are still available. It then uses this information to call random auctions and mortgages making it easier to free up cards of a color group. It also plays eight short tunes when key game functions occur; for example when a player lands on a railroad it plays "I've Been Working on the Railroad", and a police car's siren sounds when a player goes to Jail.

==== Get Out of Jail and Free Parking minigames ====
In 2009, Hasbro released two minigames that can be played as stand-alone games or combined with the Monopoly game. In Get Out of Jail, the goal is to manipulate a spade under a jail cell to flick out various colored prisoners. In Free Parking, players attempt to balance taxis on a wobbly board. Both add-ons can also be integrated into the Monopoly game. Adding Free Parking allows players to take the "Taxi Challenge" when they land on Free Parking, and if successful, can move to any space on the board. Adding Get Out of Jail replaces the mechanic of rolling doubles to get out of jail with successfully flicking a prisoner out of the jail.

==== Speed Die ====
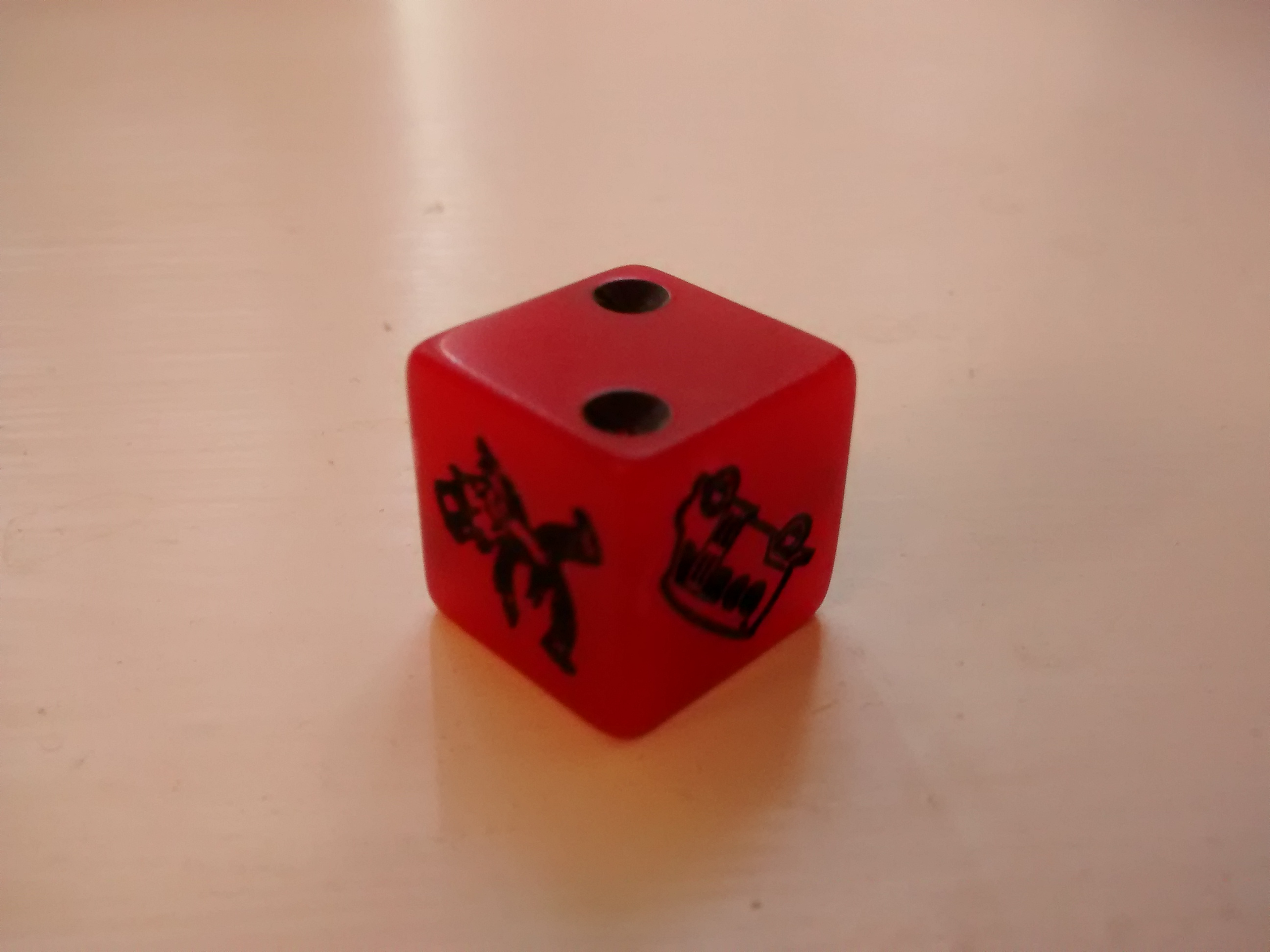
The Speed Die

First included in Winning Moves' Monopoly: The Mega Edition, this third, six-sided die is rolled with the other two, and accelerates gameplay when in use. In 2007, Parker Brothers began releasing its standard version (also called the Speed Die Edition) of Monopoly with the same die (originally in blue, later in red). Its faces are: 1, 2, 3, two "Mr. Monopoly" sides, and a bus. The numbers behave as normal, adding to the other two dice, unless a "triple" is rolled, in which case the player can move to any space on the board. If "Mr. Monopoly" is rolled while there are unowned properties, the player advances forward to the nearest one. Otherwise, the player advances to the nearest property on which rent is owed. In The Mega Edition, rolling the bus allows the player to take the regular dice move, then either take a bus ticket or move to the nearest draw card space.

The Mega Edition's rules specify that triples do not count as doubles for going to jail as the player does not roll again. Used in a regular edition, the bus (properly "get off the bus") allows the player to use only one of the two numbered dice or the sum of both, thus a roll of 1, 5, and bus would let the player choose between moving 1, 5, or 6 spaces. The Speed Die is used throughout the game in the Mega Edition, while in the regular edition it is used by any player who has passed GO at least once. In these editions it remains optional, although use of the Speed Die was made mandatory for use in the 2009 U.S. and World Monopoly Championship.

==== 2025 expansion packs ====
On January 7, 2025, three expansion packs were released as part of a broader update to the game. In all three versions, the game ends when one player goes bankrupt or all available properties are purchased, and the standard short game scoring is used to determine the winner.

- Buy Everything: This expansion introduces a buy die, a sale vault, sale cards, and additional title deeds for spaces that normally do not have one, such as Go. Players also start with an additional $650. Each turn, players roll the buy die after rolling the regular dice. The game also features new win conditions on the sale cards.
- Free Parking Jackpot: This expansion adds a Free Parking spinner and designates the Chance and Community Chest spaces as "spin spaces" where a player gets a spin of the Free Parking spinner. Payments and penalties are placed in the Jackpot. This also introduces the "Deal Mobile" token that allows players to buy unowned properties at will and skip out on rent.
- Go to Jail: This expansion adds Corruption cards and a Super Jail that players may be sent to. The tax spaces are also replaced by Go to Jail spaces. When the game ends, all players currently in Jail or Super Jail are automatically eliminated.

=== Spin-offs ===
Parker Brothers and its licensees have also sold several spin-offs of Monopoly. These are not add-ons, as they do not function as an addition to the Monopoly game, but are simply additional games with the flavor of Monopoly:

- Advance to Boardwalk board game (1985): Focusing mainly on building the most hotels along the Boardwalk.
- Don't Go to Jail: Dice game originally released by Parker Brothers; roll combinations of dice to create color groups for points before rolling the words "GO" "TO" and "JAIL" (which forfeits all earned points for the turn).
- Monopoly DICED!: A deluxe, travel edition re-release of Don't Go To Jail, replacing the word dice with "Officer Jones" dice and adding an eleventh die, Houses & Hotels, and a self-contained game container/dice roller & keeper.
- Free Parking card game (1988) A more complex card game released by Parker Brothers, with several similarities to the card game Mille Bornes. Uses cards to either add time to parking meters, or spend the time doing activities to earn points. Includes a deck of Second Chance cards that further alter gameplay. Two editions were made; minor differences in card art and Second Chance cards in each edition.
- Monopoly City: Gameplay retains similar flavor, but has been made significantly more complex in this version. The traditional properties are replaced by "districts" mapped to the previously underutilized real estate in the centre of the board.
- Monopoly Deal: The card game version of Monopoly. Players attempt to complete three property groups by playing property, cash & event cards with a deck of 110 cards.
- Monopoly Junior board game (first published 1990, multiple variations since): A simplified version of the original game for young children.
- Monopoly Town by Parker Brothers / Hasbro (2008) a young children's game of racing designed to help them learn to count.
- The Mad Magazine Game (1979): Gameplay is similar, but the goals and directions often opposite to those of Monopoly; the object is for players to lose all of their money.

=== Monopoly for Sore Losers ===
Monopoly for Sore Losers is a spin-off of Monopoly. It was published in 2020 by Hasbro and, according to the box, "creates—and celebrates—sore losers".

Its main difference from standard Monopoly is the introduction of a sore loser mechanic, which allows players to temporarily assume control of a special token that protects them from most negative effects of landing on board spaces—at their opponents' expense.

==== Gameplay differences from regular Monopoly ====
During the initial roll to determine turn order, the player with the lowest total goes first.

The main difference from standard Monopoly is the introduction of the sore loser mechanic. Each player is given 2 sore loser coins upon the start of the game, and the remainder are placed in the centre of the board. A player collects a sore loser coin from the Bank if they have to do any of the following: pay rent to another player, pay taxes and bills to the Bank, go to jail, land on a property that they own, or draw a Chance or Community Chest card that instructs them to collect a coin. If a player lands on Free Parking, they are allowed to steal a sore loser coin from another player, which could be traded.

A player may not collect a sore loser coin if they have four. At the beginning of their turn, a player with four sore loser coins, may place them in the centre of the board. That player then takes the Mr. Monopoly token and replaces their token with the Mr. Monopoly token—their normal token being placed in the centre of the board. Whilst a player is Mr. Monopoly, they cannot collect sore loser coins, and the actions they take when landing on spaces are altered, including collecting money when landing on the properties of other players, collecting money from the bank when landing on a tax or bill space, not go to jail, and requiring other players to lose sore loser coins.

Whenever any player, including Mr. Monopoly's owner, rolls doubles, Mr. Monopoly's owner is allowed to place one free house on any street on the board. The property selected for this free house does not need to be owned by Mr. Monopoly, nor does it need to be part of a complete set, and placing doubles houses unevenly is also allowed. However, Mr. Monopoly's owner may not place this free house on a street that already has four houses, nor may they upgrade to a hotel.

Buildings are permanent and could not be sold. If a property with buildings on it is traded away, the buildings remain and start providing rent to the new owner.

If Mr. Monopoly's dice roll makes him land on the same space as another player, the Mr. Monopoly token is placed over that other player's token, and Mr. Monopoly's owner is allowed to steal one property from the player he landed on—said property must not be part of a complete set. If a property with buildings on it is stolen, the buildings remain on the property and start providing rent to Mr. Monopoly's owner. In addition, whilst a player is under Mr. Monopoly, they are trapped—their turn will be skipped until Mr. Monopoly moves, but those players can still take part in auctions and trade. If Mr. Monopoly lands on the Jail space, he traps other players on both spaces. However, these actions could not be taken if a player becomes Mr. Monopoly whilst on the same space as another player.

Once Mr. Monopoly is in play, if another player cashes in their sore loser coins to become him, the old owner restores their normal token to the space they are on, and Mr. Monopoly is transferred to the space of the new owner, whose token is placed in the centre of the board.

If a player goes bankrupt, their sore loser coins are returned to the centre of the board.

The game is ended through one of two means- bankruptcy or all of the properties have been purchased. If the latter happens, players must return to Go, with Mr. Monopoly's owner not allowed to steal a property when they land on Go for the final time. Players subsequently collect rent from all of their properties, according to full colour sets and development, and after that the player with the most capital is the winner.

=== Video games ===
Besides the many variants of the actual game (and the Monopoly Junior spin-off) released in either video game or computer game formats (e.g., Commodore 64, Macintosh, Windows-based PC, Game Boy, Game Boy Advance, Nintendo Entertainment System, iPad, Genesis, Super NES, etc.), two spin-off computer games have been created. In 1995, Hasbro released their first in-house Monopoly video game. An electronic hand-held version was marketed from 1997 to 2001. Notable recent releases include:

- Monopoly: The iPhone game designed by Electronic Arts.
- Monopoly Millionaires: The Facebook game designed by Playfish.
- Monopoly Streets: A video game played for the Xbox 360, Wii, and PlayStation 3. The video game includes properties now played on a street.
- Monopoly Tycoon: A game where players build businesses on the properties they own.
- Monopoly Plus: A game for the Xbox One, Nintendo Switch, and PlayStation 4 with high definition graphics.
- Monopoly: The mobile game on iOS and Android devices designed by Marmalade Game Studios.
- Monopoly Go!: Monopoly Go! was released on April 11, 2023, for mobile devices (Android and iOS) by Scopely. After its first year, it became the most popular mobile game of 2023, generating more than $2 billion in revenue.

=== Gambling games ===
Monopoly-themed slot machines and lotteries have been produced by WMS Gaming in conjunction with International Game Technology for land-based casinos. WagerWorks, who have the online rights to Monopoly, have created online Monopoly themed games.

London's Gamesys Group have also developed Monopoly-themed gambling games. The British quiz machine brand itbox also supports a Monopoly trivia and chance game.

There was also a live, online version of Monopoly. Six painted taxis drive around London picking up passengers. When the taxis reach their final destination, the region of London that they are in is displayed on the online board. This version takes far longer to play than board-game Monopoly, with one game lasting 24 hours. Results and position are sent to players via e-mail at the conclusion of the game.

=== Play-by-mail game ===
Mail Games Inc. created a play-by-mail game (PBM) version of Monopoly, reviewed in the August–September 1990 issue of White Wolf Magazine. The PBM version was similar to the board game, although compared with many PBM games it was relatively simple. The game moderator processed players' turn orders simultaneously, but alternated the order that players' turns were initiated to allow sequential transactions as in the board game.

Stewart Wieck reviewed Monopoly, rating it a 2 out of 5 and stated that "If you enjoy Monopoly or want a low difficulty introduction to PBM, then this Monopoly game is the ticket, PBM offers a lot more engrossing games, but sometimes a game of Monopoly is hard to beat, especially if you can play by mail and not see the faces of the people whose economic ruin you are devising."

== Media ==
=== Commercial promotions ===
The McDonald's Monopoly game is a sweepstakes advertising promotion of McDonald's and Hasbro that has been offered in Argentina, Australia, Austria, Brazil, Canada, France, Germany, Hong Kong, Ireland, the Netherlands, New Zealand, Poland, Portugal, Romania, Russia, Singapore, South Africa, Spain, Switzerland, Taiwan, United Kingdom and United States.

=== Television game show ===
A short-lived Monopoly game show aired on Saturday evenings from June 16 to September 1, 1990, on ABC. The show was produced by Merv Griffin and hosted by Mike Reilly. The show was paired with a summer-long Super Jeopardy! tournament, which also aired during this time on ABC.

From 2010 to 2014, The Hub aired the game show Family Game Night with Todd Newton. For the first two seasons, teams earned cash in the form of "Monopoly Crazy Cash Cards" from the "Monopoly Crazy Cash Corner", which was then inserted to the "Monopoly Crazy Cash Machine" at the end of the show. In addition, beginning with Season 2, teams won "Monopoly Party Packages" for winning the individual games. For Season 3, there was a Community Chest. Each card on Mr. Monopoly had a combination of three colors. Teams used the combination card to unlock the chest. If it was the right combination, they advanced to the Crazy Cash Machine for a brand-new car. For the show's fourth season, a new game was added called Monopoly Remix, featuring Park Place and Boardwalk, as well as Income Tax and Luxury Tax.

To honor the game's 80th anniversary, a game show in syndication on March 28, 2015, called Monopoly Millionaires' Club was launched. It was connected with a multi-state lottery game of the same name and hosted by comedian Billy Gardell from Mike & Molly with Todd Newton. The game show was filmed at the Rio All Suite Hotel and Casino and at Bally's Las Vegas in Las Vegas, with players having a chance to win up to $1,000,000. However, the lottery game connected with the game show (which provided the contestants) went through multiple complications and variations, and the game show last aired at the end of April 2016.

=== Films ===
In November 2008, Ridley Scott was announced to direct Universal Pictures' film version of the game, based on a script written by Pamela Pettler. The film was being co-produced by Hasbro's Brian Goldner as part of a deal with Hasbro to develop movies based on the company's line of toys and games. The story was being developed by author Frank Beddor. However, Universal eventually halted development in February 2012 then opted out of the agreement and the rights reverted to Hasbro.

In October 2012, Hasbro announced a new partnership with production company Emmett/Furla Films, and said they would develop a live-action version of the game, along with Action Man and Hungry Hungry Hippos. Emmett/Furla/Oasis dropped out of the production of this satire version that was to be directed by Ridley Scott.

In July 2015, Hasbro announced that Lionsgate would distribute a Monopoly film with Andrew Niccol writing the film as a family-friendly action adventure film co-financed and produced by Lionsgate and Hasbro's Allspark Pictures.

In January 2019, it was announced that Allspark Pictures would now be producing an untitled Monopoly film in conjunction with Kevin Hart's company HartBeat Productions and The Story Company. Hart was attached to star in the film and Tim Story was attached to direct. No logline or writer for this iteration of the long-gestating project had been announced.

In April 2024 at CinemaCon, it was announced that Lionsgate and Hasbro Entertainment would partner with Margot Robbie and Tom Ackerley's company LuckyChap Entertainment to produce the Monopoly film adaptation.

The documentary Under the Boardwalk: The MONOPOLY Story, covering the history and players of the game, won an Audience Award for Best Documentary at the 2010 Anaheim International Film Festival. The film played theatrically in the U.S. beginning in March 2011 and was released on Amazon and iTunes on February 14, 2012. The television version of the film won four regional Emmy Awards from the Pacific Southwest Chapter of NATAS. The film is directed by Kevin Tostado and narrated by Zachary Levi.

It is the subject of Stephen Ives' documentary film Ruthless: Monopoly's Secret History which first aired on American Experience on February 20, 2023.

== Tournaments ==
=== U.S. National Championship ===
Until 1999, U.S. entrants had to win a state/district/territory competition to represent that state/district/territory at the once every four-year national championship. The 1999 U.S. National Tournament had 50 contestants—49 State Champions (Oklahoma was not represented) and the reigning national champion.

Qualifying for the National Championship has been online since 2003. For the 2003 Championship, qualification was limited to the first fifty people who correctly completed an online quiz. Out of concerns that such methods of qualifying might not always ensure a competition of the best players, the 2009 Championship qualifying was expanded to include an online multiple-choice quiz (a score of 80% or better was required to advance); followed by an online five-question essay test; followed by a two-game online tournament at Pogo.com. The process was to have produced a field of 23 plus one: Matt McNally, the 2003 national champion, who received a bye and was not required to qualify. However, at the end of the online tournament, there was an eleven-way tie for the last six spots. The decision was made to invite all of those who had tied for those spots. In fact, two of those who had tied and would have otherwise been eliminated, Dale Crabtree of Indianapolis, Indiana, and Brandon Baker, of Tuscaloosa, Alabama, played in the final game and finished third and fourth respectively.

The 2009 Monopoly U.S. National Championship was held on April 14–15 in Washington, D.C. In his first tournament, Richard Marinaccio, an attorney from Sloan, New York, beat two previous champions to be crowned the 2009 U.S. National Champion and took home $20,580—the amount of money in the bank of the board game—and competed in the 2009 World Championship in Las Vegas, Nevada, on October 21–22, where he finished in third place.

In 2015, Hasbro used an online competition to decide who would be the U.S. representative to compete at the 2015 Monopoly World Championship. Interested players took a twenty-question quiz on Monopoly strategy and rules and submitted a hundred-word essay on how to win a Monopoly tournament. Hasbro then selected Brian Valentine of Washington, D.C., to be the U.S. representative.

=== World Championship ===
Hasbro conducts a worldwide Monopoly tournament. The first Monopoly World Championships took place in Grossinger's Resort in New York, in November 1973, but they did not include competitors from outside the United States until 1975. It has been aired in the United States by ESPN. In 2009, forty-one players competed for the title of Monopoly World Champion and a cash prize of $20,580 (USD)—the total amount of Monopoly money in the current Monopoly set used in the tournament. The most recent World Championship took place September 2015 in Macau. Italian Nicolò Falcone defeated the defending world champion and players from twenty-six other countries. World Championships were planned for 2021, but were canceled due to the Coronavirus pandemic.

Date	Location	Winner	Nationality
1973	(United States) Liberty, New York	Lee Bayrd	United States
1974	(United States) New York City	Alvin Aldridge	United States
1975	(United States) Washington, D.C.	John Mair	Ireland
1977	(Monaco) Monte Carlo	Chong Seng Kwa	Singapore
1980	Bermuda	Cesare Bernabei	Italy
1983	(United States) Palm Beach	Greg Jacobs	Australia
1985	(United States) Atlantic City	Jason Bunn	United Kingdom
1988	(United Kingdom) London	Ikuo Hyakuta	Japan
1992	(Germany) Berlin	Joost van Orten	Netherlands
1996	(Monaco) Monte Carlo	Christopher Woo	Hong Kong
2000	(Canada) Toronto	Yutaka Okada	Japan
2004	(Japan) Tokyo	Antonio Zafra Fernández	Spain
2009	(United States) Las Vegas	Bjørn Halvard Knappskog	Norway
2015	Macau	Nicolò Falcone	Italy

== Variants ==
Because Monopoly evolved in the public domain before its commercialization, Monopoly has seen many variant games. The game is licensed in 103 countries and printed in thirty-seven languages. Most of the variants are exact copies of the Monopoly games with the street names replaced with locales from a particular town, university, or fictional place. National boards have been released as well. Over the years, many specialty Monopoly editions, licensed by Parker Brothers/Hasbro, and produced by them, or their licensees (including USAopoly and Winning Moves Games) have been sold to local and national markets worldwide. Two well known "families" of -opoly like games, without licenses from Parker Brothers/Hasbro, have also been produced.

Several published games like Monopoly include:

- Anti-Monopoly, one of several games that are a sort of Monopoly backwards. The name of this game led to legal action between Anti-Monopoly's creator, Ralph Anspach, and the owners of Monopoly.
- Business, a Monopoly-like game not associated with Hasbro. In this version the "properties" to be bought are cities of India; Chance and Community Chest reference lists of results printed in the center of the board, keyed to the dice roll; and money is represented by counters, not paper.
- Dostihy a sázky, a variant sold in Czechoslovakia. This game comes from the communist era (1948–1989), when private business was abolished and mortgages did not exist, so the monopoly theme was changed to a horse racing theme.
- Ghettopoly, released in 2003, was the subject of considerable outrage upon its release. The game, intended to be a humorous rendering of ghetto life, was decried as racist for its unflinching use of racial stereotypes. Hasbro sought and received an injunction against Ghettopoly's designer.
- Make Your Own -Opoly: This game allows players considerable freedom in customizing the board, money, and rules.
- Matador: The unlicensed Danish version from BRIO with a round board instead of the square one, cars instead of tokens and includes breweries and ferries to buy. The game also has candy and a popular TV series Matador named after it.
- Turism, a variant sold in Romania.
- Kleptopoly, released in 2017. It was inspired by the 1Malaysia Development Berhad scandal.
- Monopoly for Millennials, released in 2018, where players gain experience by traveling around numerous locations, such as vegan bistros, yoga studios, and music festivals.

Other unlicensed editions include: BibleOpoly, HomoNoPolis and Petropolis, among others.

=== Games by locale or theme ===
There have been a large number of localized editions, broken down here by region:

- List of licensed and localized editions of Monopoly: Africa and Asia (including the Middle East and South-East Asia, but excluding Russia and Turkey)
- List of licensed and localized editions of Monopoly: Europe (including Russia and Turkey)
- List of licensed and localized editions of Monopoly: North America (including Central America, but excluding the United States of America)
- List of licensed and localized editions of Monopoly: Oceania (Australia and New Zealand)
- List of licensed and localized editions of Monopoly: South America
- List of licensed and localized editions of Monopoly: USA (including the United States of America and all editions based on commercial brands)

=== Unauthorized and parody games ===
This list is of unauthorized, unlicensed games based on Monopoly:

Gay Monopoly

Copyright date: 1983	Released by: Fire Island Games, Inc.

Game description: Gay Monopoly – A celebration of gay life.
Tokens: Jeep, teddy bear, blow drier, leather cap, handcuffs, stiletto heel.
Other features: Board layout is circular rather than square.

Ghettopoly

Micropoly – The Microsoft Monopoly Game

Copyright date: Open source	Released by: The Micropoly Project	Issued through: Download

Free Software	XEROX $220	Download	SGI $220	APPLE $240	Internet Service Provider; AOL $200	REAL NETWORKS $260	AMAZON $260	Television Network; MSNBC $150	YAHOO $280	Corrupted Registry: Goto Reinstall
3COM $200	Micropoly – The Microsoft Monopoly Game									HP $300
CISCO $180	Micropoly – The Microsoft Monopoly Game									IBM $300
Open Sources	Micropoly – The Microsoft Monopoly Game									Open Sources
NOVELL $180	Micropoly – The Microsoft Monopoly Game									SUN $320
Internet Service Provider; UUNET $200	Micropoly – The Microsoft Monopoly Game									Internet Service Provider; MSN $200
ADOBE $160	Micropoly – The Microsoft Monopoly Game									Download
ORACLE $140	Micropoly – The Microsoft Monopoly Game									INTEL $350
Computer Network; NETWORK SOLUTIONS $150	Micropoly – The Microsoft Monopoly Game									Antitrust Ruling (pay $75)
NETSCAPE $140	Micropoly – The Microsoft Monopoly Game									MICROSOFT $400
Reinstall Windows/Just Rebooting	DELL $120	COMPAQ $100	Download	MOTOROLA $100	Internet Service Provider; MINDSPRING $200	Deposition (pay 10% or $200)	LUSH CREATIONS $60	Open Sources	AETHER-SPHERE $60	Start; Collect $200 salary as you pass

Game description: A parody game based on Anti-Monopoly.
Other features: Chance is Download, Community Chest is Open Sources and the Railroads are Internet Service Provider(s).

=== World editions ===
Monopoly Here and Now: The World Edition
- Publishers: Parker Brothers
- Players: 2–6
- Setup time: 5–15 minutes
- Playing time: About 1.5 hours
- Chance: High (dice rolling, card drawing)
- Skills: Negotiation, basic resource management

In 2008, Hasbro released Monopoly Here and Now: The World Edition. This world edition features top locations of the world. The locations were decided by votes over the Internet. The result of the voting was announced on August 20, 2008.

Out of these, Gdynia is especially notable, as it is by far the smallest city of those featured and won the vote as a "wild card" along with Taipei thanks to its residents and supporters.

It is also notable that three cities (Montreal, Toronto, and Vancouver) are from Canada and three other cities (Beijing, Hong Kong, and Shanghai) are from the People's Republic of China. No other countries are represented by more than one city.

Of the 68 cities listed on Hasbro Inc.'s website for the vote, Jerusalem was chosen as one of the 20 cities to be featured in the newest Monopoly World Edition. Before the vote took place, a Hasbro employee in the London office eliminated the country signifier "Israel" after the city, in response to pressure from pro-Palestinian advocacy groups. After the Israeli government protested, Hasbro Inc. issued a statement that read: "It was a bad decision, one that we rectified relatively quickly. This is a game. We never wanted to enter into any political debate. We apologize to our Monopoly fans."

Monopoly Here and Now: The World Edition (2008)

Free Parking	Sydney; ~~M~~2.2M	Chance ?	New York City; ~~M~~2.2M	London; ~~M~~2.4M	Monopoly Cruise; ~~M~~2M	Beijing; ~~M~~2.6M	Hong Kong; ~~M~~2.6M	Wind Energy; ~~M~~1.5M	Jerusalem; ~~M~~2.8M	Go To Jail
Vancouver; ~~M~~2M	MONOPOLY; Here and Now: The World Edition									Paris; ~~M~~3M
Shanghai; ~~M~~1.8M	MONOPOLY; Here and Now: The World Edition									Belgrade; ~~M~~3M
Community Chest	MONOPOLY; Here and Now: The World Edition									Community Chest
Rome; ~~M~~1.8M	MONOPOLY; Here and Now: The World Edition									Cape Town; ~~M~~3.2M
Monopoly Air; ~~M~~2M	MONOPOLY; Here and Now: The World Edition									Monopoly Space; ~~M~~2M
Toronto; ~~M~~1.6M	MONOPOLY; Here and Now: The World Edition									Chance ?
Kyiv; ~~M~~1.4M	MONOPOLY; Here and Now: The World Edition									Riga; ~~M~~3.5M
Solar energy ~~M~~1.5M	MONOPOLY; Here and Now: The World Edition									Super Tax pay ~~M~~1M
Istanbul; ~~M~~1.4M	MONOPOLY; Here and Now: The World Edition									Montreal; ~~M~~4M
In Jail/Just Visiting	Athens; ~~M~~1.2M	Barcelona; ~~M~~1M	Chance ?	Tokyo; ~~M~~1M	Monopoly Rail; ~~M~~2M	Income tax pay ~~M~~2M	Taipei; ~~M~~600K	Community Chest	Gdynia; ~~M~~600K	Collect ~~M~~2M salary as you pass GO

A similar online vote was held in early 2015 for an updated version of the game. The resulting board was released worldwide in late 2015. Lima, Peru, won the vote to hold the Boardwalk space.

=== Deluxe editions ===
Hasbro sells a Deluxe Edition, which is mostly identical to the classic edition, but has wooden houses and hotels and gold-toned tokens, including one token in addition to the standard eleven, a railroad locomotive. Other additions to the Deluxe Edition include a card carousel, which holds the title deed cards, and money printed with two colors of ink.

In 1978, retailer Neiman Marcus manufactured and sold an all-chocolate edition of Monopoly through its Christmas Wish Book for that year. The entire set was edible, including the money, dice, hotels, properties, tokens and playing board. The set retailed for $600.

In 2000, the FAO Schwarz store in New York City sold a custom version called One-Of-A-Kind Monopoly for $100,000. This special edition comes in a locking attaché case made with Napolino leather and lined in suede, and features include:

- 18-carat (75%) gold tokens, houses, and hotels
- Rosewood board
- Street names written in gold leaf
- Emeralds around the Chance icon
- Sapphires around the Community Chest
- Rubies in the brake lights of the car on the Free Parking Space
- The money is real, negotiable United States currency

The Guinness Book of World Records states that a set worth $2,000,000 and made of 23-carat gold, with rubies and sapphires atop the chimneys of the houses and hotels, is the most expensive Monopoly set ever produced. This set was designed by artist Sidney Mobell to honor the game's 50th anniversary in 1985, and is now in the Smithsonian Institution.

== Reception ==
Despite the game's legacy and forming a prominent aspect of modern culture, contemporary reviews of Monopoly are largely negative. On BoardGameGeek, the game is ranked in the bottom ten board games, with a mean rating of 4.4/10. Wired magazine believes Monopoly is a poorly designed game. Former Wall Streeter Derk Solko explains, "Monopoly has you grinding your opponents into dust. It's a very negative experience. It's all about cackling when your opponent lands on your space and you get to take all their money." Wired further observed that most of the three to four-hour average playing time is spent waiting for other players to play their turn, and there is usually little to no choice involved. "Board game enthusiasts disparagingly call this a 'roll your dice, move your mice' format." FiveThirtyEight also stated that the game suffers from issues of elimination and a runaway leader, problems that "most game designers nowadays try to avoid". The Guardian also describes Monopoly as "a collection of terrible design choices" combined with "an array of house rules that serve only to make the experience ever more interminable".

Games magazine included Monopoly in their "Top 100 Games of 1980", praising it as "the original landlord game in which players buy, sell, and rent Atlantic City real estate at pre-casino prices" and noting that at the time it was "so popular that Parker Brothers prints more paper money each year than the U.S Government". It was again included in their "Top 100 Games of 1981", noting that despite having been "Initially rejected by both Parker and Milton Bradley as containing 'fundamental errors' that the public would not accept", it became "one of the most popular games in the world, and deservedly so", and again in their "Top 100 Games of 1982", commenting that "The orange monopoly is the best [...] Try counting how many times you land on it as you leave jail."

== Reviews ==
- Family Games: The 100 Best

== Figurative language ==
Monopoly's popularity has led to it spawning a number of English turns of phrase. These include:

- Mr. Monopoly, the game's mascot character
- Monopoly money, a derisive term to refer to money not really worth anything, or at least not being used as if it is worth anything. It could also allude to colorful currency notes used in some countries, such as Canada.
- Get Out of Jail Free card, a popular metaphor for something that will get one out of an undesired situation without any repercussions. In 1567, the prize in Britain's first lottery, commissioned by Queen Elizabeth I and Sir Francis Drake to raise funds for England's navy, included a kind of "get out of jail free card" which offered a weeklong amnesty for criminals traveling for the purpose of buying a ticket, though in at least one case this protection was ignored. In 1967, one of the FBI's Ten Most Wanted Fugitives at the time, James Robert Ringrose, presented a Get Out of Jail Free card to FBI agents after he was arrested. In the U.S. Supreme Court case Hudson v. Michigan (2006), the Court ruled that use of evidence against a defendant obtained through search warrants if the police failed to knock-and-announce does not violate the Fourth Amendment of the United States Constitution. The majority opinion by Justice Scalia notes that suppressing evidence in such instances would amount "in many cases to a get-out-of-jail-free card." The Patrolmen's Benevolent Association of the City of New York, a large NYPD union, gives out cards to officers to distribute to friends and family, giving them preferential treatment for minor offenses. The cards are commonly referred to as "get out of jail free" cards, and are sometimes sold on eBay.
- "Do not pass Go. Do not collect $200" is a phrase used in Monopoly that has become widely used in popular culture to describe an action forced upon a person that has only negative results. The phrase comes from the game's Chance and Community Chest cards, which a player must draw from if they land on specific spaces. Each deck has a card that reads "GO TO JAIL: Go directly to Jail. Do not pass Go. Do not collect $200." Early in the game, going to Jail usually hurts a player as it prevents them from moving, which regularly leads to earning $200 from passing Go, and from landing on and buying property, though in the later game, jail prevents them from landing on others' developed property and having to pay rent. The cited phrase, "Do not pass Go. Do not collect $200", distinguishes the effect from other cards that move players; other cards use the phrasing "Advance to [a particular location]", which does allow the player to collect $200 if they pass Go during the advance. The phrase is used in popular culture to denote a situation in which there is only one immediate, highly unfavorable, irreversible outcome and has been described as a "harsh cliché".

== See also ==
- The Game of Life

== Bibliography ==
- "Monopoly World Champion". BBC. January 2, 2012. Archived from the original on June 19, 2023.
- Brady, Maxine (1974). The Monopoly Book: Strategy and Tactics of the World's Most Popular Game (First ed.). D. McKay Co. ISBN 0-679-20292-7.
- Darzinskis, Kaz (1987). Winning Monopoly: A Complete Guide to Property Accumulation, Cash-Flow Strategy, and Negotiating Techniques When Playing the Best-Selling Board Game (First ed.). New York: Harper & Row. ISBN 0-06-096127-9.
- Doll, Jen (February 5, 2015). "An Anti-Capitalist Woman Invented Monopoly and a Man Got All the Credit". The New Republic.
- Moore, Tim (2004). Do Not Pass Go. Vintage Books. ISBN 0-09-943386-9.
- Pilon, Mary (2015). The Monopolists: Obsession, Fury, and the Scandal Behind the World's Favorite Board Game. Bloomsbury.
- R. Ash; R. Bishop (1972). "Monopoly as a Markov Process". Mathematics Magazine. Vol. 45. pp. 26–29.
- Reader's Digest: The truth about history (2003) article "Monopoly on ideas".
- S. Abbott; M. Richey (May 1997). "Take a Walk on the Boardwalk". College Mathematics Journal. Vol. 10, no. 3. pp. 162–171.
