= Monopoly Deal =

Card game based on the Monopoly board game

- Players: 2-5
- Setup time: 1-2 minutes
- Playing time: 15 minutes
- Chance: High
- Age range: 8 and up
- Skills: Adding, Social skills, Strategy

Monopoly Deal is a card game derived from the board-game Monopoly. Introduced in 2008, Monopoly Deal is produced and sold by Cartamundi under a license from Hasbro. Upon its release, the game was generally well-received for its short playing time and playing interaction.

== Gameplay ==
Players attempt to collect three complete sets of cards representing the properties from the original board game, either by playing them directly, stealing them from other players, swapping cards with other players, or collecting them as rent for other properties they already own. The cards in the 110-card deck represent properties and wild cards, various denominations of Monopoly money used to pay rent, and special action cards which can either be played for their effects or banked as money instead.

== Video games ==
A video game adaptation for the PlayStation 3, PlayStation 4, Xbox 360 and Xbox One is (or was, at various points in time) available.

== Reception ==
Reviewing for Eurogamer, Christian Donlan described the game as "dynamic" and praised its playing time. Matt Jarvis, writing for Dicebreaker, described it as superior compared to the base game, complimenting its interaction and playing time, despite commenting that the game was "random and often unfair". Martina Kasanicka from Spieletest also commented the game as "snappier" compared to the base game.
