= Ghettopoly =

2002 parody board game

- Designers: David Chang
- Players: 2–7
- Setup time: 5–15 minutes
- Playing time: about 3 hours
- Chance: Medium
- Skills: Simple mathematics (such as counting, finding percentages and multiplication); social skills; negotiation

Ghettopoly is a parody of the board game Monopoly invented by David Chang, a Taiwanese American, and released in 2003. The game uses Monopoly-like mechanics but is themed around a caricature of a black ghetto in the United States.

== Gameplay and differences from Monopoly ==
In Ghettopoly, the four railroad properties from the standard version of Monopoly are replaced by liquor stores. Other properties include a massage parlor, a peep show and a pawn shop. The Community Chest and Chance squares become Ghetto Stash and Hustle squares, while taxation squares are replaced by police-shakedown and carjacking squares.

Instead of building houses and hotels, property owners in Ghettopoly build crack houses and projects. The seven game pieces include: a pimp, a hoe, a 40 oz, a machine gun, a marijuana leaf, a crack rock, and a basketball.

== Official description ==
"Buying stolen properties, pimpin’ ho’s, building crack houses and projects, paying protection fees, and getting car jacked are some of the elements of the game. Not dope enough?...If you don't have the money that you owe to the loan shark you might just land yourself in da Emergency Room."

=== Contents ===
- Game Board
- Loan Shark Tray
- 40 Crack Houses
- 17 Projects
- Pink Slip Cards
- Ghetto Stash and Hustle Cards
- 7 game pieces (Pimp, Hoe, 40 oz, Machine Gun, Marijuana Leaf, Basketball and Crack Rock)
- Counterfeit Money
- 2 Dice

== Racism and trademark issues ==
The game was criticized as offensively racist by a local chapter of the NAACP and by black clergy, as well as by Asian American groups, including the National Asian Pacific American Legal Consortium and Organization of Chinese Americans.

The game was pulled from the market by Urban Outfitters, just one of its many retailers. Chang continued to market the game without their support. According to Chang's website, which still sells the game, it is also available on Amazon. Another Monopoly variant, Redneckopoly, is also available at ghettopoly.com. Further such games were planned, including Hoodopoly, Hiphopopoly, and Thugopoly.

In October 2003, Hasbro sued Chang over the game's similarities to Monopoly. In January 2006, Chang was found in contempt of court for failure to produce documents. The court thus entered a "default judgment" for Hasbro's continued use of "Monopoly" as a trademark, and dismissed Chang's counterclaims, which were to revoke trademark status on Monopoly. In May 2006, the court estimated that Chang generated US$8,790,000 in profits from the sale of Ghettopoly, and that damages of $400,000 were reasonable as reflected in the court documents.

== See also ==
- Interminority racism in the United States, for a background on the issues
