= 1930s in games =

== Games released or invented in the 1930s ==
- Yacht (193?)
- Wahoo (1930)
- Towie (1931)
- Finance (1932)
- Monopoly (1933)
- Anagrams (1934)
- Sorry! (1934)
- Easy Money (1935)
- Stock Ticker (1937)
- Buccaneer (1938)
- Scrabble (1938)
