= 1920s in games =

see also: 1910s in games, 1930s in games

== Games released or invented in the 1920s ==
- Escalado (1928 or 1929?)

== Significant games-related events in the 1920s ==
- Henry and Helal Hassenfeld found the Hassenfeld Brothers company (1923), later shortened to the name Hasbro (1968).
