= Ms. Monopoly =

Board game

- The box art for the original release
- Publishers: Hasbro
- Publication: 2019; 7 years ago
- Genres: Board game
- Players: Minimum of 2, maximum of 6
- Setup time: 2–5 minutes
- Playing time: 30-180 minutes
- Chance: High (dice rolling, card drawing)
- Age range: 8+
- Skills: Negotiation; Resource management; Financial management; Strategy

Ms. Monopoly is a version of the Monopoly board game that highlights inventions created or contributed to by women and gives bonuses to female players. It was released by Hasbro in 2019.

The game replaces Rich Uncle Pennybags, the mascot on most Monopoly versions, with a young woman described as his niece. As part of the game's rollout, Hasbro sent three teenage girls a grant of $20,580 each to invest in their own inventions. Hasbro promoted Ms. Monopoly as the first game "where women make more than men". In a statement, Hasbro said that the game provides an environment in which "women have an advantage often enjoyed by men".

Upon release, the game was criticized for its gameplay mechanics of giving bonuses to female players, as well as ignoring the original Monopoly's creator.

== Gameplay ==
This is a variation of the game Monopoly, so only differences from standard gameplay will be listed.

Money bonuses are provided to female players. Women get $1,900 at the start of the game and receive $240 salary when passing “Go,” whereas men start with $1,500 and receive a $200 salary. Chance and Community Chest cards also provide different payouts between genders, sometimes higher for either men or women.

The buyable properties are replaced with "inventions" representing technology women created or contributed to, including Wi-Fi, to which Hedy Lamarr and Radia Perlman contributed; modern shapewear by Spanx founder Sara Blakely; and chocolate chip cookies, invented by Ruth Graves Wakefield. Tokens are replaced with new ones: a notebook and pen, a jet, a glass, a watch, a barbell, and Ms. Monopoly's white hat.

There are no houses, and instead of hotels, there are "headquarters." Players may buy headquarters for their inventions as soon as they have a color set. Headquarters may not be sold back to the Bank.

Inventions cannot be mortgaged; instead, players may sell their inventions back to the Bank at any time for their face value. Inventions with headquarters on them may be sold or traded without removing the headquarters from them. If an invention with a headquarters is sold to the Bank, the next player to acquire the invention from the Bank (either by landing on it and buying it or by winning it in an auction) gets the headquarters for free.

Railroads are replaced with "ride shares." These are no longer buyable properties, but instead when a player lands on one, they move their token to the next ride share space for free.

The game ends when all the inventions have been purchased. Then, each player collects rent from the Bank for each of their inventions, and the player with the most money wins.

Jail and tax spaces are maintained from the original game.

Free Parking	Edgeless Beauty Sponge ₩220	Chance	Dishwasher ₩220	Fire Escape ₩240	Ride Share	Windshield Wipers ₩260	Glare-Free Glass ₩260	Solar Heating ₩150	Life Raft ₩280	Go To Jail
Space Station Batteries ₩200	Ms.MONOPOLY									Bulletproof Vest ₩300
Coffee Filter ₩180	Ms.MONOPOLY									Computer Compiler ₩300
Community Chest	Ms.MONOPOLY									Community Chest
Hairbrush ₩180	Ms.MONOPOLY									DNA Model ₩320
Ride Share	Ms.MONOPOLY									Ride Share
Paper Shopping Bag ₩160	Ms.MONOPOLY									Chance
Illusion Transmitter ₩140	Ms.MONOPOLY									Stem-Cell Isolation ₩350
Wi-Fi ₩150	Ms.MONOPOLY									Luxury Tax (pay ₩100)
Home Security System ₩140	Ms.MONOPOLY									Chocolate Chip Cookies ₩400
In Jail/Just Visiting	Leak-Proof Diapers ₩120	Ice Cream Maker ₩100	Chance	Modern Shapewear ₩100	Ride Share	Income Tax (pay ₩200)	Acupressure Tool ₩60	Community Chest	Retractable Dog Leash ₩60	Go (₩240, if player is male, ₩200)

== Reception ==
Reception towards Ms. Monopoly was mostly negative upon its announcement. Eric Thurm, the author of "Avidly Reads: Board Games", said the game created a "surface-level fantasy world" where women succeed simply because of their gender. Madeleine Kearns of National Review called it "patronizing pointlessness". Queens College's philosophy department head Christine Sypnowich said it was "unhelpful to portray women as needing special advantages." Jennifer Borda, an associate professor specializing in feminist studies at the University of New Hampshire, suggested that it would be more suitable if male players instead faced challenges women face in the workplace. Mary Pilon, author of The Monopolists, criticized the game for failing to recognize Lizzie Magie, who invented The Landlord's Game, the precursor to Monopoly.
