= Easy Money (board game) =

1935 board game

- Publishers: Milton Bradley; Somerville Industries Ltd.
- Publication: 1935; 91 years ago
- Years active: 1935–1974, 2005
- Players: 2–8
- Playing time: 120'
- Chance: High (dice rolling, card drawing)
- Age range: 7+
- Skills: Negotiation, Resource management

Related games
- Monopoly; Finance

Easy Money or The Game of Easy Money was a board game introduced by Milton Bradley Company in 1935. Like Monopoly, the game is based on The Landlord's Game in the movement of pieces around the board, the use of cards, properties that can be purchased, and houses that can be established on them.

== History ==
Milton Bradley Company (MB) was one of the companies that Charles Darrow showed his Monopoly in 1934, but was turned down. After the success of Monopoly and Finance, Milton Bradley decided to issue its own version of Finance. Despite the Landlord's Game patents having expired and the auction-monopoly game itself having developed in the public domain, Parker Brothers sued Milton Bradley for patent infringement, and the latter was forced to license the former's patents to continue production of the game. MB was forced by Parker Brothers to make changes for its 1936 "New Improved Edition" issued in three separate versions, so that it no longer played quite so similarly to Monopoly. A design patent for Easy Money was applied for at the Patent Office and was either withdrawn or rejected.

A new board was made for the 1940s edition with a new box design in the 1950s. A final Milton Bradley edition was printed in 1974; in this version all dollar amounts had been multiplied by ten, and the board had been further redesigned to look even less Monopoly-like. In 2005 under license from Hasbro, Winning Moves republished the 1950s version with new property names.

== Game play ==
Easy Money is a member of the Landlord's Game/auction family of games, of which Monopoly is the most famous example. Players begin with a set amount of money. Properties allow owners to charge rents based on the houses purchased on that property. Players may trade or sell properties. Other spaces have a particular action that must be taken when landing on or passing over.

Key differences from Monopoly include:

- no "color groups" for properties (instead, a player must own one "street" on each of the four sides of the board before properties can be improved)
- no listed purchase prices for utilities or commercial buildings, instead they are automatically auctioned off by the bank to the highest bidder once a player lands on one of these unowned properties
- no Title Deed cards with printed rents and mortgage values (instead, the information is printed on the gameboard)
- instead of a shared pool of houses and hotels, each player has color-coded houses that are used to denote ownership of a property as well as the current rent value
- no dedicated "Jail" space
- no "Free Parking" space nor the optional "Free Parking jackpot house rule". Instead money collected from "accident" spaces officially goes to the "Hospital" space. When a player lands on Hospital, they may take that money.
- a "red traffic light" space (or spaces depending on the version), in which players pay a traffic fine for passing over instead of landing on those spaces.
- rather than the two card types in Parker Brothers' Monopoly (and early Finance sets) players draw "Give-or-Take" cards whenever they throw doubles on the dice, with similar rewards and penalties. Since there is no "Jail" space and thus no Get Out of Jail Free card, there is instead a special exception card for taxes and traffic fines.

Players start with $2,000 (rather than $1,500 as they do in Monopoly), and earn $250 (not $200) for completing a full circuit of the board. In the 1974 edition of the game, basic dollar amounts were multiplied by 10; consequently, these figures became $20,000 to start with and $2,500 for a full circuit, with commensurate increases in property values and rents.

A game of Easy Money ends when one player is not able to pay what they owe, and had sold or mortgaged all of their properties. At that point (if more than two are playing), the cash-on-hand of each remaining player, plus the value of each property owned (and not mortgaged), is used to determine each player's net worth; the player with the highest total is determined the winner. (One major flaw in Easy Money is that a player collects more by mortgaging than was paid when purchasing the property.)

Games can last several hours, but games with three or more players are generally shorter than a typical Monopoly session with the same number of players (as it is not a requirement for one player to force all of their opponents into bankruptcy).

=== Board ===
New Improved Edition (1936)

"YMCA"*/ "CITY HOSPITAL"*/ "Airdale Bus Line"/ "Radio Program Contest"*	Note Due*	Lincoln Avenue	Main Street	Auto Accident*	North Road	Real Estate Tax*	Orleans Avenue	Black Kat Night Club	Piccadilly Avenue	"L.M. Navigation Co."/ "Red Cross Contribution"*/ "Red Traffic Light"* X2
Kensington Avenue	Easy Money									Queens Street
Income Tax Due*	Easy Money									Roma Road
John Street	Easy Money									Glendale Kennels - Dog Races*
Espinola Lottery*	Easy Money									State Street
L.M. Telephone Company	Easy Money									Majestic Theatre
Ipswich Street	Easy Money									Tremont Square
Airplane Crash*	Easy Money									Union Road
Hilldale Street	Easy Money									Associated Airways
Grove Road	Easy Money									Venture Avenue
"Waldorf Hotel"/ "United Trust Co."/ "Interurban Transit Company"	Fifth Avenue	Eton Road	Boy Scout Contribution *	Dover Road	Beano - Bingo Game *	College Hill	Broad Street	Belmont Park Races *	Alameda St.	"Bonus"*/ "Start Here" *

* non-property spaces

=== Changes ===
From 1935 to 1936 editions:

- Give or Take space removed - Instead, if a double (e.g. 5 and 5) was thrown, the player took a "give-or-take" card.
- deeds removed with the colored houses representing ownership & property information directly on the board

== Reception ==
In The Playboy Winner's Guide to Board Games, game designer Jon Freeman noted that "it would seem at first glance that the opportunities for trading are wider than in Monopoly, but, unfortunately, such is not the case [...] Trading is limited primarily to the final stages, as players attempt to stave off bankruptcy by selling their property outright or trading it for something less expensive." Freeman also called the game "slow-paced and dull until play has reached the 'building' stage — which takes a while." Freeman concluded that Easy Money lacks the scope and complexity of Monopoly and was "certain to remain a 'poor relation' at best."

== Ea$y Money ==
In 1989, Milton Bradley published a similarly titled game, Ea$y Money, that was completely unrelated in look or gameplay to the original. In this game, players move around a board and are given the chance to speculate on Wall Street, gamble in Las Vegas, and play in lotteries.
