= Ralph Anspach =

American economics professor (1926–2022)

- Born: March 15, 1926; Danzig, Germany
- Died: March 2022 (aged 96)
- Education: University of Chicago
- Occupation: College professor
- Employer: San Francisco State University
- Known for: Monopoly legal fight
- Notable work: Anti-Monopoly game The Billion Dollar Monopoly Swindle
- Military career
- Allegiance: US; Israel
- Branch: Army; Mahal
- Service years: 1945–1946; 1948–1949
- Units: Artillery observation; Anti-tank

Ralph Anspach (15 March 1926 – March 2022) was an American economics professor and games creator from San Francisco State University. Anspach was a graduate of the University of Chicago and fought with the Mahal in 1948 in support of the independence of Israel. He is best known for creating the game Anti-Monopoly and the legal battles that followed.

== Life ==
Ralph Anspach was born on 15 March 1926 in Danzig, where he grew up and belonged to several Zionist youth groups. In 1938, he escaped Germany for the US. In 1940, Anspach lived on West 94th Street, New York, New York, with his father, mother, and brother. Anspach enlisted in the US Army, serving from 1945 to 1946 in an artillery observation unit based in the Philippines.

While attending the University of Chicago, he heard about concentration camp survivors' problem of being shuttled about and not being allowed into Palestine. Thus, he volunteered, under the cover of being an agricultural laborer, to fight in 1948 Arab–Israeli War on Israel's side as a part of the Mahal, the foreign volunteers. Anspach served in an anti-tank unit.

Anspach created the game Anti-Monopoly (published 1973), which resulted in a 1974 trademark infringement lawsuit brought by Parker Brothers. While researching the case, he uncovered the patents of Lizzie Magie for her Landlord's Game, a precursor to Monopoly. In 1979, the parties reached a settlement allowing Anspach to continue marketing Anti-Monopoly. In a 1983 US Supreme Court case, Anspach won the "Anti-Monopoly" trademark rights from Parker Brothers. He then wrote The Billion Dollar Monopoly Swindle, a book about the true history of Monopoly and his legal fight over the game.

Anspach died in March 2022, at the age of 96.

== Works ==
- Games
  - Anti-Monopoly
  - Original-opoly
- Books
  - The Billion Dollar Monopoly Swindle

== See also ==
- History of the board game Monopoly
