= Marven Gardens =

Historic neighborhood in New Jersey, United States

- Marven Gardens Historic District
- U.S. National Register of Historic Places
- U.S. Historic district
- New Jersey Register of Historic Places
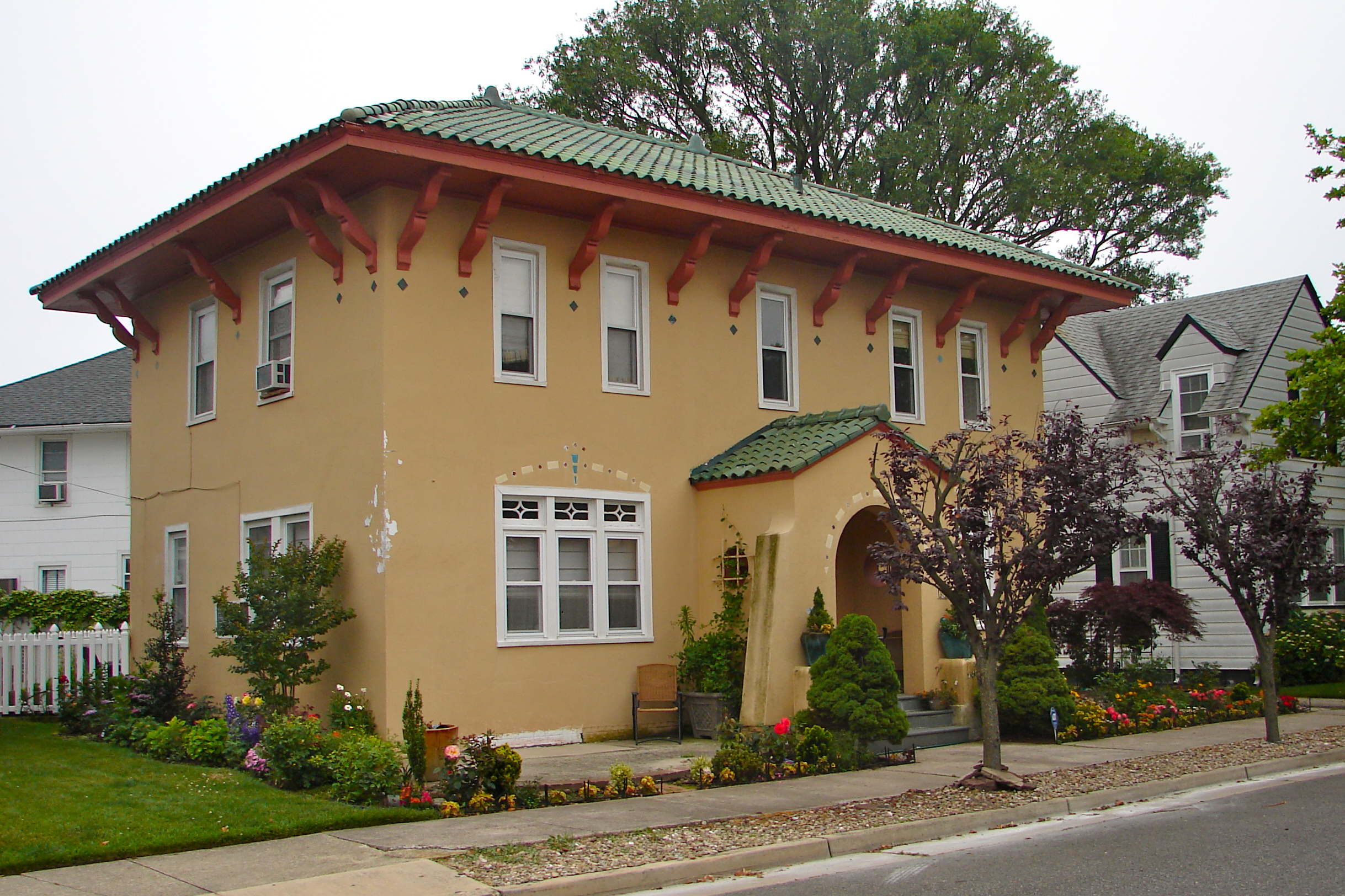

- Location within Atlantic County, New Jersey Location within New Jersey Location within the United States
- Location: Bounded by Ventnor, Fredericksburg, Winchester and Brunswick Avenues, Margate City, New Jersey
- Coordinates: 39°19′57″N 74°29′41″W
- Area: 16 acres (6.5 ha)
- Architects: Pedrick & Sons
- Architectural style: Tudor Revival, Mission/Spanish Revival, Dutch Colonial
- NRHP reference No.: 90001440
- NJRHP No.: 384

Significant dates
- Added to NRHP: September 13, 1990
- Designated NJRHP: August 9, 1990

Marven Gardens is a neighborhood in Margate City, New Jersey, United States, located on the Jersey Shore, two miles (3 km) south of Atlantic City. The name Marven Gardens is a portmanteau derived from Margate City and Ventnor City, because it lies on the border of Margate City and Ventnor City.

Marven Gardens is surrounded by Ventnor Avenue, Winchester Avenue, Fredericksburg Avenue and Brunswick Avenue. The streets within it are Circle Drive, East Drive and West Drive, and signs at the end of each of these streets pay homage to its Monopoly heritage, with "Marven Gardens" on a yellow background, and replicas of the house playing pieces adorn the posts on each sign. Most of the homes were built in the 1920s and 1930s, with over 48% of the neighborhood's homes being seasonally occupied.

== Historic district ==
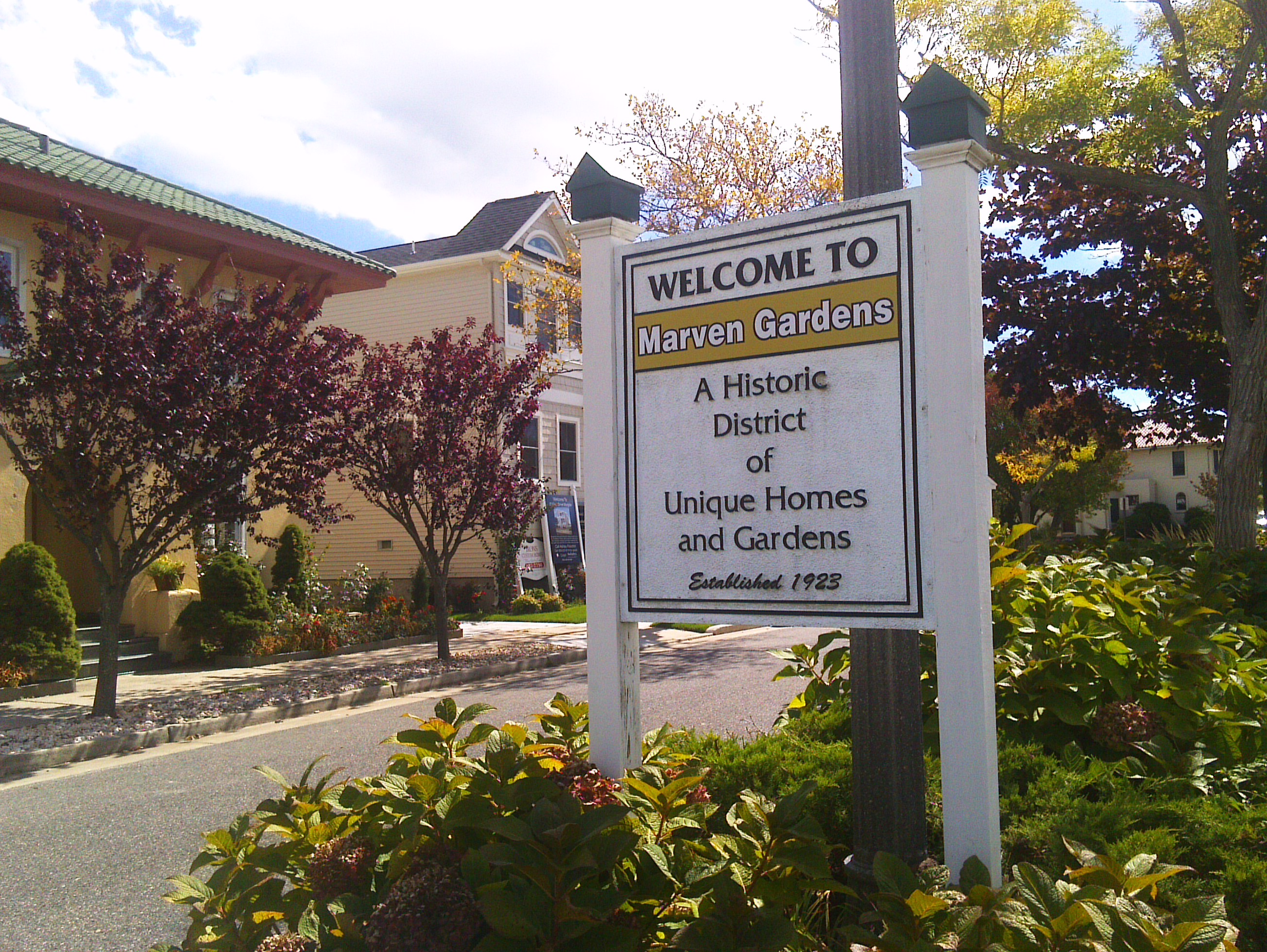
Marven Gardens in 2014

The 16-acre (6.5 ha) historic district encompasses the entire neighborhood. It was added to the National Register of Historic Places on September 13, 1990, for its significance in architecture, community planning and development. The district includes 105 contributing buildings.

== Monopoly ==
Marven Gardens is famous as a yellow property on the original version of the Monopoly game board, although the game misspelled the name as Marvin Gardens. The misspelling was introduced by Charles and Olive Todd, who taught the game to Charles Darrow, its eventual patentee. His homemade Monopoly board was copied by Parker Brothers.

In 1995, Parker Brothers acknowledged this mistake and formally apologized to the residents of Marven Gardens for the misspelling. It is the only property on the board that is not located within Atlantic City, although portions of Atlantic and Ventnor Aves lie outside of Atlantic City as well.

== See also ==
- The King of Marvin Gardens
