= Anti-Monopoly =

Board Game

- Manufacturers: Ralph Anspach
- Publishers: University Games
- Publication: 1973
- Genres: Board game
- Website: www.antimonopoly.com

Anti-Monopoly is a board game made by San Francisco State University Professor Ralph Anspach in response to Monopoly. The idea of an anti-monopoly board game dates to 1903 when Lizzie Magie created The Landlord's Game, which later inspired Monopoly.

== Background and history ==
Anspach created Anti-Monopoly in part as a response to the lessons taught by the mainstream game, which he believed created the impression that monopolies were something desirable. His intent was to demonstrate how harmful monopolies could be to a free-enterprise system, and how antitrust laws work to curtail them in the real world.

The game was originally to be produced in 1973 as Bust the Trust, but the title was changed to Anti-Monopoly. It has seen multiple printings and revisions since 1973. In 1984, a new version appeared as Anti-Monopoly II; this version was updated and re-released in 2005 without the numerical designation. The game is currently still in print, and is produced and distributed worldwide by University Games.

== Gameplay ==
The original Anti-Monopoly game begins with the board in a monopolised state, similar to the result of a completed Monopoly game. Instead of real estate and public utilities, properties in Anti-Monopoly are individual businesses that have been brought under single ownership. These monopolies are called "company cartels" and are split into three categories: Oligopolies, Trusts, and Monopolies; each of these requires a different amount of resources to topple. Players take the role of federal case workers bringing indictments against each monopolised business in an attempt to make the board resemble a free market system.

The game ends when one of the players goes bankrupt.

In Anti-Monopoly II, players do not all play by the same rules; at the beginning of every game, each person decides whether to play as a monopolist or as a competitor ("competitor" in this case meaning "aiming to win by legitimate competition rather than by monopoly"). This version plays more like the actual Monopoly game in that all the players buy and sell real estate, rather than working to indict monopolists as in the first version of Anti-Monopoly. Some of the rule differences between playing as a monopolist and as a competitor are that competitors charge lower rents and can improve any property they own at any time, while monopolists must own at least two properties in a group (thus beginning to establish a monopoly) before they can build on them, and charge much higher rents.

== Trademark lawsuit ==
In 1974, Parker Brothers sued Anspach over the use of the "Monopoly" name, claiming trademark infringement. While preparing his legal defense, Anspach became aware of Monopoly's history prior to Charles Darrow's sale of the game to Parker in 1935, and how it had evolved from Elizabeth Magie's original Landlord's Game into the version Darrow appropriated. Anspach based his defense on the grounds that the game itself existed in effectively the public domain before Parker purchased it, and therefore Parker's trademark claim on it should be nullified. The case dragged on for ten years, with numerous appeals and overturned judicial verdicts, until Anspach and Parker ultimately reached a settlement, permitting him to continue using the name Anti-Monopoly and distributing the game. Production resumed in 1983 after a Supreme Court of the United States decision ruled that Parker Brothers was not entitled to the sole use of the word "monopoly".

For a time during the dispute, the game was marketed as simply "Anti."

== Reviews ==
- Jeux & Stratégie #27

== See also ==
- History of Monopoly
