= Escalado =

Horse racing game

- Players: 2+
- Skills: Social skills

Escalado is a horse racing game created in the United Kingdom in which model racehorse game pieces, originally made of lead, make their way down a long green fabric race track to a finish line at the far end. The horses move along the race track by means of a mechanical hand crank that vibrates the entire track in a random fashion, so as to simulate the events of a live race.

Escalado was invented and patented in 1928 by Swiss inventor Arthur Gueydan and produced by United Kingdom-based toy company Chad Valley.

== Game details ==
The game is played by at least two players, one of whom must turn the hand crank that moves the game pieces along the track. The players place bets of whatever fashion they prefer on which of several distinctively coloured horses will cross the finish line first.

Originally, the game was released with five coloured horses made of lead, a green cloth fabric track, and a mechanical vibrating hand crank. Later versions of the game accommodated eight coloured horses made of non-poisonous metals (and much more recently, plastic) as well as yellow posts on the track that racehorses were to navigate around.

== History ==
On 24 August 1928, Swiss inventor and painter Arthur Gueydan applied for a United Kingdom patent being "The Concept of a Device to Impart a Progressive Movement to an Article and applicable in Toys, Game Apparatus, and other Objects". A month later, on 22 September 1928, together with the Chad Valley Company Limited, he applied for another patent for "New or Improved Apparatus for Playing a Race Game".

In May 1929, Toy Trader magazine wrote that Escalado was "The sensational Race game which broke all records during the last three months of 1928, and which is the biggest seller of all our games this year. In March 1946, the game was reintroduced in Toy Trader magazine with an extended track and support for a total of eight horses.

== In popular culture ==
The game features as part of the Hawksbee and Jacobs show on Talksport radio (UK). Listeners are invited to send in names of horses based on the main stories of the week and horse-racing tipster Charlie McCann provides the latest "odds" with Andrew McKenna providing a live commentary from the "course".

Roy Cropper was seen playing the game in Coronation Street on 13 September 2015 episode having found it in his friend Cathy's house. He proclaimed it his "favourite board game of all time".

In May 2019 a very early vintage edition of the game was restored in season 4, episode 26 of the BBC television series The Repair Shop, a programme in which experts restore family heirlooms and art objects for their owners. A repair was also shown in episode 2 of series 10, in May 2022.

The game was used and spoofed by Victor Lewis-Smith and his comedy partner Paul Sparkes in TV Offal and Bygones.
