= Wahoo (board game) =

Board game

Wahoo is a cross and circle board game similar to Parchisi that involves moving a set number of marbles around the board, trying to get them into the safety zone. The game is alleged to have originated in the Appalachian hills, but it is nearly identical to Mensch ärgere Dich nicht, a German board game originating in 1907. Most boards are used by two to four players. Wahoo has been a popular game for decades. Even today, custom-made boards proliferate on eBay and game manufacturer Parker Brothers has sold their own version of the game, under the title Aggravation, for decades.

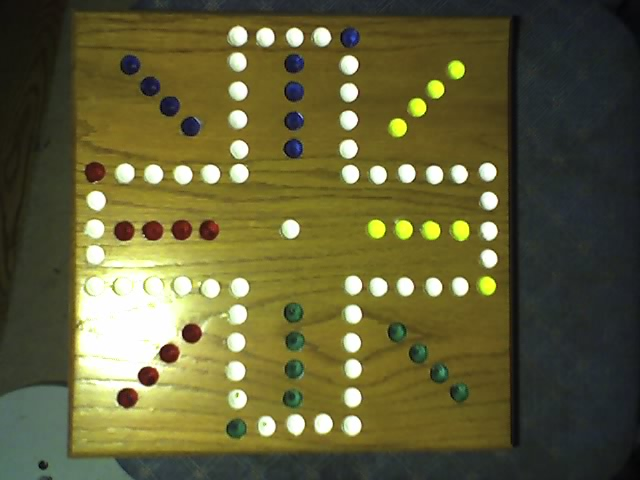
A homemade aggravation board

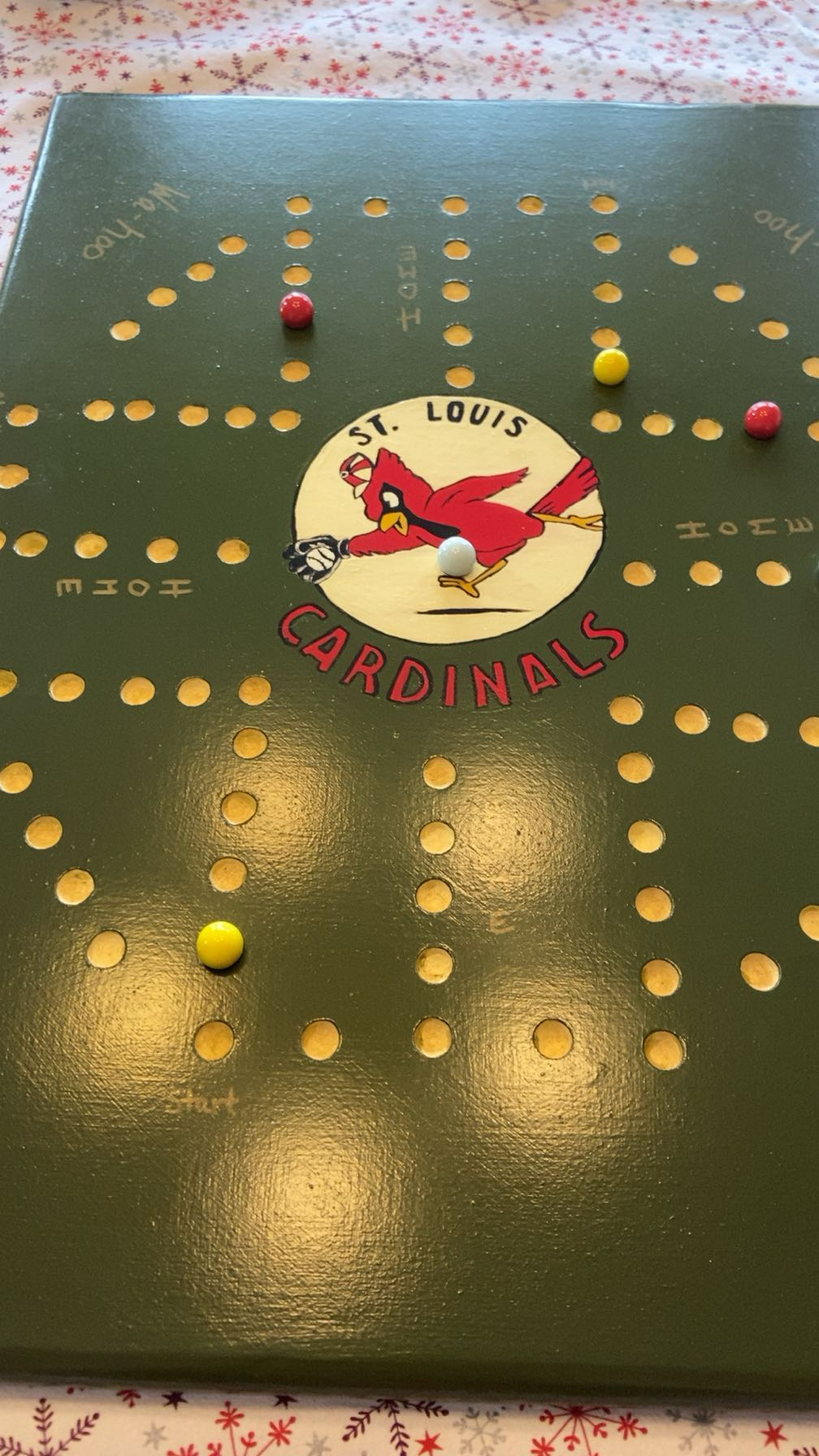
Custom wahoo board

The name Wahoo comes from a stereotypical Native American sounding name. Many boards would be adorned with caricatures of Native Americans. Despite its origins, many people would create their own Wahoo boards as not many were mass produced. There are old homemade boards on eBay and other sellers' sites dating back to the 1930s and 1940s.

== How to play ==
Number of players: 2 to 6

Objective: To be the first player to move all of their own marbles out of the Starting Area, around the board, and into Home.

Setting Up: Each player places his marbles in the starting area. After setting up, each player rolls the die. The highest number goes first, then play proceeds to the left. If two or more players roll the same number, they roll again to break the tie.

Die: The die that is being used in the game must be a normal six-sided die that has pointed corners. The sides of the die must be about a centimeter long.

Playing: To move a marble out of the Starting Area to the Starting Position, a player must roll a 1 or a 6. The Starting Position is the space just outside, and to the left of, the Home Area. After rolling a 1 or 6, a marble is placed on the Starting Position. If the player rolled a 6, they are allowed to roll again.

There is no limit to how many extra turns are allowed in regard to this rule. As long as a 6 is rolled, the player is allowed an extra turn. A player may never land on or pass one of his own marbles. If the number rolled on a player's turn puts him on or ahead of his own marble, he must move the marble in front.

If a marble lands on a space already occupied by an opponent’s marble, the opponent’s marble goes back to that player's Starting Area. If a player rolls a number that does not allow a marble to be moved, that turn is completed and goes to the next player in the sequence.

Winning: The game is won when the first person has all their marbles safely Home. They must roll the exact number of spaces to move their marbles into Home. If the correct number is not rolled, then the player cannot move, and it is the next player's turn. The game may be continued to see who gets second place, and so on.

With 4 or 6 players: When 4 or 6 people are playing, there are two methods of play. One is partners. When playing partners, players opposite each other are partners. A player are not allowed to "take out" their partner by landing on their partner's marble, and they cannot pass their partner. When one partner gets all their marbles "home", they then use their turn(s) to help their partner get their marbles home. The partners assist each other only when one partner is finished. The first pair to get all their marbles "home" wins (regular rules apply). The other method is every man for himself, or "cut-throat". When playing cut-throat, there are no partners.

== Local variants ==
In Nova Scotia, a variant of Wahoo exists played with cards instead of dice and using exclusively a six-sided board. By substituting cards for dice, the game becomes much more complex. Although it is possible to play with 2–6 players with a six-sided board, the game is commonly played with all six players playing in teams of three.

== Media Reference ==
- CandC Tube plays Wahoo (Marble Board Game)
