= Waterworks (card game) =

Card game

- Publishers: Winning Moves Games USA
- Publication: 1972
- Players: 2–5
- Setup time: 5 minutes
- Playing time: 15 minutes
- Chance: Medium
- Age range: 8 to adult
- Skills: Playing cards, Spatial ability

Waterworks is a card game created by Parker Brothers in 1972, named for the space Water Works in the game Monopoly. The game pieces consist of: a deck of 110 pipe cards, a bathtub-shaped card tray, and 10 small metal wrenches. The object is for each player to create a pipeline of a designated length that begins with a valve and ends with a spout.

Players race to be the first to complete a continuous, leak-free pipeline that connects their valve card to their spout card, while opposing players try to give them leaks that must be fixed.

== Gameplay ==
Players begin with a hand of five pipe cards and two wrenches. Cards used in play are lead pipe cards, copper pipe cards (invulnerable to leaks), and lead pipe cards that are already leaky. The valve card is placed on the table to begin a player's pipeline. The spout card is set aside until it is used by a player who has completed their pipeline, and then immediately the player ends the game by placing the spout aimed down toward the player.

A number of different pipe shapes (L-bends, T-pipes, straight, etc.) are represented in the game. Leaky pipes can only be added to the end or over the last piece of another player's pipeline, and players cannot add to their pipeline until leaks are repaired. Leaks are repaired by either placing an intact pipe of the same shape over the leak or placing a wrench on the leak card. Repaired pipes cannot leak again. Play proceeds clockwise and new cards are drawn after cards are played. Players always have the option of exchanging a single card rather than playing a card.

== Cards required to win ==
The minimum length of the pipeline required to win varies by the number of players, as follows:

Players	Cards
2	15
3	12
4	10
5	8
6	6

== Other rules ==
- Each player can do one of the following items: (1) place a "good" pipe card on your pipeline, (2) place a metal wrench on a leaky pipe in his or her own pipeline, (3) place a "leaky" pipe card on another player's pipeline, or (4) discard a card face up in the "discard" pile.
- When a wrench is played to fix a leaky pipe, that wrench can never be moved and this constitutes a complete turn. The player does not pick up or discard a card.
- When a player's turn ends he or she should pick a card (unless a wrench was played) and always have five cards in hand.
- Cards are always played vertically. No card can be played such that it is oriented 90 degrees, or "sideways," compared to the rest of the pipeline.
- No play is allowed which would create more than one leak on a player's pipeline at one time.

== Reissued edition ==
Winning Moves Games has reissued the game as Waterworks Classic.

== Reception ==
Games magazine included Waterworks in their "Top 100 Games of 1980", praising it as "a hilarious way to spend 20 minutes".

Games magazine included Waterworks in their "Top 100 Games of 1981", praising it as an "interesting card game".
