= Charles Darrow =

American board game designer (1889–1967)

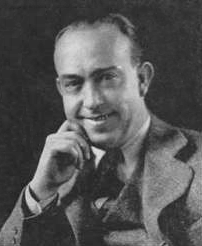
- Born: Charles Brace Darrow; August 10, 1889; Philadelphia, Pennsylvania, U.S.
- Died: August 28, 1967 (aged 78); Bucks County, Pennsylvania, U.S.

Charles Brace Darrow (August 10, 1889 – August 28, 1967) was an American board game designer often credited as the inventor of the board game Monopoly, which was published by Parker Brothers in 1935. However, the game's origins trace back to a Quaker folk game also called "Monopoly", which itself was influenced by another game called "The Landlord's Game" (also influenced by earlier board games), and patented by Elizabeth Magie in 1904. Darrow encountered this heavily modified version of Magie's game, made innovations and updates, then sold it to Parker Brothers, which marketed him as the sole inventor. The folk Game and the landlords game were largely ignored or forgotten until later historical research brought it to light in the late twentieth century.

== Personal life ==
Prior to his board game career, Charles Darrow worked as a heating sales engineer in Philadelphia. He and his wife Esther lived at 40 Westview Street, in an area then classified as the Germantown neighborhood (now Mount Airy). The house where they lived still stands. According to Darrow, he developed games while unemployed during the Great Depression.

While Darrow eventually sold his version of Monopoly to Parker Brothers, claiming it to be his own invention, modern historians credit Darrow as just one of the game's final developers.

== Monopoly ==
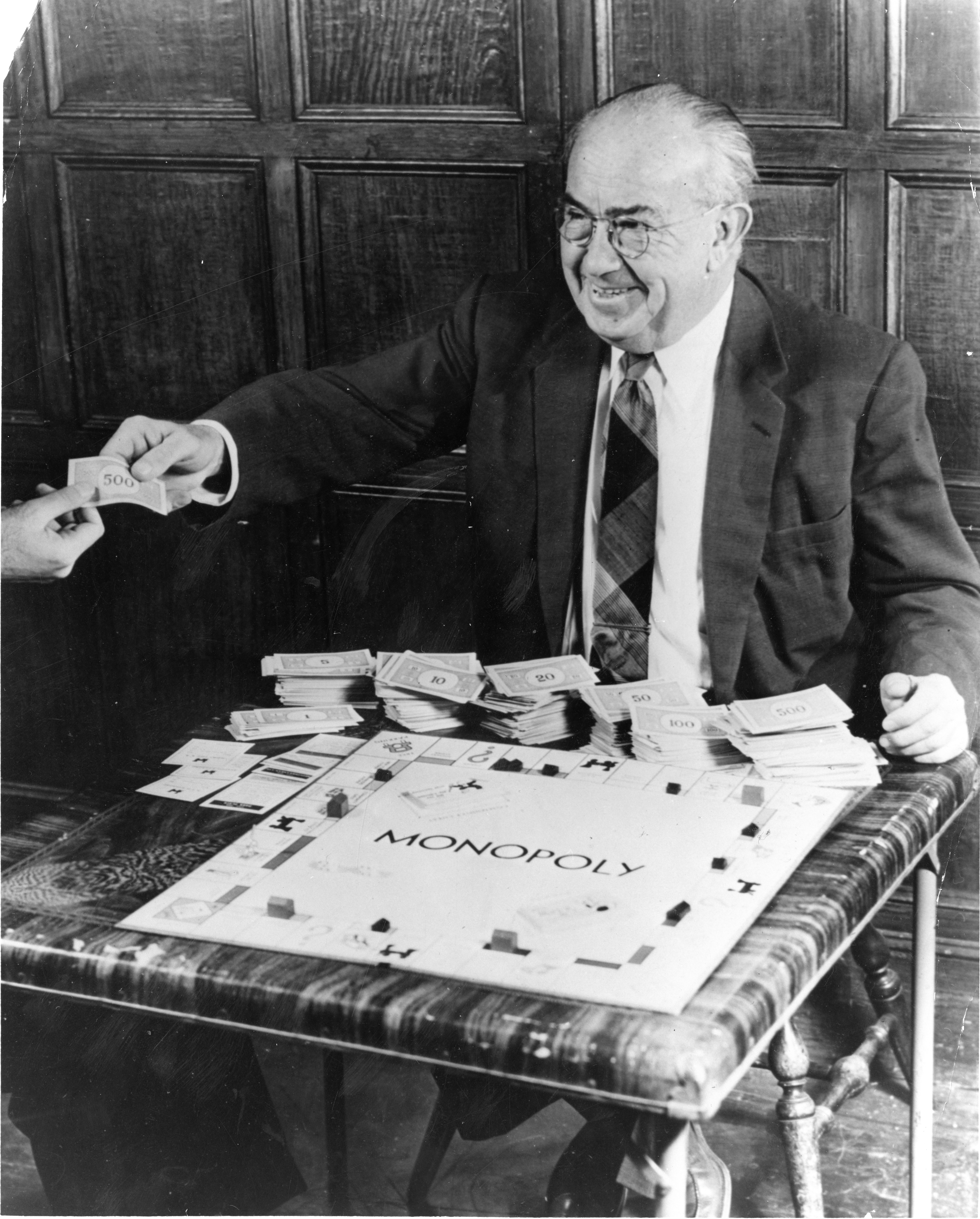
Darrow posing with a Monopoly board game set

Monopoly is a board game which focuses on the acquisition of fictional real estate titles, with the incorporation of elements of chance. After losing his job at a sales company following the Stock Market Crash of 1929, Darrow worked at various odd jobs. Seeing his neighbors and acquaintances play a board game in which the object was to buy and sell property, he decided to publish his own version of the game, with the help of his first son, William, and his wife Esther. Darrow marketed his version of the game under the name Monopoly.

In truth, Darrow was just one of many people in the American Midwest and East Coast who had been playing a game of buying and trading property. The game's direct ancestor was The Landlord's Game, created by Elizabeth Magie. The game was used by college professors and their students, and another variant, called The Fascinating Game of Finance, was published in the Midwest in 1932. From there the game traveled back east, where it had remained popular in Pennsylvania, and became popular with a group of Quakers in Atlantic City, New Jersey. Darrow was taught to play the game by Charles Todd, who had played it in Atlantic City, where it had been customized with that city's street and property names. Darrow later said in interviews that his game used local landmarks of Atlantic city "because that city was then symbol of pleasure for so many people."

In 2004 the PBS program History Detectives investigated a game board owned by Ron Jarrell of Arden, Delaware, which had elements of both The Landlord's Game and Monopoly. The investigators concluded that this game board had "key elements in it that link the Landlord's Game and the Monopoly Game together".

The Darrow family initially made their game sets on flexible, round pieces of oilcloth instead of rigid, square carton. Charles drew the designs of the properties with drafting pens, and his son and wife filled in the spaces with colors and made the title deed cards and Chance and Community Chest cards. On these early round boards, Darrow included some of the icons (actually designed for him by a hired graphic artist) that the later Monopoly made famous, such as the large red arrow for "Go", the black locomotives on the railroad spaces, the faucet on "Water Works" and light bulb on "Electric Company" and the question marks on the "Chance" spaces. Darrow then secured a copyright for the game in 1933. The next known versions he produced had printed "boards" on oilcloth squares with hand colored details.

== Commercial sales ==
By 1934, Darrow started having the game printed on cardboard, and sold copies in long white boxes to Wanamaker's Department Store in Philadelphia. Later that year, Darrow showed his game first to Milton Bradley, who rejected it initially, and later to Parker Brothers.

Darrow reinvested money from the sales into smaller sets, sold in black cardboard boxes, with boards sold separately from the sets. After Darrow started to take orders from other Philadelphia department stores, Parker Brothers reconsidered buying the rights to the game.

Parker Brothers negotiated the rights to produce the game in large scale from Darrow. Darrow sought and received U.S. patent 2,026,082 on the game in 1935, which Parker Brothers acquired. Within a year, 20,000 sets of the game were being produced every week. Monopoly became the best-selling board game in America that year, and it made Darrow the first millionaire game designer in history.

Parker Brothers also promoted Darrow as the sole inventor of the game, though later research has shown that Magie, Jesse Raiford, Ruth Hoskins, Louis and Ferdinand Thun, and Daniel Layman, among others, were responsible for many – or all – of the game's significant elements collectively. Darrow's contribution was the visual appearance of the game and the iconic cartoon-like illustrations on the corner spaces. He also standardized the number of houses and hotels (32 and 12, although in his oilcloth version it was 42 and 10).

A posed photograph of and a credit to Charles B. Darrow appear on a financial game copyrighted in 1936. In this case, Darrow was used as a "celebrity endorser", although he had not created the game.

== Later life and death ==
He said in 1958, at age 69, "I’m like the fellow who writes a successful first novel, but never a second."

He and his wife spent their later years traveling the world for three months out of the year, taking film photos of their travels. Darrow and his friends rarely played board games for entertainment, and he reportedly preferred contract bridge. "This is not a game playing group here," Darrow said about his social circle. "We mostly sit around and talk. Haven’t played Monopoly for 10 years."

In 1957, Darrow appeared as a mystery challenger on the TV panel show To Tell the Truth.

Darrow died on August 28, 1967, at his home in Bucks County, Pennsylvania.

== Legacy ==
In 1970, three years after Darrow's death, Atlantic City placed a commemorative plaque in his honor on The Boardwalk near the corner of Park Place.

In 1973 Ralph Anspach, an economics professor at San Francisco State University, produced Anti-Monopoly, a game similar to Monopoly, for which Parker Brothers sued him. During the ten-year suit, the Ninth Circuit Court of Appeals found that Darrow was not the inventor of Monopoly but had learned the game from others.

== See also ==
- History of the board game Monopoly
