= Stock Ticker =

Board game

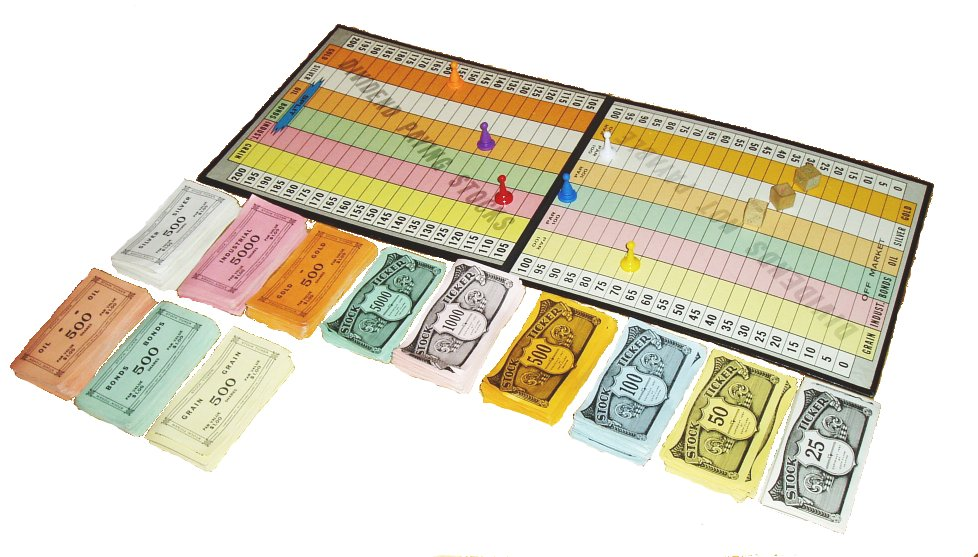
The board and equipment for Stock Ticker

Stock Ticker is a stock holding board game that was first released in 1937 by Copp-Clark Publishing.

== Game play ==
The game has six stocks, which in fact are commodities. These six are gold, silver, Bonds, oil, industrials, and grain. During gameplay all the stocks are identical. Each stock begins costing a dollar apiece. Players are given starting money of $5000 and they buy shares in groups of 500, 1000, 2000, or 5000. The stocks move based on the throw of three dice. The first die picks the stock that will be affected, with one of the commodities on each side of the die. The second die determines whether the stock will move up, down, or pay a dividend. The third die decides if the movement or dividend will be five, ten, or twenty cents. For instance, a roll of Industrials, Down, 20 will move the industrials stock from its start value of $1.00 to 80 cents. A roll of Grain, Up, 5 would move grain up to $1.05.

Dividends are paid out only for any stocks that are at or above $1.00 in value. For instance, a five-cent dividend pays five cents for each share owned. Thus, if a roll is Oil, Dividend, 10, and you own a thousand shares of Oil at $1.25 apiece you will receive a dividend of $100. Note that the dividend is not affected by the value of the share, with only the rule being that stocks worth less than $1.00 do not pay out when a dividend is rolled for them.

If a stock ever reaches $2.00 it splits. Everyone who owns the stock doubles the number of shares owned and the stock goes back to being worth $1.00. If a stock falls to being worth nothing all players lose their investment in that stock and must return their shares to the bank. The stock is then reset at $1.00.

After a set number of rolls, all players are able to buy and sell stocks concurrently at the prices established.

== Strategy ==
There are two basic strategies to making money at the game. The first is to buy whichever stocks are safely in dividend-paying territory. Using this method, if a stock splits and returns to the $1.00 value, the owner should sell out and reinvest in a stock that is safely above par. Similarly, if a stock drops below a dollar, the owner should sell the shares. This technique relies upon the rule that any money invested in a stock paying dividends will earn a greater return than shares that are not paying dividends.

The second strategy is more risky, but can also be immensely profitable. It involves buying stocks when they are near the bottom of the board and at risk of being worth nothing. Since the dice-rolling system moves stocks by a fixed amount, rather than a percentage of their value, these stocks are very volatile. One thousand dollars will buy ten thousand shares of a ten-cent stock. While this stock could move down by ten or twenty and be wiped out, the most one would lose is a thousand dollars. However, there is an equal chance that the stock will move up, and a single roll of Up 20 will triple the original investment. The possible return on investing in a five-cent stock, the cheapest possible, is even higher.

== See also ==
- Volatility (finance)
