= Lizzie Magie =

American board game designer (1866–1948)

Elizabeth Magie
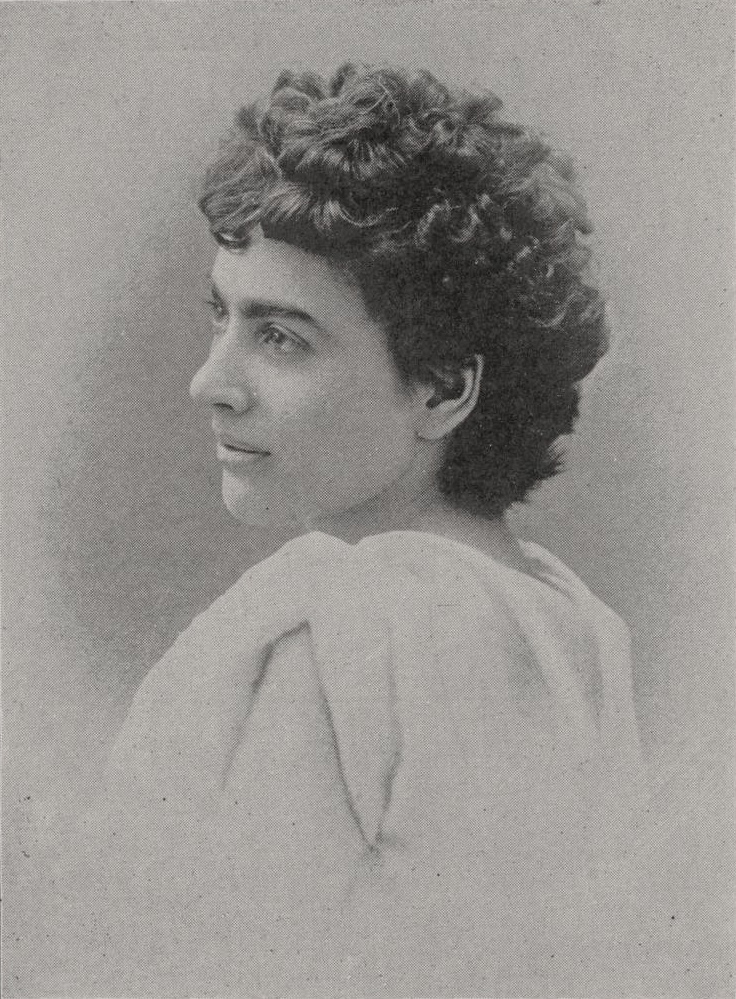
- Magie in 1892
- Born: Elizabeth J. Magie; May 9, 1866; Macomb, Illinois, U.S.
- Died: March 2, 1948 (aged 81); Arlington, Virginia, U.S.
- Resting place: Columbia Gardens Cemetery; Arlington, Virginia, U.S.
- Other name: Elizabeth J. Magie Phillips
- Occupations: Game designer; writer; feminist; Georgist
- Spouse: Albert Phillips (m. 1910; died 1937)

Elizabeth J. Magie Phillips (née Magie; May 9, 1866 – March 2, 1948) was an American game designer, writer, feminist, and Georgist. She invented The Landlord's Game, the precursor to Monopoly, to illustrate teachings of the progressive era economist Henry George.

== Life and career ==
Elizabeth J. Magie was born in Macomb, Illinois, in 1866 to Mary Jane (née Ritchie) and James K. Magie, a newspaper publisher and an abolitionist who accompanied Abraham Lincoln as he traveled around Illinois in the late 1850s debating politics with Stephen Douglas.

After moving to the D.C. and Maryland area in the early 1880s, she worked as a stenographer and typist at the Dead Letter Office. She was also a short story writer, poetry writer, comedian, stage actress, feminist, and engineer.

At the age of 26, Magie received a patent for her invention that made the typewriting process easier by allowing paper to go through the rollers more easily. At the time, women were credited with less than one percent of all patents. She also worked as a news reporter for a brief time in the early 1900s. In 1910, at age 44, she married Albert Wallace Phillips. They had no children.

== Political activism ==
Magie was an outspoken activist for the feminist movement, and Georgism, which reflected her father's political beliefs when she was young. Georgism refers to the economic perspective that instead of taxing income or other sources, the government should create a universal land tax based on the usefulness, size, and location of the land (Single tax). Then, after funding the government, the left over money would be distributed to the people. Many progressive political leaders at the time supported this economic perspective as it motivated people to cultivate land, redistributed wealth to people of low socioeconomic standing, eradicated the idea that landowners or landlords held the power and monetary value of the land that citizens used, and let people own all of the value and benefits of their creations. This belief became the basis for her game known as The Landlord's Game.

In order to bring the struggles of women in the United States to the public's attention, she bought an advertisement and tried to auction herself off as a "young woman American slave" looking for a husband to own her. This advertisement was meant to show the position of women and black people in the country, emphasizing the fact that the only people that were truly free were white men. The ad that Magie published became the talk of the town. It spread rapidly through the news and gossip columns around the country. Magie made a name for herself as an outspoken and proud feminist.

== The Landlord's Game ==
Magie first made her game, known as The Landlord's Game, popular among friends while living in Brentwood, Maryland. In 1903, Magie applied to the U.S. Patent Office for a patent on her board game. She was granted U.S. Patent 748,626 on January 5, 1904. Magie received her patent before women in the United States had the right to vote nationally.

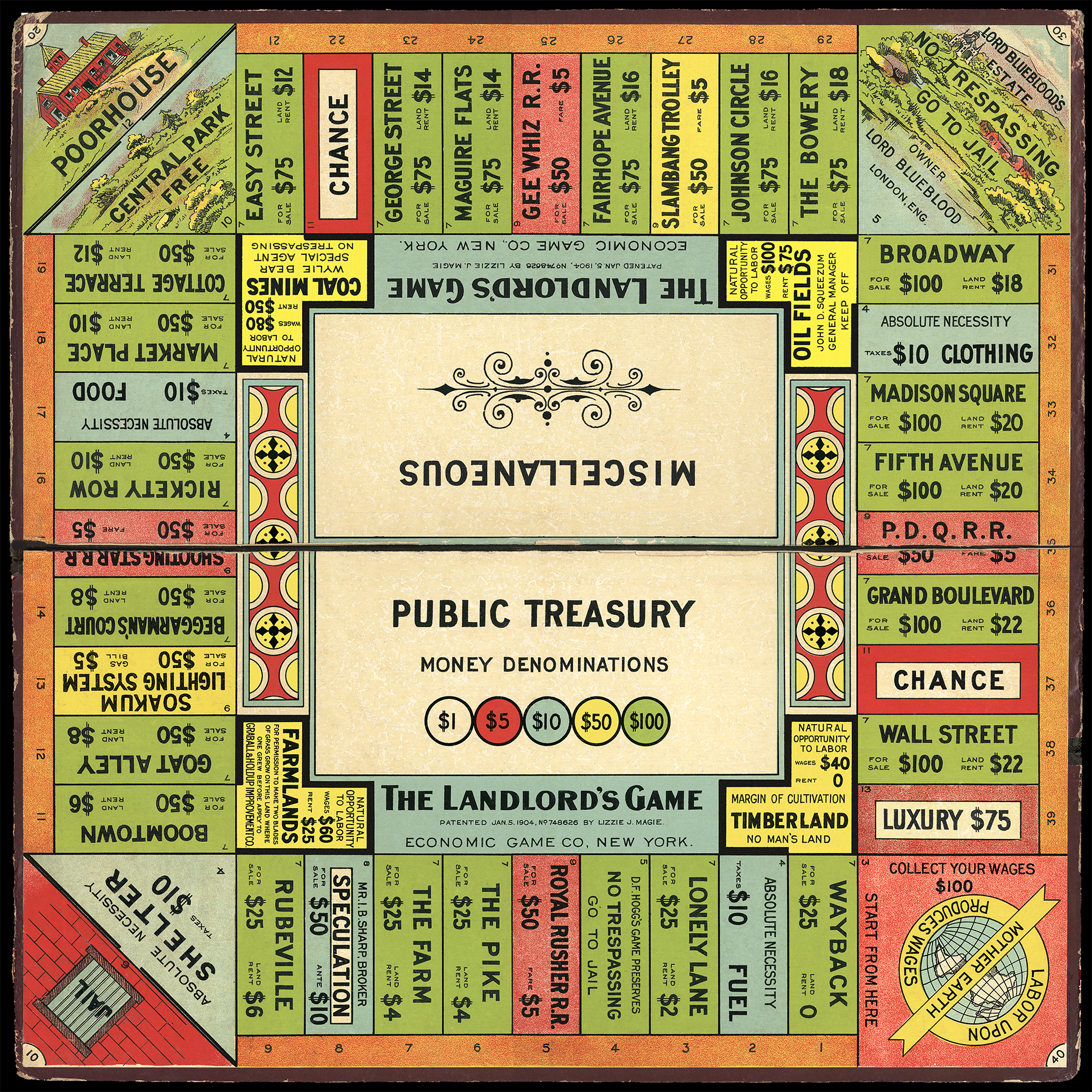
The Landlord's Game board, published in 1906

The Landlord's Game was designed to demonstrate the economic ill effects of land monopolism and the use of land value tax as a remedy for it. Originally, the goal of the game was to simply obtain wealth. In the following patents, the game developed to eventually have two different settings: one being the monopolist set up (known as Monopoly) where the goal was to own industries, create monopolies, and win by forcing others out of their industries and the other being the anti-monopolist setup (known as Prosperity) where the goal was to create products and interact with opponents. The game would later go on to be the inspiration for the game Monopoly.

In 1906, she moved to Chicago. That year, she and fellow Georgists formed the Economic Game Co. to self-publish her original edition of The Landlord's Game. In 1910, the Parker Brothers published her humorous card game Mock Trial. Then, the Newbie Game Co. in Scotland patented The Landlord's Game as "Bre'r Fox and Bre'r Rabbit;". However, there was no proof that the game was actually protected by the British patent.

She and her husband moved back to the east coast of the U.S. and patented a revised version of the game in 1924. As her original patent had expired in 1921, this is seen as her attempt to reassert control over her game, which was now being played at some colleges where students made their own copies. In 1932, her second edition of The Landlord's Game was published by the Adgame Company of Washington, D.C. This version included both Monopoly and Prosperity.

Magie also developed other games including Bargain Day and King's Men in 1937 and a third version of The Landlord's Game in 1939. In Bargain Day, shoppers compete with each other in a department store; King's Men is an abstract strategy game.

== Death ==
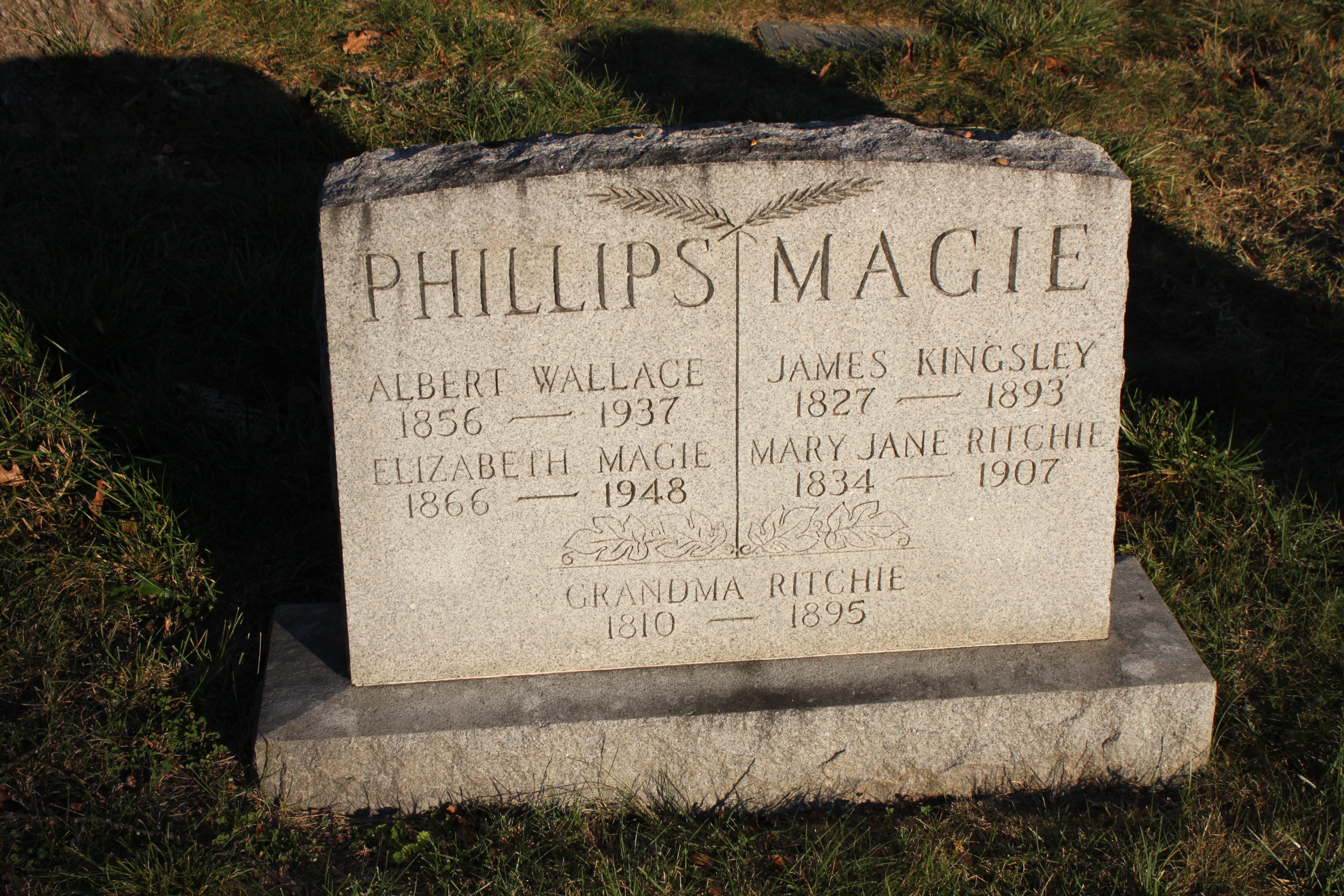
Grave of Magie and her husband at Columbia Gardens Cemetery

Magie died at the age of 81 in 1948. She was buried with her husband Albert Wallace Phillips, who had died in 1937, in Columbia Gardens Cemetery, Arlington, Virginia. They had no children. At her death, she was not credited for the effect that she had had on the board game community and American culture.

== Monopoly ==
The Monopoly board game, which Lizzie Magie claimed was similar to her patent, The Landlord's Game

Magie's game was becoming increasingly popular around the Northeastern United States. College students attending Harvard, Columbia, and University of Pennsylvania, left-leaning middle-class families, and Quakers were all playing her board game. Three decades after The Landlord's Game was invented in 1904, Parker Brothers published a modified version, known as Monopoly. Charles Darrow claimed the idea as his own, stating that he invented the game in his basement. Magie later spoke out against them and reported that she had made a mere $500 from her invention and received none of the credit for Monopoly.

In January 1936, an interview with Magie appeared in a Washington, D.C. newspaper, in which she was critical of Parker Brothers. Magie spoke to reporters about the similarities between Monopoly and The Landlord's Game. The article published spoke to the fact that Magie spent more money making her game than she received in earnings, especially with the lack of credit she received after Monopoly was created. After the interviews, Parker Brothers agreed to publish two more of her games but continued to give Darrow the credit for inventing the game itself.

Darrow was known as the inventor of Monopoly until Ralph Anspach, creator of the Anti-Monopoly game, discovered Magie's patents. Anspach had researched the history of Monopoly in relation to a legal struggle against Parker Brothers regarding his own game, and discovered Darrow's decision to take credit for its invention, despite his having learned about it through friends. Subsequently, Magie's invention of The Landlord's Game has been given more attention and research. Despite the fact that Darrow and Parker Brothers capitalized on and were credited with her idea, she has posthumously received credit for one of the most popular board games.

== Legacy ==
After her death, the impact Magie had on many aspects of American culture and life began to be appreciated. She helped to popularize the circular board game. Most board games at the time were linear; a circular board game that concentrated on interacting both socially and competitively with the opponents was a novel idea. Her board game not only laid the foundation and inspiration for Monopoly, the most famous board game in the United States, but also provided entertainment that taught about Georgist principles, the value in spreading wealth, and the harmfulness of monopolies. This aspect of her game was absent from the Darrow version of Monopoly.

She also contributed to the women's movement and black people's rights, through educating others about these concepts, inventing board games at a time when women held less than one percent of US patents, and publishing political material in newspapers to speak out against the oppression of women and black communities in the United States.
