= Finance (game) =

Board game based on The Landlord's Game

Finance and Fortune
The Great Game (1935 FGC); House and Lot (1936 PB); Parker Brothers Business Trading Game (1958); Parker Brothers Junior Business Trading Game (1962)
- Other names: The Fascinating Game of Finance; Finance
- Manufacturers: L. S. Ayres & Co. Electronic Laboratories, Inc.
- Designers: Elizabeth Magie; Louis & Fred Thun; Dan Layman
- Publishers: Dan Layman; Knapp Electric; Finance Game Company/; Parker Brothers
- Publication: 1932; 93 years ago
- Years active: 1932–1970s
- Players: 2–6
- Setup time: 5'–15'
- Playing time: 120'
- Chance: High (dice rolling, card drawing)
- Skills: Negotiation, Resource management

Finance, or The Fascinating Game of Finance or Finance and Fortune, is a board game originally released in 1932. The game is based on The Landlord's Game in the movement of pieces around the board, the use of cards, properties that can be purchased, and houses that can be erected on them. The game also has railroads; however, these may not be purchased. The game is a predecessor to Monopoly.

== History ==
=== Finance ===
Finance was created by Dan Layman who played, with Louis, Louis and Fred Thun's version of the auction-monopoly games that had been spawned from The Landlord's Game at Williams College in Reading, Pennsylvania. When the Thuns wanted to patent their game they found the Landlord's Game patent and only copyrighted their rule additions (additional railroads own double rent, Community Chest, paying $50 to get out of jail). With the Monopoly name and game then in the public domain, Layman decided to call the game Finance. With L. S. Ayres & Co. then Electronics Laboratories, Layman published the game for a year before selling it to Knapp Electric for $200. Initially, the game was sold in small black boxes (some of which came with poker chips for money) with four different versions of the rules. Otherwise, it was almost identical to Monopoly including Chance and Community Chest cards.

It is said that Layman taught Ruth Hoskins, who moved to Atlantic City and played it there using local Atlantic City streets. One theory on the street names chosen is that these were the streets players lived on with a couple of later changes of South Carolina to North Carolina and Arctic to Mediterranean. Pete Daggett Jr., a friend of Dan Layman, actually taught Ruth Hoskins. Hoskins then moved to Atlantic City to teach school in 1932 and created the Atlantic City version in the late 1930s with her friends. Eugene and Ruth Raiford, friends of Hoskins, showed the game to Charles E. Todd, a hotel manager in Germantown, Pennsylvania. Todd introduced Charles and Esther Darrow to the game. The Darrows were occasional hotel guests; Esther was Todd's former neighbor.

With Parker Brothers taking over for Darrow in publishing his Monopoly game in 1935, Parker Brothers purchased Finance from Knapp for $10,000. Parker Brothers changed Finance so it was less similar to Monopoly and published it under the Finance Game Company name in 1935. Parker Brothers made additional changes in 1936 and published it with the Parker Brothers name.

=== Fortune ===
During 1935, Parker Brothers was developing its own version of Monopoly, Fortune, in case its deal with Darrow and the patent fell through. Almost an exact copy of Monopoly, Fortune had only 10,000 copies made due to the deal with Darrow working out and was only published to keep the trademark to the name. Also in 1935, Finance outsold Monopoly.

=== Finance and Fortune ===
With Parker Brothers wishing to hold on to the trademark on Fortune, the second version of Finance by Parker Brothers was named Finance and Fortune. With its 1958 edition, the game's name reverted to Finance as they developed a new marble game having the "Fortune" name. The last known version was printed in 1962.

== Known changes ==
Known changes between the original and the Parker Brother editions:

- removed Community Chest
- dropped colored property groups
- Rent chart card replaced the Property Cards
- colored standard pawns changed to colored different shaped pawns
- properties renamed
- property purchase prices increased

== Overview of game ==
The game begins with each player on "Cash Here" with $1925. Properties clockwise around the board begin with low value to high value purchase prices, with costs for additional houses and rents also increasing. Players move again on doubles, with no limit on numbers of doubles that may be thrown, and if a player lands on another player, the original player moves back five spaces, with the same effect as if the player had landed on that space originally. Players may trade properties or sell them back to the bank, but may not mortgage property. If a player is unable to pay, all their property is returned to the bank, and the player is out. The game continues until only one player is left. An alternate rule establishes a time limit and players total up their wealth.

== Reviews ==
- The Playboy Winner's Guide to Board Games
