= The Landlord's Game =

1904 board game and precursor to Monopoly

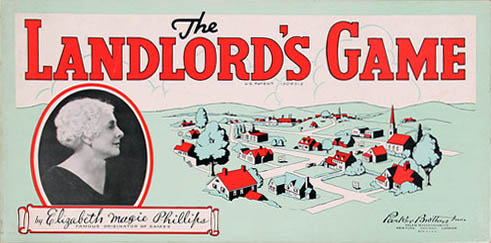
- Cover of the game, displaying creator Elizabeth Magie
- Other names: Landlord's Game and Prosperity; Brer Fox an' Brer Rabbit (UK); Carnival; Das Original: Anno 1904 (de)
- Designers: Elizabeth Magie
- Publishers: Economic Game Company; Adgame Company (Inc.); Newbie Game Company (UK); Parker Brothers; ASS Altenburger Spielkarten (de)
- Years active: 1906–1939
- Genres: property
- Languages: English, German
- Players: 2–4
- Synonyms: Monopoly; Finance; Auction

The Landlord's Game is a board game patented in 1904 by Elizabeth Magie as U.S. patent 748,626. A realty and taxation game intended to educate users about Georgism, it is the inspiration for the 1935 board game Monopoly.

== History ==
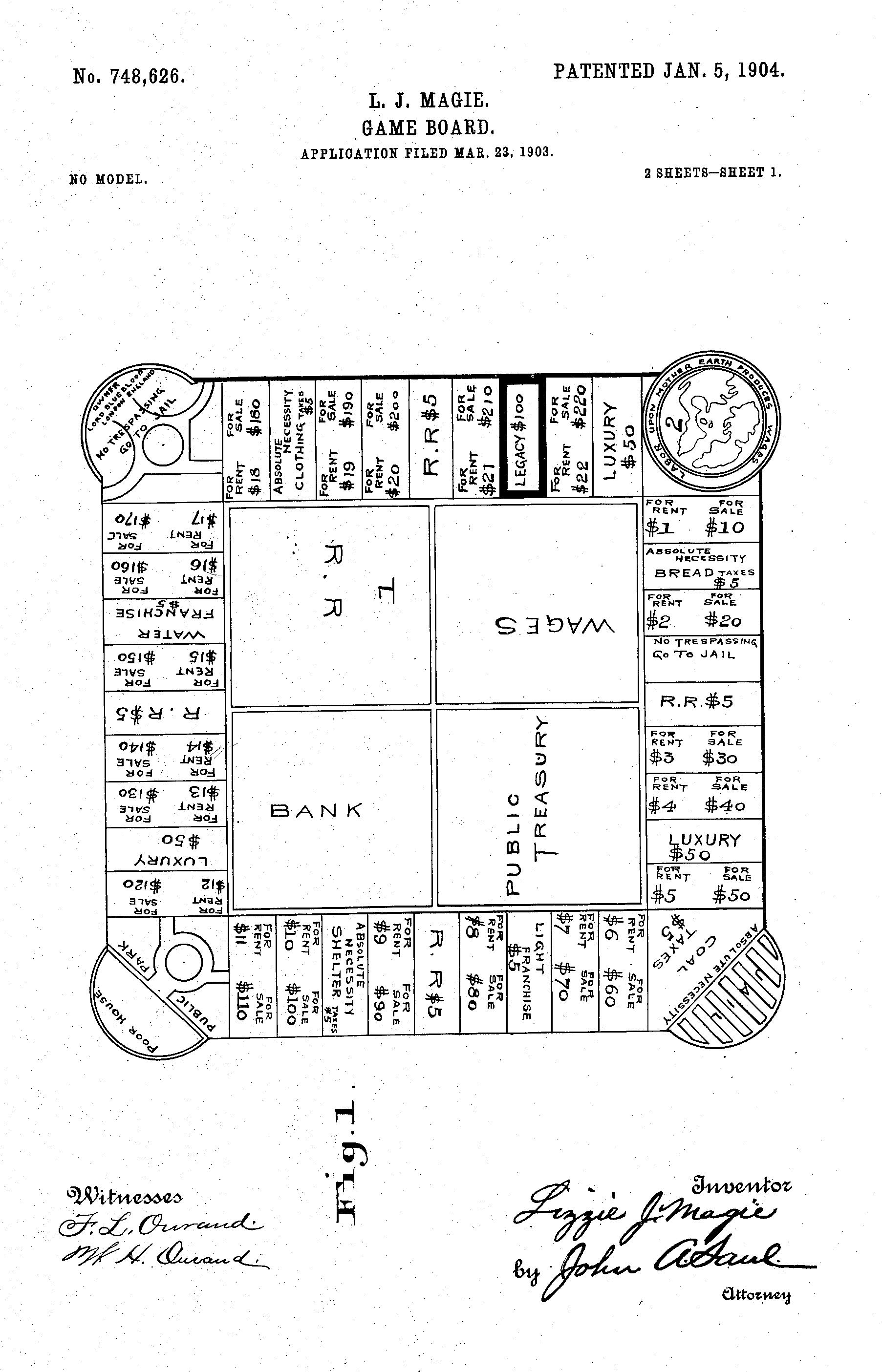
The first patent drawing for Lizzie Magie's board game, dated January 5, 1904

In 1902 to 1903, Magie designed the game and playtested it in Arden, Delaware. The game was created to be a "practical demonstration of the present system of land grabbing with all its usual outcomes and consequences". She based the game on the economic principles of Georgism, a system proposed by Henry George, with the object of demonstrating how rents enrich property owners and impoverish tenants. She knew that some people could find it hard to understand why this happened and what might be done about it, and she thought that if Georgist ideas were put into the concrete form of a game, they might be easier to demonstrate. Magie also hoped that when played by children the game would provoke their natural suspicion of unfairness, and that they might carry this awareness into adulthood. The Landlord's Game has some similarities to the basic rules of the board game Zohn Ahl, played by the Kiowa Indians of North America. There are hints that suggest Elizabeth Magie might have known Zohn Ahl and incorporated some of the game's ideas.

First page of patent submission for second version of Lizzie Magie's board game, submitted in 1923 and granted in 1924

In 1903, Magie filed for a patent on the game which was granted in 1904. Magie and fellow Georgists formed a company, Economic Game Company, in 1906 New York to publish the game. Besides Magie, the incorporators were E. H. Monroe of Chicago and E. G. Lenbusher of New York. Magie approached Parker Brothers to publish this and one other game in 1909. The other game was accepted while Landlord's was rejected as too complicated.

In the United Kingdom The Landlord's Game was first published in 1913 by the Newbie Game Company, formed by a Liberal Committee from the village of Newbie in Dumfries, under the title Brer Fox an' Brer Rabbit; despite the title change, it was recognizably the same game. Landlord sold well in the northeastern United States amongst its left-wing intellectuals, while Brer was unsuccessful.

Scott Nearing, socialist professor of economics at Wharton School of Finance from 1906 to 1915, lived in Arden in 1910, where Magie invented the game, learned about the game and taught it to his students. College students made up their own boards to use with her rules. Various versions of the game popped up over the following years under a variety of names, Monopoly, Finance, and Auction being among them. Among the Atlantic City and Philadelphia communities of Quakers, the game was particularly popular with college students and economics professors. Jesse and Eugene Raiford, Quakers in Atlantic City, used household items instead of pawns and changed the properties' names to match well-known places in Atlantic City.

With Magie's first patent having expired, in 1923 she decided to attempt to regain control of marketing the game by applying for another patent. On September 23, 1924, a second patent was issued to Magie for The Landlord's Game. Adgame Company (Inc.) published Landlord's Game and Prosperity under this patent in 1932.

Robert Baron had Parker Brothers design its own version, called Fortune, before they began negotiating to purchase Magie's patents, in case the discussion fell apart or she sold to another potential buyer, Dave Knapp, publisher of Finance. Magie held her 1923 patent until 1935, when she sold it to Parker Brothers for $500, equivalent to $11,742 in 2025. The company had recently started distributing Monopoly, which it had purchased from Charles Darrow who claimed to have invented it. Parker Brothers only printed a very small run of The Landlord's Game to secure their claim to the rights. Surviving copies of The Landlord's Game manufactured by Parker Brothers are considered by many the rarest of all 20th century board games. Parker Brothers pushed her game aside for Darrow's by 1936. Magie then did two interviews showcasing copies of the original board, with The Washington Post and The Evening Star, to show that Darrow was not the inventor of the game.

In 1937, Carnival was published based on the 1904 version. Parker Brothers published their edition of the game in 1939.

In a 2004 episode of PBS' History Detectives (title: "Monopoly; Japanese Internment Camp Artwork; The Lewis and Clark Cane"), the show investigated a game board belonging to a Delaware man, having an intermediate version of a game combining elements of The Landlord's Game and Monopoly. The investigators concluded that this game board was the missing link that proves that Monopoly was derived from The Landlord's Game.

The connection between The Landlord's Game and Monopoly is discussed in the 2024 horror film Heretic.

== Description ==
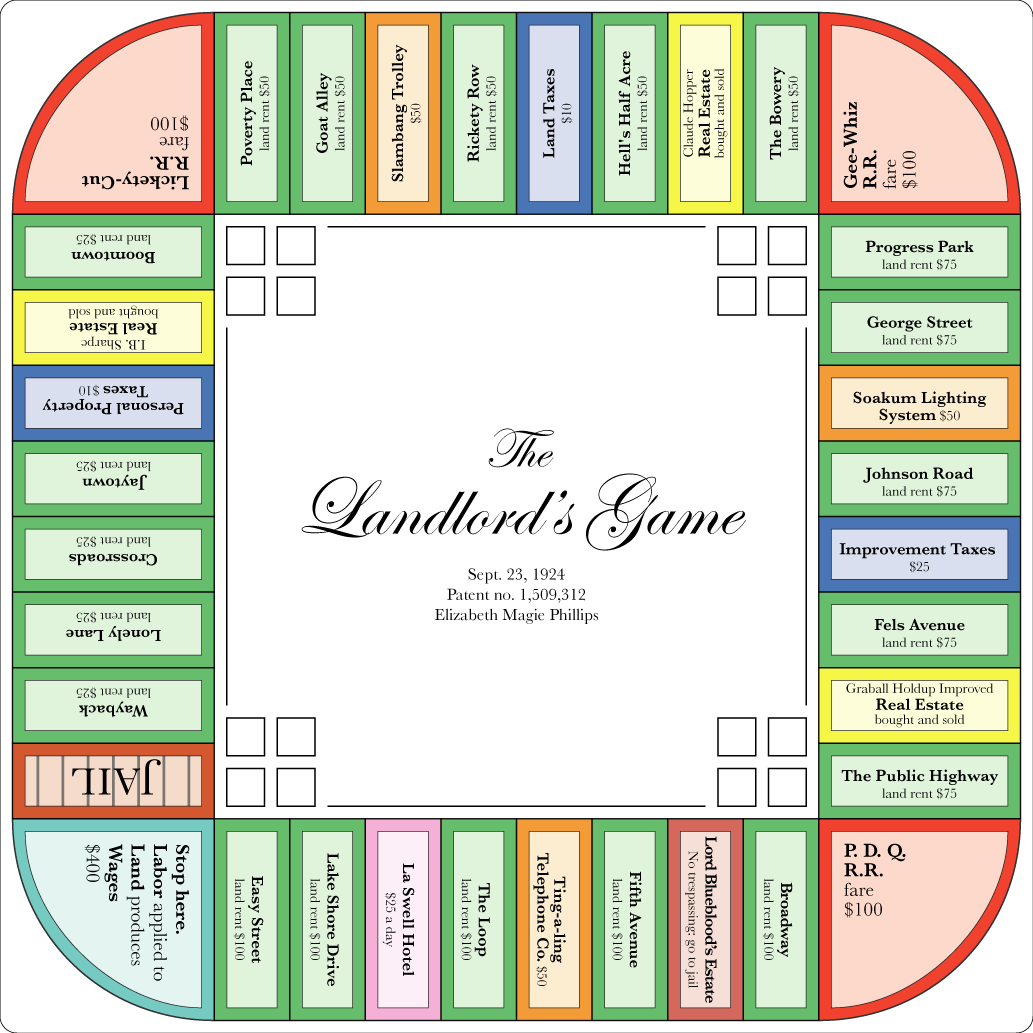
Landlord's Game board, based on Magie's 1924 US patent (no. 1,509,312)

The set had rules for two different games, anti-monopolist and monopolist. The anti-monopolist rules reward all players during wealth creation, whereas the monopolist rules incentivize forming monopolies and forcing opponents out of the game. In the anti-monopolist or single-tax version (later called "Prosperity"), the game is won when the player with the least money doubles their original stake.

The board featured a track around the outside edge of the board split into blocks representing properties and had their purchase price, and their rental value listed in the block. New York City's Broadway, Fifth Avenue, and Wall Street were the top properties in price and rent. The published game included Chance cards with quotes attributed to Thomas Jefferson, John Ruskin and Andrew Carnegie.

For the published 1906 version, minor changes were made to what had been described in the 1904 patent: the property names were changed, and the rule regarding increased rent for multiple railroads owned was added.

== Patents ==
The game's first patent was the first issued for a game while claiming four features in the application, the most important feature was a continuous path game. At the time, most games had a start and end spot. With the first patent having expired in 1921, Magie applied for another patent with five new claims.

The claims of Magie's second patent could not include those of the first (now in the public domain) and leaned more towards the single tax theory of play. One common misconception is that Parker Brothers acquired the rights to Magie's original invention of Monopoly play and the unique design by purchasing the later 1924 patent. Parker Brothers acquired Magie's patent to The Landlord's Game but although both patents had the same name they covered different claims. The substitution or confusion of the early patent for the latter is still commonplace.

== See also ==
- Ralph Anspach's Anti-Monopoly
- Bertell Ollman's Class Struggle
