= Google LLC v Commission =

Google and Alphabet v Commission (Google Android)
- Court: General Court
- Full case name: Google LLC and Alphabet, Inc. v European Commission
- Decided: 14 September 2022
- Citation: (2022) T-604/18
- ECLI: ECLI:EU:T:2022:541

Case history
- Prior action: Commission Decision of 18 July 2018, C(2018) 4761 final
- Appealed to: European Court of Justice

Ruling
- Commission's decision largely upheld, fine partially annulled

Keywords
- competition, abuse of dominant position, product bundles, exclusivity payments

Google and Alphabet v Commission (2022; T-604/18), commonly referred to as the Google Android case, is a European Union competition law case concerning the conducts of Google relating to the Android operating system. Google was accused of abusing its dominant position in the mobile operating system and Android app store markets by tying its own applications to the licensing of the Google Play Store.

== Context ==
Android is an operating system designed primarily for mobile devices, such as smartphones and tablet computers. The core Android software is developed by Google and made available as open-source software through the Android Open Source Project (AOSP). Unlike operating systems such as iOS or BlackBerry OS that were available only on the developer's own hardware, Android is available for multiple device manufacturers. The first Android smartphones were commercially released in 2008, and by 2013, Android has gained almost 80 percent of the worldwide market share for smartphone operating systems.

While the open-source licence of AOSP allows hardware manufacturers to create a non-Google version of Android (a "fork") from the core software (for example, Amazon Fire OS), most Android-based devices sold outside of mainland China use Google's version and also incorporate Google's proprietary components that need to be licensed from Google. Such components include the Google Play app store and other Google's own applications (Google Mobile Services), as well as the application programming interface for maps and push notifications. Device manufacturers who joined the Google-led Open Handset Alliance had to sign a "non-fragmentation agreement", prohibiting them from shipping devices with a non-Google Android fork.

Google's licensing requirements were also investigated by competition authorities in other jurisdictions outside the EU. Following a complaint from a competing search engine Yandex, Russia's Federal Antimonopoly Service issued a decision in September 2015 that Google violated the competition law by distributing the Google Play app store only as part of the Google Mobile Services suite and requiring manufacturers to set Google as the default search engine.

== Commission's proceeding against Google ==
The European Commission's actions to investigate Google's approach to the Android operating system was predicated on several complaints it had received. The first complaint was lodged by FairSearch. FairSearch was established in 2010 as a coalition of travel-related web companies including Expedia and TripAdvisor to try to fight against Google's proposed acquisition of ITA, which had developed airfare search software. The group shifted towards becoming more of a Google watchdog group, looking at all instances of Google's activities which they considered were potentially anti-competition. Companies like Microsoft, Nokia, and Oracle joined the group to support this broader effort. Prior to their attention to the Android system, FairSearch issued complaints to the EC over how Google's search engines would preferentially weigh results from Google's own services or its partners over others, as part of antitrust investigations conducted by the EU since 2010. On 25 March 2013, the European branch of FairSearch filed a formal complaint to the EU, who were still investigating Google from previous complaints, citing that Google's practices with Android violated various EU's antitrust laws. The complaint identified that Google required any original equipment manufacturer (OEM) wanting to install Google's suite of Android apps, including access to the Google Play Store, had to license the entire suite and feature them predominately on the mobile device.

A second complaint was filed by Aptoide on 16 June 2014, an alternative marketplace for Android apps. Aptoide asserted that Google's approach to Android made it difficult for alternatives to the Google Play store to be installed, and that some of the components that were once part of Google's Android Open Source Project were moved into the Google Mobile Services suite, including Gmail, Google Maps, and the Play Store. Further complaints were lodged by Yandex and Disconnect Inc. in April and June 2015.

The European Commission announced in April 2015 that it initiated a formal antitrust proceeding against Google in relation to the Android operating system. In July 2018, the Commission imposed a €4.34 billion fine on Google for abusing its dominance according to the Article 102 of the Treaty on the Functioning of the European Union. In the decision, the Commission considered the following conducts anti-competitive:

- Google required device manufacturers to pre-install Google Search and Google Chrome browser applications in order to license Google Play Store.
- Google paid manufacturers and network operators to exclusively pre-install the Google Search application on the devices.
- Google prevented device manufacturers who wish to license Google's applications from selling devices that use a competing forked version of Android.

== Judgment ==
=== General Court ===
In October 2018, Google challenged the Commission's decision before the General Court. In September 2022, the Court upheld the Commission's decision overall, although the fine was reduced to €4.125 billion.

In July 2026, the European Court of Justice upheld the decision of the General Court, dismissing the appeal by Google and Alphabet.

== See also ==
- Antitrust cases against Google by the European Union
- United States v. Google LLC (2020)
