= Mr. Monopoly =

Mascot for the board game Monopoly

- A person dressed in a Mr. Monopoly suit at Comic Con 2025, holding his signature cane
- First appearance: 1936
- Designed by: Daniel Fox

In-universe information
- Aliases: "Rich Uncle" Pennybags, Milburn Pennybags
- Gender: Male

Mr. Monopoly is the fictional mascot of the board game Monopoly. He is depicted as an old man with a moustache who wears a morning suit with a bowtie and top hat. In some game material he is known as "Rich Uncle" Pennybags or Milburn Pennybags. He also appears in the related games Rich Uncle, Advance to Boardwalk, Free Parking, Don't Go to Jail, Monopoly City, Monopoly Junior, Monopoly Deal, and Monopoly Go!.

The character first appeared on Chance and Community Chest cards in U.S. editions of Monopoly in 1936. The identity of the character's designer, artist Daniel Fox, had been publicly forgotten until 2013, when a former Parker Brothers executive, Philip Orbanes, was contacted by one of Fox's grandchildren.

== History ==
The first edition of the Parker Brothers game Rich Uncle

The unnamed character made his first appearance outside Monopoly in the Parker Brothers' game Dig, released in 1940. He did not receive a name until 1946, when Parker Brothers produced the game Rich Uncle, where his likeness appeared on the box lid, instructions, and currency. According to Orbanes, the character in the American version of Monopoly is modeled after American Progressive Era businessman J. P. Morgan.

A more contemporary depiction of Pennybags on the box of Monopoly

Between 1985 and 2008, the character appeared in the second "O" in the word Monopoly as part of the game's logo. More recently, he is depicted over the word "Monopoly", drawn in a 3-D style, extending his right hand. However, he no longer appears uniformly on every Monopoly game box.

In 1988, Orbanes published the first edition of his book The Monopoly Companion, sections of which are presented as rare interviews with the mascot character. Orbanes refers to him as "Milburn Pennybags" and "The Rich Uncle", and some of the other characters that appear on the Monopoly board or within the decks of cards are also given names: the character "In Jail" is named Jake the Jailbird, and the police officer on Go to Jail is Edgar Mallory. (In the 1999 second edition of book, the character is instead referred to as "Mr. Monopoly".)

The 1990 Monopoly Jr. board game names its "free parking" square as "Uncle Pennybags' Loose Change".

In 1999, Parker Brothers renamed the character from Rich Uncle Pennybags to Mr. Monopoly. That same year, a Monopoly Jr. CD-ROM game was released in cereal boxes as part of a General Mills promotion. It introduced Mr. Monopoly's niece and nephew, Sandy and Andy.

According to the book, Monopoly: The World's Most Famous Game & How It Got That Way and The Monopoly Companion, Mr. Monopoly has a second nephew named Randy, although the Monopoly Companion refers to Sandy as a boy. Monopoly: The World's Most Famous Game & How It Got That Way also states that Mr. Monopoly has a wife named Madge. He is named as the sixth richest fictional character in the 2006 Forbes Fictional 15 list on its Web site and the ninth richest in 2011.

== Legacy ==
In 2017, a staff member of the activist group Public Citizen who dressed as Mr. Monopoly with an added monocle gained Internet and media attention by photobombing the CEO of Equifax during a US Senate hearing relating to that credit bureau's data security breach from earlier that same year. It was an attempt to bring attention to the use of "forced arbitration" to circumvent consumers' rights to sue financial companies in court.

While Google CEO Sundar Pichai testified before Congress on December 11, 2018, a person costumed in a white mustache and black bowler hat as the Monopoly Man was among those seated behind him.

On September 12, 2023, Ian Madrigal again dressed as the Monopoly Man following Kent Walker, the President of Global Affairs at Alphabet Inc., to Google's antitrust trial United States v. Google LLC (2023) at federal court in Washington, D.C.

Clue: Candlestick, a mystery comic book by Dash Shaw based on the board game Clue, features Rich Uncle Pennybags in a cameo. He is referred to as "Milburn".

Vault Boy, the mascot of the Fallout video game series, is based partly on Rich Uncle Pennybags.

Mr. Monopoly is also the subject of an instance of the Mandela effect – the phenomenon of shared false memories – where he is allegedly depicted as wearing a monocle, which he did not do until after this false memory gained traction. The Mandela effect gained recognition in 2009 when Fiona Broome discovered a similar memory about Nelson Mandela's death. Prior to that there are many examples, such as a scene in Ace Ventura: When Nature Calls, released in 1995, in which the character played by Jim Carrey meets a man with a monocle and mustache and refers to him as "the Monopoly guy".

== Voices ==
In licensed media, primarily including advertisements and video games, Mr. Monopoly has been voiced by several voice actors including Tony Waldman, Tony Pope, Wendell Johnson, Dean Hagopian, Larry Moran, Michael Cornacchia, Harry Aspinwall, Paul J. Kinney, Rowell Gormon, Richard Rapp, and Will Ferrell.
