= United States v. Apple (2024) =

2024 American court case

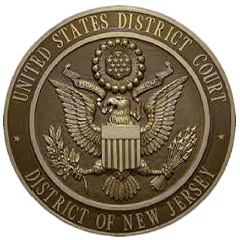
- Court: United States District Court for the District of New Jersey
- Full case name: United States of America, State of New Jersey, State of Arizona, State of California, District of Columbia, State of Connecticut, State of Maine, State of Michigan, State of Minnesota, State of New Hampshire, State of New York, State of North Dakota, State of Oklahoma, State of Oregon, State of Tennessee, State of Vermont, and State of Wisconsin v. Apple Inc.

Court membership
- Judge sitting: Julien Neals

United States, et al. v. Apple Inc. is a lawsuit brought against multinational technology corporation Apple in 2024. The United States Department of Justice (DOJ) alleges that Apple violated antitrust statutes. The lawsuit contrasts the practices of Apple with those of Microsoft in United States v. Microsoft Corp., and alleges that Apple is engaging in similar tactics and committing even more egregious violations. This lawsuit comes in the wake of Epic Games v. Apple and the enforcement of the Digital Markets Act in the European Union.

== Background ==
=== Antitrust lawsuits ===
Beginning in the 2010s, concerns surrounding the market power of the "Big Tech" companies (Amazon, Meta Platforms, and Google) began to mount in the United States. The DOJ had previously sued Apple on two occasions: on e-book prices and over alleged collusion to depress employee salaries with other tech companies.

In 2020, the Democratic majority staff of the House Judiciary Subcommittee on Antitrust, Commercial and Administrative Law released a report accusing Apple and other Big Tech companies of unlawfully wielding monopoly power. The filing of United States v. Apple followed the launch of federal antitrust suits against Google (2020 and 2023), Meta (2020), and Amazon (2023).

In 2020, Epic Games launched an antitrust lawsuit against Apple that challenged the company's practice of preventing apps on the App Store from offering alternative in-app purchase options.

=== Department of Justice investigation ===
In June 2019, Reuters reported that the Federal Trade Commission agreed to give the Department of Justice jurisdiction in investigating Apple. Then-attorney general William Barr stated in December that he intended to file a lawsuit against Apple the following year. The Department of Justice contacted several developers, including the chief executive of the parental control service Mobicip, Suren Ramasubbu; Mobicip was removed from the App Store in June 2018, after the company announced a screen time feature with parental controls in iOS 12.

== District Court case ==
In a press conference, the US Attorney General Merrick Garland made reference to the 30% "Apple Tax", criticized iMessage's "Green Bubbles", and called out the lack of NFC access for 3rd party banking apps. According to the documents filed by the Attorneys General, the key categories of Apple artificially restricting competition were:

- "Super" Apps: hindering the usage of multi-functionality apps like those seen in China and South Korea, WeChat and KakaoTalk especially.
- Messaging Apps: by labelling different devices in a certain color in iMessage (the 'green bubble') discourages switching to a different device.
- Cloud Streaming Apps: restricting the selection of games on game streaming platforms (in a similar manner to the restriction of content viz a viz alternate app stores, sideloading and alternate payment interfaces)
- Digital Wallets: by heavily restricting access to the NFC API and affording to itself the privilege of host-card emulation via Apple Wallet.
- Cross-platform smartwatches: by overly encumbering the usage of Apple Watches with other (non-apple) devices and Wear OS watches on their own devices.

Assistant Attorney General Jonathan Kanter stated United States v. Microsoft Corp. "paved the way for Apple to launch iTunes, iPod and eventually the iPhone", and that this new suit will “protect competition and innovation for the next generation of technology.”

The case was initially set to be overseen by judge Michael E. Farbiarz until he recused himself on April 10, 2024. Judge Julien Neals became the sitting judge on the case in his absence.

On August 1, 2024, Apple filed a motion to dismiss the case. Judge Neals denied the motion a year later on June 30.

== See also ==
- Big Tech
