= United States v. Google LLC (2020) =

Antitrust case alleging domination of internet search

- Court: United States District Court for the District of Columbia
- Full case name: United States, State of Arkansas, State of Florida, State of Georgia, State of Indiana, Commonwealth of Kentucky, State of Louisiana, State of Mississippi, State of Missouri, State of Montana, State of South Carolina and State of Texas v. Google LLC
- Started: October 20, 2020
- Decided: August 5, 2024
- Defendant: Google LLC
- Counsel for plaintiff: Kenneth Dintzer
- Plaintiff: United States Department of Justice

Holding
- Google LLC violates Section 2 of the Sherman Act.

Court membership
- Judge sitting: Amit P. Mehta

United States v. Google LLC is an ongoing federal antitrust case brought by the United States Department of Justice (DOJ) against Google LLC, initiated on October 20, 2020. The suit alleges that Google has violated the Sherman Antitrust Act of 1890 by illegally monopolizing the search engine and search advertising markets, most notably on Android devices, as well as with Apple and mobile carriers.

The case was heard starting in September 2023 in the District Court for the District of Columbia with Judge Amit Mehta presiding. Mehta issued a ruling in August 2024, finding that Google held a monopoly on their search engine technology, and illegally used that dominance in securing its position with mobile device and website partners. Google immediately appealed that decision, and commentators expect the dispute to last for several years.

The lawsuit was initially described as a "blockbuster antitrust trial", and has been widely described as one of the most important federal antitrust lawsuit against a high-tech company since the United States v. Microsoft Corp. case in 1998. The outcome of the case will have a potential bearing on the subsequently-filed federal antitrust suits against fellow "Big Tech" companies Meta Platforms, Amazon, and Apple. The DOJ filed a second antitrust lawsuit against Google over the company's advertising market practices in 2023.

In September 2025, Mehta ruled that Google would not be required to divest of Chrome or Android, but would be barred from including search in exclusive contracts and required to share some data with competitors. Various portions of this ruling have been appealed by both the Department of Justice and Google, with the dispute still in progress as of early 2026.

== Background ==
The rapid growth of the U.S. tech industry in the 1990s led to concerns about the potential for anti-competitive behavior in the sector. This ultimately led to the federal government launching an antitrust suit against Microsoft, alleging that the company unfairly hindered competition. Google was the next Internet company to be suspected of monopolistic behavior.

=== Prior antitrust scrutiny of Google ===
In 2008, scrutiny by the U.S. Department of Justice (DOJ) and the Canadian Competition Bureau of an advertising deal between Google and Yahoo! led the companies to abandon their agreement. According to the DOJ, the "agreement between these two companies accounting for 90 percent or more of each relevant market" would have likely harmed "competition in the markets for Internet search advertising and Internet search syndication".

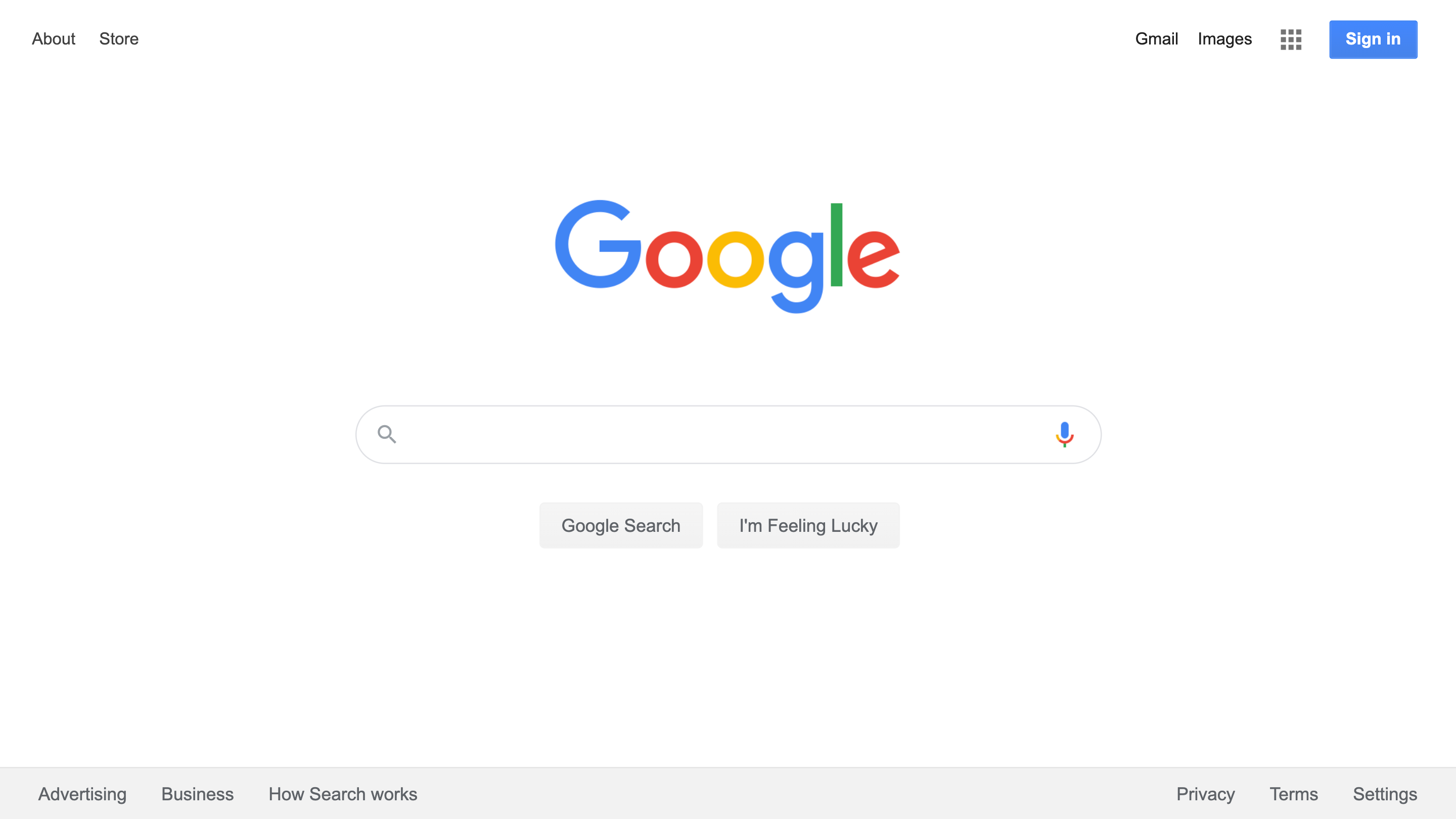
The DOJ lawsuit alleges that Google Search holds an unlawful monopoly in the search engine market.

In the 2010s, concerns about potential anti-competitive behavior by "Big Tech" (Google, Apple, Amazon, Meta) companies became subject to lawmaker scrutiny. In 2011, members of the Federal Trade Commission (FTC) voted to demand information from Google as part of an antitrust inquiry into the company's search engine practices. Following a nineteen-month investigation, FTC staff attorneys recommended that the agency bring forth an antitrust lawsuit against Google. However, the members of the commissioners ultimately declined this recommendation, and voted in January 2013, to close the investigation.

On October 6, 2020, the House Judiciary Subcommittee on Antitrust, Commercial and Administrative Law released a nearly 450-page report following a 16-month long investigation concluding that the companies wield "monopoly power". During the previous decade, the European Commission engaged in antitrust scrutiny of Google, leading to the company being found guilty of competition law breaches in three separate cases. The United States v. Google lawsuit has been specifically compared to the European Commission's lawsuit against Google's Android practices.

== Legal proceedings ==
=== Launch of lawsuit and initial response (2020) ===
The Department of Justice (DOJ) formally brought the case on October 20, 2020, in conjunction with state attorneys general representing Arkansas, Florida, Georgia, Indiana, Kentucky, Louisiana, Mississippi, Missouri, Montana, South Carolina, and Texas. As of 2023, Google was represented in the case by attorneys from Williams & Connolly, Wilson Sonsini Goodrich & Rosati, and Ropes & Gray.

In United States v. Google LLC, the federal government alleges that Google has unfairly hindered competition in the search market through anti-competitive deals with Apple as well as mobile carriers. The government alleges that, as a result of these practices, Google has accumulated control of around 88% of the domestic search engine market.

In doing so, the government alleges, Google has additionally monopolized the search advertising market at the expense of competing services. Per the government's estimation, Google has been able to accumulate control of over 70% of the search advertising market. As a result of the lack of competition, Google has been able to over-charge advertisers versus what they would pay in a competitive environment.

Eric Schmidt, formerly CEO of both Google and parent company Alphabet Inc., criticized the lawsuit, stating that "There's a difference between dominance and excellence". On Twitter, Google denied the DOJ's allegations, with the company stating that consumers use "Google because they choose to -- not because they're forced to or because they can't find alternatives."

=== Pre-trial proceedings and developments (2020–2023) ===
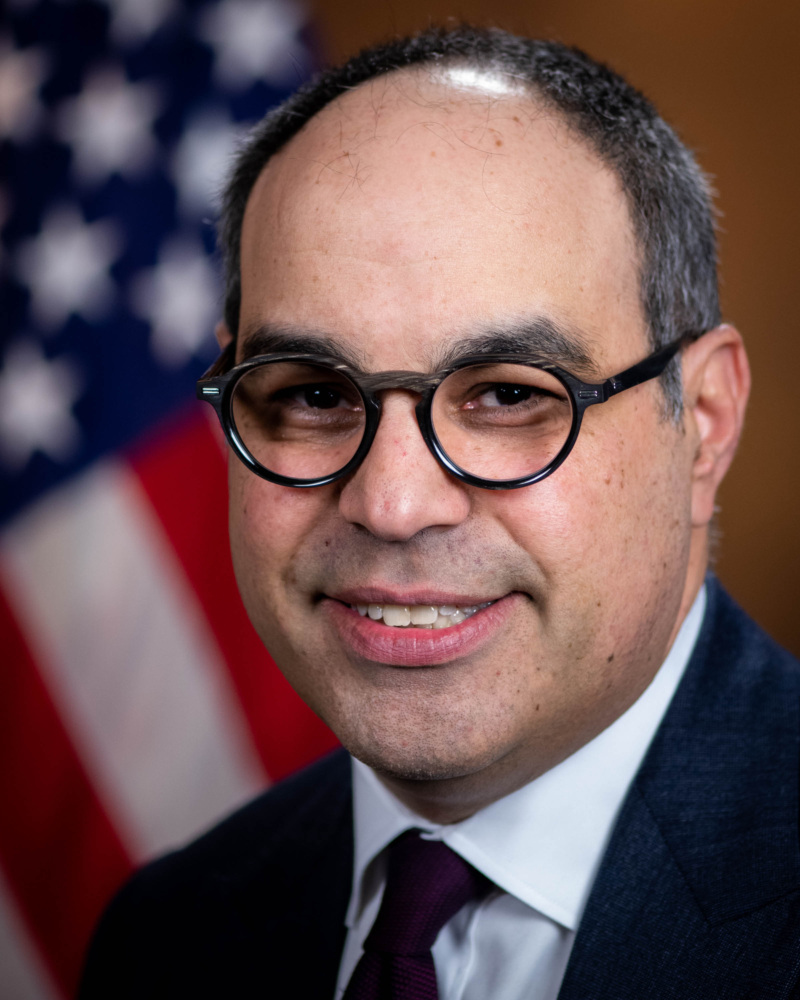
Jonathan Kanter. Assistant Attorney General for the Antitrust Division of the U.S. Department of Justice, led the government's investigation during the Biden Administration.

Owing to the accusation that Google engaged in anti-competitive conduct through exclusivity dealings with Apple, it was reported in February 2022 that the government was looking to depose "Apple's most senior executives." On December 12, 2022, Google asked the court to toss out the case, arguing that the company fairly achieved its dominant market share and that the DOJ's argument "relies on dubious antitrust arguments."

The government's investigation was led by Jonathan Kanter, the Assistant Attorney General for the DOJ Antitrust Division, Google questioned Kanter's impartiality in the case given his past work for rival companies. Constitutional scholar Laurence Tribe criticized Google's claims, arguing they have "little legal basis and strain common sense." In May 2022, Kanter was temporarily removed from the case as the DOJ considered the allegations. Google's demand that Kanter recuse himself was met with criticism from politicians from both major parties; Senator Elizabeth Warren (D-MA) accused the company of engaging in bullying tactics. Kanter was ultimately cleared by the DOJ to continue leading the investigation in January 2023.

In February 2023, the DOJ accused Google of destroying evidence relevant to the lawsuit, and requested that Google be formally sanctioned. The DOJ alleged that Google employees used an internal chat service with "autodelete" settings prior to and during the course of the lawsuit. According to the DOJ, the Federal Rules of Civil Procedure mandated that Google should have ceased the use of auto-deletion of employee chat messages as early as May 2019 in anticipation of a federal lawsuit.

On August 4, 2023, Judge Mehta ruled Google would not have to respond to allegations that its search engine prioritized associated products over competitors, but allowed allegations over Google's use of anti-competitive contracts dealing with search and Android to go to trial.

== Trial (2023–2024) ==
The trial began on September 12, 2023, with Kenneth Dintzer as DOJ's lead attorney. In its opening statements, the DOJ accused Google of unlawfully maintaining a monopoly in the search engine market as early as 2010. Google has defended itself from these accusations, with the company arguing that the high quality of its search products allows it to maintain a dominant position in the market.

During the trial, Judge Mehta received criticism for closing courtroom access for certain testimonies in the case and for delaying the release of public documents pertaining to the case. Media companies including Bloomberg News filed a motion to increase public trial access. Following a week of deliberations between both parties, Mehta decided on September 27 that the DOJ would be permitted to publicly release documents shown in the trial.

Much of the trial centered on Google's deal with Apple to have Google search as the default option on the Safari web browser. Witnesses from Google, Verizon and Samsung testified about the impact of Google's annual payments of approximately $10 billion to maintain default status for Google search. Following the culmination of the government's arguments, Google began its defense on October 26, and the trial concluded on November 16..

Following the trial, Mehta announced that closing arguments in the suit would be held in May 2024, and indicated he was uncertain as to how he would end up ruling in the case. Reuters reported that legal analysts expected an appeal in the case, regardless of how it is decided, while the verdict was expected to set an influential precedent for other federal antitrust suits against "Big Tech" companies like Meta Platforms, Amazon, and Apple.

=== Initial verdict ===
On August 5, 2024, Mehta ruled that Google acted illegally to maintain a monopoly in "general search services and general text advertising". After a hearing in September 2024, Mehta gave regulators until December to propose any penalties to be charged against Google, followed by an approval or rejection of those proposals by August 2025.

The DOJ submitted its proposal on how to remedy Google's search monopoly on November 20, requesting that Judge Mehta should force the company to sell its Chrome web browser and either sell the Android operating system or ban making Google services mandatory on Android devices. The government also requested Mehta to render Google unable to enter into agreements resulting in its search engine automatically being the default in any operating system, as well as to share user data with competitors.

== Remedies trial (2025) ==
The Department of Justice's proposed penalties against Google, to break up its monopoly, were considered in another trial overseen by Judge Mehta in April 2025. In a filing, the DOJ indicated that it would introduce about 400 exhibits over the course of the trial and call 19 witnesses, including multiple senior Google officials. Google listed 20 witnesses, including its CEO Sundar Pichai, while describing the DOJ's proposal as "wildly overboard."

In September 2025, Mehta ruled that Google would not be required to divest of Chrome or Android, but could no longer include search in exclusive contracts. Mehta also ruled that Google would be required to share certain search index data and user interaction data with competitors. In delivering his ruling, Mehta declared “[U]nlike the typical case where the court’s job is to resolve a dispute based on historic facts, here the court is asked to gaze into a crystal ball and look to the future."

Opinions were divided on which side prevailed in this ruling. The Department of Justice declared it a "significant win" in a press release, while Barron's described it as “almost a best-case scenario" for Google's parent company, Alphabet. Writing for The Verge, tech journalist Lauren Feiner said the remedies verdict signaled that the "antitrust fight against Big Tech may already be over." Webbush stock analyst Dan Ives called it a "home run" for Google and "a green light for a bigger Gemini AI partnership between Apple and Google." Quartz described it as a "the business equivalent of a ceasefire."

Mehta ordered Google and the Department of Justice to “meet and confer” and submit a revised final judgment by September 10 that aligns with his opinion. The day of the ruling, Google's stock went up 8 points. Google CEO Sundar Pichai thanked President Donald Trump the day after the remedies trial concluded.

In December 2025, Judge Mehta added details to the injunctions against Google, including an order to make user data more openly available to competitors and to release information on how it trains its artificial intelligence applications. As of early 2026, both Google and the U.S. Department of Justice have appealed different portions of Mehta's ruling, with Google seeking to overturn the judgment that its search engine is a monopoly, while the government continues to contend that company should be split up as originally proposed at the beginning of the suit.

== Responses from government officials ==
The case has attracted public interest amid scrutiny of the four Big Tech companies. United States v. Google LLC has been compared to the United States v. Microsoft Corp. (2002), a noted antitrust case against Microsoft. According to John Newman of the University of Miami School of Law, "U.S. v. Google might be the first big case against Big Tech, but it likely won't be the last." Two months after United States v. Google was filed, the FTC brought an antitrust case against Facebook.

Polling by advocacy group Demand Progress in October 2020 found that respondents across party lines support the suit by a 48% to 36% margin, with 52% of Republicans and 49% of Democrats found to be in support. A survey of tech workers at various firms conducted by workplace app Blind in October 2020 found that 57% of tech employees polled believe the suit has merit, though only 13% of Google workers said the same.

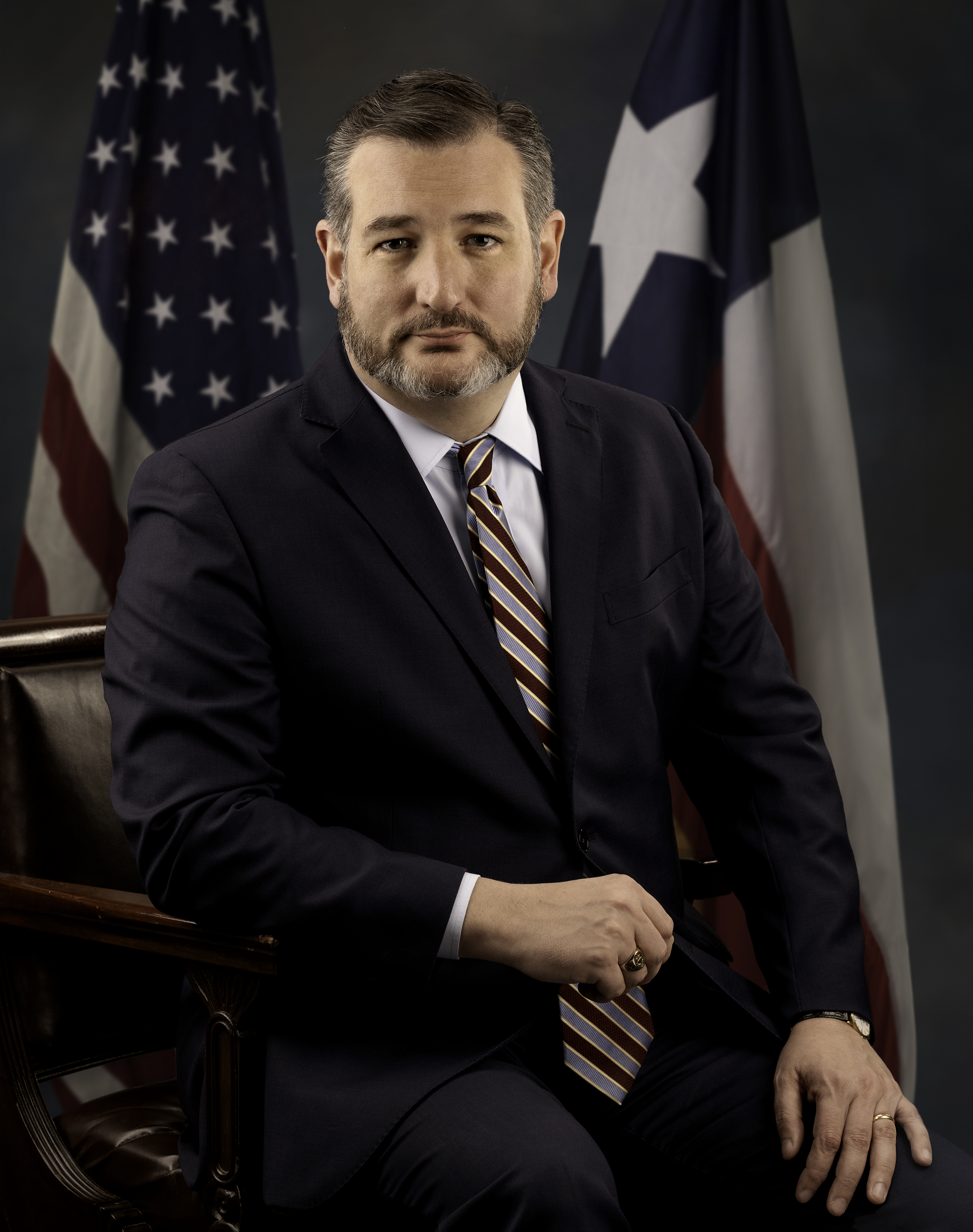
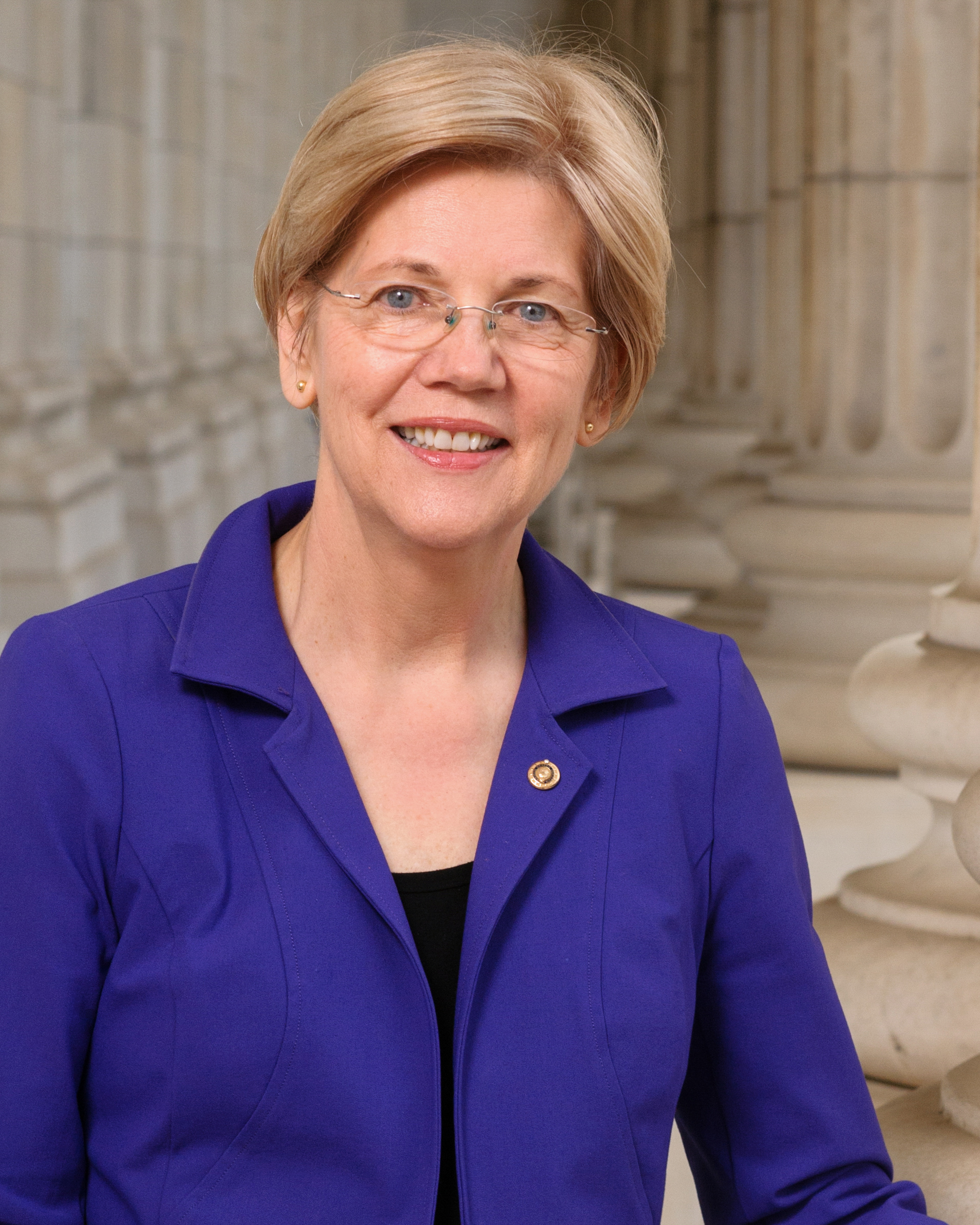
Senators Ted Cruz (R-TX) and Elizabeth Warren (D-MA) spoke favorably about the lawsuit.

Politico noted that the filing of the lawsuit received praise from both Democratic and Republican politicians. Senator Elizabeth Warren (D-MA) praised the DOJ for bringing forth a "legitimate, long-time-coming suit against Google for engaging in anti-competitive, manipulative, and often illegal conduct".

Senator Ted Cruz (R-TX) also praised the lawsuit, arguing that "Google abuses its power not just in the search market by using its monopoly power to make billions, but it also uses it to try to censor the American People". The suit received additional praise from Republican Senators Mike Lee (R-UT) and Josh Hawley (R-MO).

In response to questions regarding the timing of the case, Deputy Attorney General Jeffrey A. Rosen defended the DOJ's timeframe, stating that though "we might have even preferred to be quicker", the DOJ sought to "make sure that we've done the work that's necessary" prior to bringing the case.

== Related government investigations ==
In December 2020, 38 states brought on a similar lawsuit against Google. Co-led by Colorado Attorney General Phil Weiser, the State of Colorado et al. v. Google LLC case reportedly "goes beyond the DOJ's" in its scope of accusations, according to CNBC.

In July 2021, attorneys general from 36 states and the District of Columbia (D.C.) launched an antitrust lawsuit alleging that Google has hindered competition in the app market through its Google Play store policies. In September 2023, all fifty states as well as D.C. and Puerto Rico reportedly "reached an agreement in principle" to settle the case.

In addition to both ongoing federal antitrust lawsuits against Google, it was reported in 2022 that the DOJ was in the process of investigating if Google has engaged in anti-competitive conduct through bundling its Google Maps service with company software. In 2023, Politico reported that the probe focuses on the Google Automotive Services (GAS) offering provided to automakers, which includes the Maps service, the Play store, and Google's voice assistant. The probe also scrutinizes Google's control of location data through Google Maps.

In January 2023, the DOJ filed a second antitrust suit against Google centered on alleged anti-competitive conduct in the advertising technology (adtech) market. A spokesperson for Google denied the allegations of the lawsuit and accused the DOJ of trying to "pick winners and losers in the highly competitive advertising technology sector.”

== See also ==
- Antitrust cases against Google
- Antitrust cases against Google by the European Union
- Big Tech
- Criticism of Google
