= M. Todd Henderson =

American legal scholar

Matthew Todd Henderson
- Education: Princeton University (BSE); University of Chicago (JD)
- Employer: University of Chicago Law School
- Known for: Corporate law and securities regulation

Matthew Todd Henderson is an American legal scholar and novelist who is the Michael J. Marks Professor of Law at the University of Chicago Law School. He is an expert on corporate law and securities regulation. Henderson is also the author of Mental State, a 2018 murder mystery novel.

== Early life ==
He was born in Tennessee in 1970, his great grandmother was a Syrian immigrant. Henderson graduated from Princeton University with a Bachelor of Science in Engineering cum laude in 1993. He was a member of Sigma Xi. He worked for several years designing and building dams in California before commencing his studies at the University of Chicago Law School. He went on to graduate in 1998 with a J.D. degree magna cum laude and was a member of the Order of the Coif and an editor of the University of Chicago Law Review.

== Career ==
After graduating from law school, Henderson clerked for Judge Dennis Jacobs of the United States Court of Appeals for the Second Circuit. Between 1999 and 2001, he practiced as an attorney at Kirkland & Ellis, where he worked alongside now Supreme Court of the United States justice Brett Kavanaugh. Henderson later joined McKinsey & Company as an engagement manager, specializing in counseling telecommunications and high-tech clients on business and regulatory strategy.

Henderson joined the faculty at the University of Chicago Law School in 2004. He served as Aaron Director Teaching Scholar between 2013 and 2015. He has taught and written in the areas of corporate law, securities regulation, derivates, business law, American Indian law, and torts. In particular, he has published books on corporate governance, law and economics, and the intersection of technology and the law, and co-authored casebooks on federal securities law. and securities regulation.

In May 2023, Henderson testified before the Senate Judiciary Subcommittee on Competition Policy, Antitrust and Consumer Rights regarding proposed digital advertising antitrust legislation.

== Authorship ==
Henderson is the author of Mental State (2018), a murder mystery novel. Mental State centers on the death of a conservative law professor in Chicago in what is assumed to be a suicide by everyone besides the deceased academic's brother, a Federal Bureau of Investigation agent.
