= Kent Walker =

American legal executive (1961-)

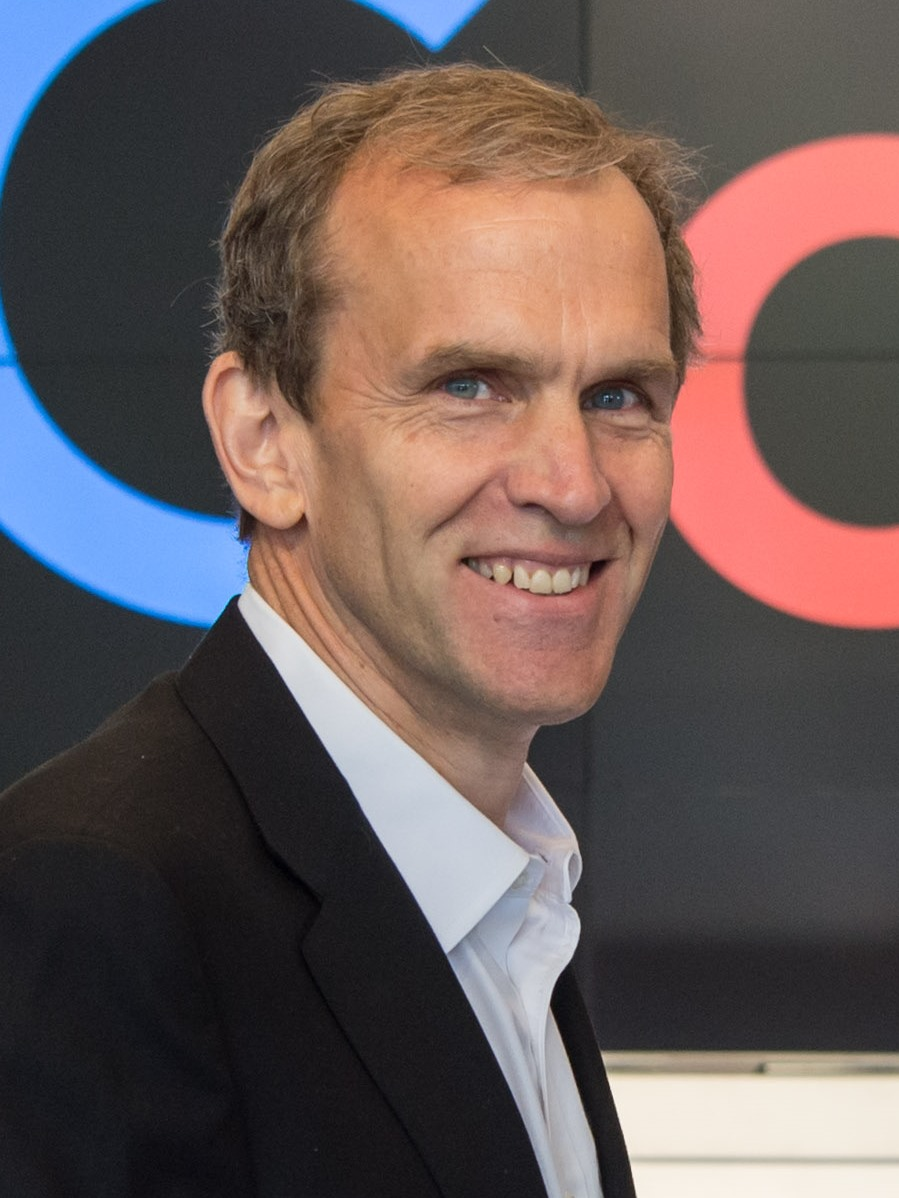

Personal details
- Born: 1961 (age 64–65) Palo Alto, California, U.S.
- Spouse: Diana Walsh
- Education: Harvard University (BA); Stanford University (JD)

Kent Walker (born 1961) is an American legal executive who has served as President of Global Affairs and as an chief legal officer of Google & Alphabet since 2021.

== Early life and education ==
Walker was born in Palo Alto. He graduated from Harvard College in 1983 and received his JD from Stanford Law School.

== Career ==
In 1990, Walker began his legal career in San Francisco at Howard, Rice, Nemerovski, Canady, Robertson & Falk, now Arnold & Porter, and worked as a litigator specializing in government and public law issues. He then served 5 years as an Assistant U.S. Attorney at the United States Department of Justice.

Walker worked at various technology companies, starting in 1995 with Airtouch Communications. From 1997 to 2001 he was deputy general counsel at Netscape, from 2001 until 2004 he worked for Liberate Technologies, and from 2003 until 2006 he was deputy general counsel at eBay.

=== Alphabet Inc. ===
Since 2006, Walker has advised Alphabet Inc.'s board and management on legal and policy issues, its work with governments around the world, its policies for content on its various services, and its philanthropic efforts. Since 2021, he has been President of Global Affairs and chief legal officer at Alphabet. On September 12, 2023 Walker was followed by a man dressed up as Mr. Monopoly, as he went to attend Google's antitrust trial United States v. Google LLC (2023) at federal court in Washington, D.C. in which the DOJ accused Google of illegally abusing its monopoly power as the largest online search tool.

As of 2022, Walker base salary at Alphabet was $1,000,000, with a maximum of a $2,000,000 annual bonus, one tranche of performance stock units of $5,000,000, and one tranche of restricted stock units worth $18,000,000. For 2024, Walker's total compensation from Alphabet was $30.17 million, marking the first time that the general counsel of a US-based corporation was awarded more than $30 million in annual compensation.

=== Board service ===
As of 2018, he served on the Harvard Board of Overseers and was a member of the Council on Foreign Relations. In 2015 he was on the HeartFlow Board of Directors, and advised the Mercy Corps Social Ventures Fund.

== Controversy ==
In 2008, Walker introduced a "communication with care" policy at Google, which resulted in the company adopting a policy of automatic deletion of employee chat logs, a practice that became a source of legal controversy for the company during later federal antitrust lawsuits. In 2024, the American Economic Liberties Project, along with two other advocacy groups, called for the State Bar of California to investigate Walker for allegedly coaching Google to "engage in widespread and illegal destruction" of records relevant to multiple federal lawsuits.

== Personal life ==
As of 2010, Walker was married to Diana Walsh, a former San Francisco Chronicle reporter, and they had three children.
