= United States v. Apple =

United States v. Apple may refer to:

- United States v. Apple (2012), an antitrust case in which the United States District Court for the Southern District of New York held that Apple violated the Sherman Act in conspiring to raise the price of e-books
- United States v. Apple (2016), the Federal Bureau of Investigation's attempt to force Apple to unlock a cryptographically protected iPhone used by one of the perpetrators of the 2015 San Bernardino attack
- United States v. Apple (2024), an antitrust lawsuit filed by the Department of Justice
