= Google Ad Manager =

Ad exchange platform by Google

- Developer: Google
- Release: February 22, 2010; 16 years ago
- Operating system: Cross-platform (web-based application)
- Type: Online advertising
- Website: admanager.google.com/home

Google Ad Manager is an ad management platform introduced by Google on June 27, 2018. for large publishers who have significant direct sales. It combines the features of two former services from Google's DoubleClick subsidiary, DoubleClick for Publishers (DFP; formerly known as DART for Publishers) and DoubleClick Ad Exchange (AdX). Google Ad Manager initially used a second-price auction format, before announcing that it would be replaced with a first-price auction format in March 2019. Google Ad Manager is the free version of this online ad management software and it is recommended for small businesses. Google Ad Manager 360 is the paid version. Google Ad Manager does not require a minimum amount of impressions on individual active ads, but it does have a limit of 200 million impressions per month. Google Ad Manager manages inventory for advertisers, publishers and ad servers. Advertisers are able to manage their inventory of ad creative, publishers are able to manage their ad space inventory, and ad servers can use the platform to determine which ad to serve and where to serve it. Additionally, Google Ad Manager can use data collected from ad performance and ad space performance to make suggested optimizations to the user. These optimizations suggest what the user could change to better reach the goals they have set for a particular campaign.

== History ==
The Google Ad Manager platform started out as two distinct products of the, then independent, DoubleClick company: The DART for Publishers ad server and the DoubleClick Ad Exchange. Google acquired DoubleClick in 2007 securing both products as part of the sale.

In 2010 DART was rebranded as DoubleClick for Publishers. A small business tier was introduced at the same time and the products became popularly known as DFP and DFP Small Business.

In mid 2018 the product name changed again. This time the DoubleClick brand was dropped completely and DoubleClick for Publishers became Google Ad Manager. As well as a rebrand, this change marked a point in the gradual merging of the two former DoubleClick products, with Ad Exchange now becoming a feature of Ad Manager rather than a stand-alone product. The rebrand to Google Ad Manager also saw the end of the Small Business label. The product still offers two tiers of service, but the lower tier is now Google Ad Manager, which the upper tier has been renamed Google Ad Manager 360. This product can sometimes be confused with the plural 'Google Ads Manager' more accurately known as 'Google Ads Editor' - software used to manage Google Ads campaigns outside of the web interface.

== Functionality ==
Google Ad Manager is an online ad exchange platform for companies or individuals. This online server allows a company or person to manage their inventory of ads, the audiences those ads serve, and allows them to check the performance of the ads they are running, and allows them to manage the buying and selling of their ads by other networks. Google Ad Manager is an ad exchange service. This means the content or ads a company or person has on Google Ad Manager can be bought or sold within the platform by other ad agencies or advertising management platforms. One of the primary functions of Google Ad Manager is that it composes reporting for a wide range of analysis. Some of these features include campaign reports, creative reports, network performance reports, network geography reports, monthly ad unit reports, device and browser reports, billing reports, and downloaded impressions. Google Ad Manager operates on a first-price auction process. This means the account with the highest bid for an ad will win the bid for the ad in auction. Google Ad Manager allows users to set up granular targeting for their ads, which helps users better directly target who they are trying to reach. Granular targeting features within Google Ad Manager include setting targets for user devices, browsers, device manufacturers, languages, operating systems and geographical location.

== Antitrust case ==
Main article: United States v. Google LLC (2023)

In 2023, the Justice Department, along with the attorneys general of several states, filed a civil antitrust suit against Google for monopolizing multiple digital advertising technology products in violation of Sections 1 and 2 of the Sherman Act.

The trial began on September 9, 2024, before Judge Leonie Brinkema in the U.S. District Court for the Eastern District of Virginia. During the three-week bench trial, the DOJ presented 25 live witnesses and additional video depositions. Testimony came from publishers including Gannett and News Corp, ad technology competitors such as Index Exchange, The Trade Desk, Pubmatic, Kevel, and former AppNexus CEO Brian O'Kelley, as well as former executives from Facebook and Google itself. Witnesses described being unable to compete with Google's integrated ad server and exchange products, with publishers testifying that they felt they had "no choice" but to use Google's tools despite unfavorable terms. Google's defense argued that the ad technology market remained competitive and that publishers benefited from the company's products.

On April 17, 2025, Judge Brinkema ruled that Google had illegally monopolized the publisher ad server and ad exchange markets, finding that the company "willfully engaged in a series of anticompetitive acts to acquire and maintain monopoly power." The court dismissed a third count alleging monopolization of the advertiser ad network market. Google announced it would appeal the decision.

The remedies phase of the trial began in September 2025, with the Justice Department seeking the divestiture of Google Ad Manager.
