= Kevel =

American advertising technology company

Kevel, Inc.
- Formerly: Adzerk, Inc. (2010–2020)
- Company type: Private
- Industry: Advertising technology, Retail media
- Founded: 2010; 16 years ago in Durham, North Carolina, U.S.
- Founder: James Avery
- Headquarters: Durham, North Carolina, U.S.
- Key people: James Avery (CEO)
- Products: Retail Media Cloud, Kevel Ad Server, Kevel Audience, Kai, Kevel Console
- Website: kevel.com

Kevel, Inc. (formerly Adzerk, Inc.) is an American advertising technology company headquartered in Durham, North Carolina. Founded in 2010 by James Avery, the company provides application programming interface (API)-based ad serving infrastructure. Its Retail Media Cloud platform is used by retailers and marketplaces to operate retail media advertising networks.

Originally operating under the name Adzerk, the company rebranded to Kevel in December 2020. The company has raised over $44 million in venture capital funding across multiple rounds, led primarily by Fulcrum Equity Partners.

Kevel gained public attention when its founder James Avery testified as a government witness in United States v. Google LLC, the U.S. Department of Justice's antitrust case against Google's advertising technology business, in both the initial trial in September 2024 and the remedies phase in late 2025.

== History ==
James Avery, a software engineer, began developing ad serving technology in the late 2000s after acquiring a small advertising network focused on .NET software developers. Concluding that operating an ad network was not viable, Avery decided to build ad serving infrastructure instead, incorporating Adzerk in Durham, North Carolina in 2010.

Adzerk initially offered JavaScript-based ad serving but pivoted to a server-side, API-based approach. Early customers of Adzerk included Stack Overflow, the developer question-and-answer platform. For its first decade, the company grew without significant venture capital investment, a strategy Avery described as "seed strapped."

In December 2020, the company rebranded from Adzerk to Kevel. Avery said the "Ad" in Adzerk caused confusion, as potential customers assumed the company was an advertising network rather than an infrastructure provider. Between 2020 and 2024, the company raised funding in Series A, B, and C rounds totaling over $44 million, led by Fulcrum Equity Partners with participation from investors including Commerce Ventures, Dunnhumby Ventures, and others.

In 2022, Kevel acquired Velocidi, a digital marketing company with operations in Porto, Portugal, that specialized in customer data platforms and machine learning-powered audience segmentation. Following the acquisition, Velocidi's technology was integrated into Kevel's retail media platform to provide enhanced audience and data capabilities.

In July 2023, Kevel formed an independent working group to develop an OpenRTB (Open Real-Time Bidding) programmatic advertising standard for retail media. The group was led by Shamim Samadi, co-founder of Beeswax, and operated in cooperation with the IAB Tech Lab, which maintains the broader OpenRTB specification. The stated goal was to create a standardized protocol for programmatic buying across retail media networks.

In October 2023, Kevel signed a deal with Lyft to power the ride-hailing company's ad server.

In February 2025, Kevel acquired Nexta, a Danish company founded in 2017 that developed automated advertising solutions for off-site retail media channels. The acquisition added off-site advertising across platforms including TikTok and Meta Platforms to Kevel's product line.

In November 2025, Kevel expanded into the Asia-Pacific market, establishing operations in Australia and appointing Chris Woodworth as regional director for the Asia-Pacific region.

=== DOJ v. Google antitrust trial ===
Kevel's founder James Avery testified as a government witness in United States v. Google LLC, the U.S. Department of Justice's antitrust lawsuit alleging that Google illegally monopolized the digital advertising technology market. The case was heard in the United States District Court for the Eastern District of Virginia before Judge Leonie Brinkema.

Avery appeared on the first day of the trial in September 2024, testifying that Adzerk had been unable to compete with Google's DoubleClick for Publishers (DFP) ad server because publishers required access to Google's AdX advertising exchange, which was only fully available through Google's own ad server. Avery stated that this dynamic led the company to exit the open web publishing market and shift to retail media.

On April 17, 2025, Judge Brinkema ruled that Google had illegally monopolized the publisher ad server and ad exchange markets. Avery's testimony was cited multiple times in the court's memorandum opinion. Avery testified again during the remedies phase of the trial, which ran from September through November 2025, supporting structural remedies that would separate Google's ad server from its exchange.

== Products and services ==
Kevel develops advertising infrastructure software for retailers and marketplaces. Its main offering is the Retail Media Cloud, a software-as-a-service platform for building and operating retail media networks. The platform provides ad serving and campaign management technology through application programming interfaces. Adweek has described the company as a competitor to Criteo in the retail media market.

The platform comprises multiple components, including the Kevel Ad Server for ad decisioning and campaign management; Kevel Audience, a customer data platform derived from the company's 2022 acquisition of Velocidi; Kai, a suite of machine learning tools for ad targeting and performance optimization launched in July 2024; and Kevel Console, a campaign management interface based on the company's 2025 acquisition of Nexta.
