= Don't Go to Jail =

Board game

Don't Go to Jail / Monopoly Express
- Designers: Garry Donner
- Publishers: Parker Brothers
- Publication: 1991

Don't Go to Jail is a 1991 Parker Brothers dice game for two or more players inspired by Monopoly.

== Gameplay ==
The game is played by rolling ten dice and attempting to roll matches to score points.

Seven of the dice have various colors, utilities, or railroad icons on them (all from the Monopoly board game). The remaining three dice are blank on four sides, with the other two sides showing "Go," "to", or "jail".

The player scores points for the round if the dice rolled create a monopoly set of colors, utilities, or railroads. The number of dice that need to score points depends on the property. If a die shows the "Go To Jail" icon, that die is placed aside. The player can continue re-rolling unmatched dice until they decide to end their turn and claim their points, or until all three "Go To Jail" dice land face up (causing them to lose all points earned so far that round and pass their turn). One stipulation in the rules is that once a die has been set aside, it cannot be re-rolled during that turn. The dice also feature wilds that may substitute for any symbol on the seven property dice. Two "Wild"s are available to use so it is possible to score a monopoly using only the wilds. The wild die can be moved, but only if the symbol it substitutes for happens to be rolled later that round, in which case the wild must then be immediately placed elsewhere (it cannot be rolled again that same turn).

The game is won when a player earns enough points from matches. The number of points required to win is determined by the players at the start of the match in the original game. These rules also suggest that if a player surpasses the predetermined number of points, the win is not automatic. The player must then wait for all players to have an equal number of turns and should anyone top the feat, they then become the winner.

== Publication history ==
After success publishing Advance to Boardwalk, Parker Brothers published Free Parking and Don't Go to Jail.

=== Monopoly Diced ===
An updated version, called Monopoly DICED! (previously Monopoly Express, first released in the UK and Europe, and later available in a U.S. edition), is also available. The newer game alters the original game play as follows:

- The game is played for "dollars" instead of points.
- It changes the "Go," "to" & "jail" into the "Policeman" from the "Go To Jail" corner of the board game (a.k.a. "Officer Jones").
- One of the blank sides on one of the "Policeman" dice is replaced with a green-arrow "GO" logo that automatically earns the player $200 (this bonus can be lost if the three "Policemen" are rolled).
- It adds an eleventh "House/Hotel" die that can earn (or lose) a player Houses (worth $1000 each), earn Hotels (worth $5000, but only if a player has already earned 4 houses) and a "Get Out Of Jail Free" side that negates a previously rolled "Policeman". (This eleventh die cannot be rolled until a player completes a property group).
- The Wild sides are replaced by "Chance" sides (with the Chance "?" logo) that act as Wilds, but CANNOT be moved after being placed.
- The base winning amount is set at $15,000 (with adjustments to $10,000 for a shorter game or $25,000 for a longer game) with no "catch-up" opportunity; the first player to reach the set goal wins.

== Game notes ==
- As with the pre-September 2008 non-U.S. versions of the original Monopoly, Monopoly Express/Monopoly Diced has the lowest color group dice faces colored brown (as opposed to the U.S. board's & DGTJ's original dark purple). This applies to the new releases of the U.S. edition of the game as well, thus making it the first U.S.-based Monopoly game to use brown for its lowest-valued properties (the standard Monopoly game and the U.S. Edition of the Here & Now: World Edition would follow).
