= Free Parking =

Card game by Parkers Brothers

- Designers: Charles Phillips
- Publishers: Parker Brothers
- Publication: 1988
- Genres: Children's game

Free Parking is a card game published by Parker Brothers in 1988 that is inspired by the "Free Parking" space of the Monopoly board game.

== Description ==
Free Parking is a children's card game for 2–4 players in which players can only score points if they have enough time left in their parking meter.

=== Set-up ===
Each player is given a parking meter, and is dealt five cards. The rest of the cards are set aside in a draw pile. A second card deck titled "Second Chance" is also set out.

=== Gameplay ===
The first player can either:

- draw enough cards to bring their hand to 6 cards, then play a card from their hand

OR

- discard three cards and pick up three replacement cards.

Regardless of the player's choice, they can also choose to draw a card from the Second Chance deck.

Play then passes to the player on the left.

=== Player cards ===
There are six different Player cards that can be drawn:

- Feed the Meter: The player raises the time on their meter by the number of minutes indicated to a maximum of 60 minutes.
- Points: The player places the card on the table in front of their meter and deducts a number of minutes on their meter equal to the points on the card. The player must have enough minutes on their meter to play the Points card.
- Officer Jones: This can be played anytime against a player who has zero minutes showing on their meter. That player must discard one of their face-up Points cards.
- Free Parking: Playing this card protects the player from Officer Jones. The next time the player plays a Points card, no time is deducted from the player's parking meter, and the Free Parking card is discarded.
- Time Expires: This card can be played against another player, and reduces the time on their parking meter to zero.
- Talk Your Way Out of It: This can block any action that is being done to the person including the Officer Jones card.

=== Victory conditions ===
The first player to accumulate 200 points is the winner.

== Publication history ==
Parker Brothers published Monopoly (based on The Landlord's Game created by Lizzie Magie in 1903) in 1935, and it became one of the most popular board games in the world. In 1988, Charles Phillips created a children's card game. Although the game was unrelated to Monopoly, the name of the "Free Parking" square on the Monopoly board was used as the title of the new card game, and iconic Monopoly graphics were used on the box cover.

After success publishing Advance to Boardwalk, Parker Brothers published Free Parking and Don't Go to Jail. Free Parking debuted in 1988, and was distributed by Winning Moves while being trademarked by Hasbro.

== Reception ==
Eric Mortensen, writing for Geeky Hobbies, thought that the link to Monopoly was weak and added nothing to the game. As for the game itself, Mortensen noted that "Free Parking's greatest strength is probably the fact that it is really easy to play." Mortensen concluded, "The game is fun if you are looking for a game where you don't have to put too much thought into what you are doing. The problem is that the game's strategy is generally pretty obvious.This makes Free Parking a game that relies heavily on luck. Whoever has the most luck on their side is likely going to win."

Fun Board Games liked the game, saying, "Free Parking is ultimately a card game where players have to stay on their toes and be aware of what they are playing and discarding. Any pitfalls that players fall into could be the difference between reaching 200 points to win or falling short and losing ... If you are a fan of Monopoly-related materials then you will love Free Parking."

Philip Orbanes, in his book The Monopoly Companion, noted "Free Parking is really a card game with a great twist — the 'time is ticking' principle of the parking meters. The game requires that you stay on your toes and make the best of what you get on short notice."
