= FairSearch =

Group of organizations

- Type: Political advocacy group
- Founded: October 2010
- Area served: Worldwide
- Website: fairsearch.org

FairSearch is a group of organizations that lobby against Google's market dominance in online search and related practices. The group is controlled by Oracle and Naspers executives and has been characterized as a consumer protection organization, a Google watchdog, and a front group for Microsoft. Many of its other members are also Google competitors, such as Expedia and Oracle.

Established in October 2010, FairSearch was formed as an international non-profit association incorporated under Belgian Law by travel verticals and online travel agencies to oppose Google's acquisition of travel software firm ITA followed by Microsoft in December that same year. In September 2012 Oracle and Nokia joined in filing a complaint regarding Android with the European Commission, alleging that its free-of-charge distribution model constituted anti-competitive predatory pricing.

From at least 2011 to at least 2014, former Attorney General of Rhode Island Patrick Lynch was working with the Digital Citizens Alliance, sending messages to US attorneys and encouraging them to investigate Google.

FairSearch hired Thomas Vinje, a top antitrust lawyer from Clifford Chance, as well as the PR firms Burson Marsteller and FIPRA International, to lobby lawmakers and journalists. In the EU transparency register, Burson Marsteller acknowledges having received up to €199,999 from FairSearch in 2016, and FIPRA International €49,999. Elizabeth De Bony, Director at Burson-Marsteller acts as executive director of FairSearch. However, the latter's filings with Belgian authorities stated in 2017 it received no money or membership fees since its creation in 2013. "The origin of the money to pay these outside advisers remains unknown.”

In December 2016, Microsoft quietly ceased its financial support for FairSearch.
