= AMERICA Act =

U.S. bipartisan antitrust proposal

- Long title: Advertising Middlemen Endangering Rigorous Internet Competition Accountability Act
- Announced in: the 118th United States Congress
- Number of co-sponsors: 10

Legislative history
- Introduced in the United States Senate by Mike Lee (R–UT) on March 30, 2023; Committee consideration by United States Senate Committee on the Judiciary

The Advertising Middlemen Endangering Rigorous Internet Competition Accountability (AMERICA) Act (S.1073) is a proposed bipartisan antitrust bill in the United States Congress. The legislation was introduced by Senator Mike Lee (R-UT) in the 118th Congress on March 30, 2023.

The legislation aims to combat monopoly power in the advertising technology (adtech) market and has been characterized as an effort to rein in Google and Facebook's dominance in the sector. The legislation is roughly equivalent to legislation proposed by Lee in the 117th Congress.

== Background ==
The bill has been characterized as an effort to rein in Google and Facebook's dominance in the advertising technology sector. Google and Facebook controlled an estimated 48.4% of spending in the digital advertising market as of 2022. In January 2023, the United States Department of Justice filed an antitrust suit against Google over alleged anti-competitive conduct in the digital advertising sector.

In the 117th Congress, Lee introduced the Competition and Transparency in Digital Advertising Act (CTDA), which Lee described as "functionally identical" to the AMERICA Act. The CTDA received six Senate cosponsors in the 117th Congress.

== Provisions ==
The AMERICA Act would specifically amend the Clayton Antitrust Act of 1914 “to prevent conflicts of interest and promote competition in the sale and purchase of digital advertising”. The bill would specifically prohibit companies with more than $20 billion in annual digital advertising revenue from owning more than one type of digital advertising service, while companies with more than $5 billion in annual digital advertising revenue that "provide brokerage services to buyers or sellers of digital advertisements" would be required to "act in the best interest" of their brokerage customers. The rules would be enforced by the DOJ, state attorneys general, and private right of action.

If enacted, the legislation would curb the ability of companies who process over $20 billion in digital advertising transactions from controlling more than one area of the broader digital advertising business. The AMERICA Act would also prevent "demand-side" digital advertising platforms from owning "supply-side" platforms operating in the sector in most circumstances. Additionally, the legislation would institute regulations on medium-sized companies in the adtech market which process over $5 billion in digital advertising transactions.

== Legislative history ==
On May 3, 2023, the Senate Judiciary Subcommittee on Competition Policy, Antitrust and Consumer Rights held a hearing to consider the legislation.

=== Cosponsors ===
In addition to Lee, the legislation has been cosponsored by ten U.S. Senators. Gizmodo called the backing senators a "powerful and bizarre coalition" of both Democrats and Republicans.

Democratic cosponsors:

- Amy Klobuchar (D-MN)
- Richard Blumenthal (D-CT)
- Elizabeth Warren (D-MA)

Republican cosponsors:

- Ted Cruz (R-TX)
- Marco Rubio (R-FL)
- Eric Schmitt (R-MO)
- Josh Hawley (R-MO)
- Lindsey Graham (R-SC)
- JD Vance (R-OH)
- John Kennedy (R-LA)

== See also ==
- United States v. Google LLC, an ongoing federal antitrust case launched in 2023 that targets Google's alleged monopoly in the digital advertising market
- United States antitrust law
