= Antitrust cases against Google by the European Union =

EU's anti-trust campaign against Google

Since 2010, the European Union has investigated several antitrust complaints against Google alleging abuses of its dominant position in breach of the EU's competition laws. Three complaints have resulted in formal charges against Google: those relating to Google Shopping, the Android operating system and to Google AdSense. Google has been found guilty of antitrust breaches in the three cases and has been fined over €8 billion. In 2020, the European Union has also launched a full investigation of Google's proposed acquisition of the fitness tracker and wearable health company Fitbit, under the EU Merger Regulation. The operation was eventually cleared on 17 December 2020 subject to conditions.

== Google Shopping investigation ==
=== Prior complaints ===
On 3 November 2009, at the suggestion of a Microsoft-backed PR firm, Infederation Ltd. (Foundem) filed a complaint with the European Commission (EC) accusing Google of breaching EU competition law and was soon joined by others, including on 31 March 2011 Microsoft itself which was then waging a regulatory war against Google. and on 30 January 2013, the Initiative for a Competitive Online Marketplace ("ICOMP"). The core claim being that Google's Universal Search algorithm promoted Google's own products in search engine results pages and demoted links to competing comparative shopping services and depriving end users of competition on the merits of the products and services so promoted.

=== The EU's competitive concerns ===
On 10 November 2010, the European Commission opened a formal investigation into Google's search practices. Despite pursuing negotiations with Google for commitments under Article 9 of Regulation 1/2003 and despite being offered commitments by Google that ‘address the Commission's concerns’, the Commission, allegedly under political pressure, issued a Statement of Objections (SO) to Google on 15 April 2015 followed by a Supplementary SO in July 2016. The preliminary conclusion of the Commission's investigation was that Google gave systematic favourable treatment to its own Google Shopping product (including Google Product Search) in search results.

The specific complaints issued by the EC included:

- Google's search results predominately display Google Shopping results regardless of the merits of how well the Google Shopping results met the results of the search query.
- Google does not apply its system of penalties, a predefined set of parameters to lower the placement of shopping results, to its own Google Shopping results as it did to other competitors.
- Google had already attempted a shopping product, Froogle, but which it did not give any preferential treatment, and as a result, performed poorly. In contrast, Google Shopping was given favorable placement in Google's search result, allowing the service to achieve higher rates of growth.
- Google's favoring of Google Shopping thus had a negative impact on consumers and innovation.

=== Decision and impact ===
On 27 June 2017, the EC imposed a fine of €2.4 billion (about US$2.7 billion) on Google for abusing its dominance, the largest such antitrust fine issued by the EC. Google has denied the European Union's accusations against them and made a statement claiming "its services had helped the region's digital economy grow". The fine represented just over 2.5% of Google's 2016 revenue. Google accordingly challenged the decision before the EU General Court. Google nevertheless did not ask the suspension of the decision and complied with its 'equal treatment' requirement by separating its comparison shopping service into its own company. The Google Shopping service is still part of Google, but is run completely separately with its own revenues and profits. This "EU Compliance mechanism", according to Bloomberg, allows even treatment to businesses, no matter if they compete with Google or not.

On 12 November 2020, 135 companies and 30 industry associations wrote an open letter to the EU Commission alleging that three years after the decision Google was still not complying and was moreover still favouring of its other specialised search services. The undersigned urged the commission to intervene. However, Margrethe Vestager stated in 2021 that the Commission did not intend to investigate Google for noncompliance with either the Google Shopping or the Google Android decision.

On 10 November 2021, the General Court of the EU largely dismissed Google's challenge and upheld the fine of €2.42 billion imposed by the commission. Google appealed the judgment with the European Court of Justice, who ultimately upheld the fine on 10 September 2024.

== Android investigation ==
=== Prior complaints ===
The EC's actions to investigate Google's approach to the Android operating system was predicated on several complaints it had received. The first complaint was lodged by FairSearch. FairSearch was established in 2010 as a coalition of travel-related web companies including Expedia and TripAdvisor to try to fight against Google's proposed acquisition of ITA, which had developed airfare search software. The group shifted towards becoming more of a Google watchdog group, looking at all instances of Google's activities which they considered were potentially anti-competition. Companies like Microsoft, Nokia, and Oracle joined the group to support this broader effort. Prior to their attention to the Android system, FairSearch issued complaints to the EC over how Google's search engines would preferentially weigh results from Google's own services or its partners over others, as part of antitrust investigations conducted by the EU since 2010. On 25 March 2013, the European branch of FairSearch filed a formal complaint to the EU, who were still investigating Google from previous complaints, citing that Google's practices with Android violated various EU's antitrust laws. The complaint identified that Google required any original equipment manufacturer (OEM) wanting to install Google's suite of Android apps, including access to the Google Play Store, had to license the entire suite and feature them predominately on the mobile device.

A second complaint was filed by Aptoide on 16 June 2014, an alternative marketplace for Android apps. Aptoide asserted that Google's approach to Android made it difficult for alternatives to the Google Play store to be installed, and that some of the components that were once part of Google's Android Open Source Project were moved into the Google Mobile Services suite, including Gmail, Google Maps, and the Play Store. Further complaints were lodged by Yandex and Disconnect Inc. in April and June 2015.

=== The EU's competitive concerns ===
On 15 April 2015, the European Commission started an official investigation against Google following on the complaints filed by FairSearch and Aptoide and its own internal evaluation of these complaints over about a year. The EC stated that the company may have taken unlawful actions to maintain Google's dominant position in the mobile market by how it licensed its suite of Android applications. The new investigation was announced alongside the EC's findings in its antitrust investigation into Google's search engine practices, but otherwise treated as a separate action against Google.

The Commission identified three points of concern in the first Statement of Objections:

1. Whether Google actions impede development of the market of mobile devices and access of competitors thereto by demanding or encouraging smart phone manufacturers to pre-install Google apps and services on their devices.
2. Whether Google suppressed attempts of smart phone and tablet PC manufacturers willing to install Google apps on their devices to run on modified and potentially competitive versions of Android.
3. Whether Google unlawfully impeded the market development by way of tacking the installation of certain Google apps with the use of other apps of this company or its software interface.

Google countered to this investigation that their practices with Android were no different with how Apple, Inc. or Microsoft bundles their own proprietary apps on their respective iOS and Windows Phone, and that OEMs were still able to distribute Android-based phones without the Google suite of apps.

During the investigation, Google formed Alphabet Inc., a holding company for Google's various subsidiaries, with Google becoming one of Alphabet's subsidiaries.

A year after, on 20 April 2016, the European Commission announced the issue of the second Statement of Objections, now addressing both Google and Alphabet within its charges. The new set of complaints, amending those of the first Statement of Objections, asserted Google violated EU's antitrust laws by:

- requiring mobile manufacturers to pre-install Google Search and Google Chrome browser and requiring them to set Google Search as default search service on their devices, as a condition to license certain Google proprietary apps;
- preventing manufacturers from selling smart mobile devices running on competing operating systems based on the Android open source code;
- giving financial incentives to manufacturers and mobile network operators on condition that they exclusively pre-install Google Search on their devices.

The potential fines for the case, if Google were to be found violating antitrust laws, has a maximum amount of 10% of the company's annual revenue, about US$7.4 billion at the time of the issuing of the Second Statement of Objection.

=== Decision and impact ===
On 19 July 2018, EU fined Google €4.3 billion (about US$5 billion). Google responded it would appeal the fine, which it did in October 2018. According to company spokesperson Al Verney "Android has created more choice for everyone, not less". To date, this fine is the biggest ever imposed by European Union on a company for anti-competitive behaviour. European Union Competition Commissioner Margrethe Vestager, who was part of the decision against Google, stated that only after the EU found against Google in the search anti-trust case in 2017 did Google attempt to settle on the issues of the Android anti-trust issues, which was far too late after the EU filed the initial charges against Google. In October 2018 Google revamped how it would distribute its Google Play Store with Android in the future: Charging a licensing fee for the store, without requiring installation of Google apps, but making it free to pre-install the Google apps if they want. Furthermore, Google's hardware partners will be allowed to market devices in the EU that run rival versions of Android or other operating systems. In March 2019 Google announced that it will give European users of Android phones an option of which browser and search engine they want on their phone at the time of purchase to further comply with the EU's decision.

== AdSense investigation ==
=== Prior complaints ===
The Commission opened the procedure following the re-allocation to the Commission in January 2010 of a complaint submitted by Ciao GmbH to the German Bundeskartellamt. In March 2011, Microsoft lodged a similar complaint, followed in March 2012 by Expedia, in January 2013 by the Initiative for a Competitive Online Marketplace ("ICOMP") and in May 2014 by Deutsche Telekom AG. However, on 21 April 2016, Microsoft withdrew its and Ciao's complaints against Google.

=== The EU's competitive concerns ===
On 13 March 2013, the Commission adopted a preliminary assessment addressed to Google under Article 9 of Regulation (EC) No 1/2003 listing the potential antitrust issues related to Google AdSense. Google offered three sets of commitments to address the competition concerns. The Commission eventually issued a Statement of Objections on 14 July 2016. These objections were centered on how Google licensed AdSense to their direct partners:

- Google required direct partners to exclusively use Google's AdSense and could not engage with Google's competitors;
- Google required that partners take a minimum number of Google ads and predominately place them above any other advertising, nor could place ads from other services above or alongside Google's ads;
- Google required partners get confirmation from Google before making any changes for how they displayed Google's competitors' ads.

The Commission found no justification for these restrictions other than to exclude Google's competitors (such as Microsoft and Yahoo) from the market for online search advertising. The Commission considered that this resulted in less choice for users in selecting advertising services and higher prices ultimately being passed on to consumers.

=== Decision and impact ===
On 20 March 2019, the European Commission imposed a fine of €1.49 billion on Google and Alphabet for abusive practices in online advertising. At the same time, the European Commission said that Google could be sued for damages before national courts by competing online search advertising intermediaries as well as from website operators who had limited options for monetising advertising space on their sites.

Some competition lawyers argue that Google's entire business model relies on the profitability of its search advertising results and that the non-discrimination obligation imposed by the Commission could threaten the viability of Google's business' two-sided model whereby customers (Google's advertisers or the rivals' advertisers) are selected in a discretionary manner in order to provide free services (search toolbar on third-party websites).

Given that Google had already changed its behaviour, after receiving the Commission's Statement of Objections in 2016, there are nonetheless no discussions on compliance with the Commission's decision.

On 4 June 2019, Google and Alphabet appealed the decision in front of the General Court.

== Adtech investigation ==
In June 2021, the European Commission opened an investigation into Google's potentially anti-competitive behaviour in the Adtech space.

On 4 September 2025, the European Commission imposed a fine of €2.95 billion (about US$3.4 billion) on Google.

== Fitbit acquisition investigation ==
On 15 June 2020, Google notified its intended acquisition of Fitbit to the EU Commission. Fitbit is an American company active in the development, manufacturing and distribution of wearable devices (both smartwatches and fitness trackers) and connected scales in the health and wellness sector. On 4 August 2020, the European Commission announced that it would be launching an in-depth investigation into Google's proposed acquisition of the fitness tracker and health platform, Fitbit, under the EU Merger Regulation. The commission expressed its concern that the acquisition would further entrench Google's dominant position in the online advertising market, with the potential augmentation of user health and fitness data from Fitbit.

Following its investigation, the commission had concerns that the transaction, would have harmed competition in several markets. First, in the advertising markets. By acquiring Fitbit, Google would acquire (i) the database maintained by Fitbit about its users' health and fitness; and (ii) the technology to develop a database similar to that of Fitbit. By increasing the already vast amount of data that Google could use for the personalisation of ads, it would be more difficult for rivals to match Google's services in the markets for online search advertising, online display advertising, and the entire "ad tech" ecosystem. The transaction would therefore have raised barriers to entry and expansion for Google's competitors for these services to the detriment of advertisers, who would ultimately face higher prices and have less choice. Second as regards access to Web Application Programming Interface (‘API') in the market for digital healthcare: A number of players in this market currently access health and fitness data provided by Fitbit through a Web API, in order to provide services to Fitbit users and obtain their data in return. The Commission found that following the transaction, Google might restrict competitors' access to the Fitbit Web API. Such a strategy would come especially at the detriment of start-ups in the nascent European digital healthcare space. Third, in the market for wrist-worn wearable devices: The Commission was concerned that following the transaction, Google could put competing manufacturers of wrist-worn wearable devices at a disadvantage by degrading their interoperability with Android smartphones.

However, on 17 December 2020, the Commission eventually cleared the transaction, after Google accepted to significantly improve commitments proposed earlier, following the feedback received by market participants. These commitments are: first that Google will not use certain health and fitness data that are generated from Fitbit devices in or for Google Ads. To comply, Google will maintain these data in a separate 'data silo'. Google will also provide users with an "effective choice to grant or deny the use" of certain data by other Google services such as Google Search, Google Maps, Google Assistant, and YouTube. Second, Google will provide third parties access to the data types made available in the Fitbit Web API, subject to certain privacy and security requirements. Google will update the types of data available through the API based on an update mechanism that reflects what data types other industry participants make available through their APIs. Finally, Google will continue for 10 years to make available to wrist-worn wearable OEMs (i) a set of APIs that relate to "current core functionalities that wrist-worn devices need to interoperate with an Android smartphone" and (ii) all Android APIs that Google will make available to other Android smartphone app developers. The duration of the commitments is ten years. Because of Google's entrenched position in the market for online advertisement, the Commission may decide to extend the duration of the Ads Commitment by up to an additional ten years, having justified the necessity for such an extension. A trustee will monitor the implementation of the commitments. To fulfil its duties, the trustee will have far-reaching competences, including access to Google's records, personnel, facilities or technical information. The monitoring trustee will also be entitled to share the reports it provides for and provided to the commission with the Irish Data Protection Commission. The commitments also include a fast track dispute resolution mechanism that can be invoked by third parties.

The traditional approach followed by the Commission in its competitive assessment of the Google/Fitbit acquisition, was criticized because the commission has defined markets narrowly in ways that minimized overlaps while allegedly failing to examine the transaction's potential effects in broader ecosystems. "Indeed, even on this traditional approach, the Commission refrained from considering plausible market segments that would arguably better match the theories of harm it explored (e.g., a market for wrist-worn wearable devices connecting to Android smartphones and controlled by Google either directly or via their OS)". However, the Chief economist of DG Competition stressed that the commission has the burden of proof if it wants to block an acquisition and that the standard of proof is a ‘balance of probabilities’. This does not allow the commission to put an especially heavy weight on a low-probability event, however damaging it might be. "A negative decision would almost certainly have been overturned by the General Court".

== See also ==
- European Union law
- Russia antitrust case
- Microsoft Corp v Commission
