= FTC v. Amazon =

2023 lawsuit brought against the multinational technology company Amazon

Federal Trade Commission et al v. Amazon.com, Inc
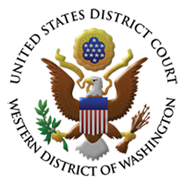
- Court: United States District Court for the Western District of Washington
- Full case name: Federal Trade Commission, State of New York, State of Connecticut, Commonwealth of Pennsylvania, State of Delaware, State of Maine, State of Maryland, Commonwealth of Massachusetts, State of Michigan, State of Minnesota, State of Nevada, State of New Hampshire, State of New Jersey, State of New Mexico, State of Oklahoma, State of Oregon, State of Rhode Island and State of Wisconsin v. Amazon.com, Inc.
- Docket nos.: 2:23-cv-01495

Federal Trade Commission, et al. v. Amazon.com, Inc. is a lawsuit brought against the multinational technology company and online retailer Amazon in 2023. The Federal Trade Commission (FTC), joined by the attorneys general of seventeen U.S. states, alleges that Amazon holds and abuses an online retail monopoly.

== Background ==
Amazon is a multinational technology company founded by Jeff Bezos in 1994 as a bookseller that has since become the world's largest online retailer. The company has expanded to other ventures such as Amazon Prime Video and Amazon Web Services. As of 2022, it had a turnover of over $500 billion, making it one of the largest companies in the world. The case drew comparisons to a notable Yale Law journal article written by incumbent FTC Chair, Lina Khan, that used Amazon as an example of how United States antitrust law should be rewritten. Will Oremus of the Washington Post noted that the actual case was much more tempered than the arguments put forth by Khan in her article.

== Claims ==
The case, filed in the U.S. state of Washington, alleges that Amazon took part in a number of anti-competitive practices.

The FTC and states allege Amazon's anticompetitive conduct occurs in two markets—the online superstore market that serves shoppers and the market for online marketplace services purchased by sellers.

The alleged anticompetitive practices include:

- Anti-discounting measures
- Conditioning sellers' ability to obtain Amazon Prime eligibility for their products

and seeking to extract monopoly rents by:

- Replacing organic search results with paid advertisements and "junk" ads
- Biasing Amazon's search results
- Charging costly fees to sellers

The plaintiffs are seeking a permanent injunction in federal court that would prohibit Amazon from engaging in these practices.

== See also ==
- Big Tech
