= Advance to Boardwalk =

Board game

- Publishers: Parker Brothers; Winning Moves
- Publication: 1985; 41 years ago

Advance to Boardwalk is a 1985 spin-off of the Parker Brothers board game Monopoly.

== Setting ==
Like its progenitor, its setting is the real-estate world in Atlantic City, New Jersey, but focuses only on the boardwalk. It involves the building of hotels, which are constructed by the various players who place markers to indicate the growing floors of the hotels.

More than one player can have floors in a given hotel, but much like Monopoly, advantages can be gained by owning a majority of floors in a given hotel.

== Game mechanics ==
The board begins with a series of empty lots along the boardwalk, arranged in color groups, and laid out with property value cards. Trespassing dice are thrown: two standard numeric six-sided dice, and a special color die. The total number tells the player how much they are allowed to spend; the color die tells the player within which color group they can spend. The color die could also tell the player that they can build in any color group (when the die comes up as a "W", for "Wild"), or that they have to draw a card (when the die comes up as an "F", for "Fortune Card").

When building, players can place as many hotel floors as desired on as many properties as able, up to the total numeric amount shown on the dice, and within the color group indicated. For example, if a 2 and 5 and "blue" are rolled, the player can place as many floors as he or she can on lots in the blue color group, up to $7 million. If the lots are empty, the player takes the property cards for those lots after "building floors." At the end of the turn, the player moves their token up the boardwalk to the space that matches their new total in property values.

Opponents can "take over" a hotel, and take the property value cards for the hotel, by building more floors on an existing lot. In the event of ties, the color closest to "ground level" keeps the property value card. In the event of a "takeover", the player who gains control of the lot can move his or her token up the boardwalk in the amount equal to the property, and his or her opponent's token down the boardwalk in the amount equal to the property.

"Fortune Cards", collected regularly, allow players to take advantage of construction bonuses, natural disasters, and other events to add and remove floors. Cards are picked up when an "F" is rolled (which usually overrides construction in that player's turn), or when certain spaces on the boardwalk are reached, marked with an "F". The first player to pass $35 million in hotel property value wins the game.

== Computer Version ==
A home computer version of Advance to Boardwalk was released in 1990 by GameTek, for Apple II, Commodore 64, and IBM PC compatible machines.
