= Big Tech =

Largest and most influential technology companies in the world

The largest corporations by market capitalization in 2026, with the "Big Five" tech companies in green

Big Tech, also known as the tech giants or tech titans, are the largest and most powerful technology companies in the world. It most commonly refers to the five dominant companies in the U.S. technology industry—Microsoft, Apple, Alphabet (Google), Amazon, and Meta (Facebook)—which are also some of the largest companies in the world by market capitalization, making up about a quarter of the S&P 500. Other large technology companies, such as Netflix, Nvidia, Tesla, SpaceX, and Oracle are sometimes included but usually referred to separately. The term Big Tech is similar to terms for other powerful industries, such as Big Media, Big Oil, Big Pharma, and Big Tobacco. Careers in Big Tech, particularly in technical fields such as software engineering and product management, are considered highly competitive.

== History ==
In the late 20th century, IBM, Microsoft, and Apple dominated the worldwide information technology industry. After the dot-com bubble wiped out most of the Nasdaq Composite stock market index, surviving tech startups expanded their market share and became dominant in their markets. The term Big Tech began to appear around 2013, when some economists speculated that a lack of regulation could lead to concentrated market power. The concept of Big Tech is similar to how the largest oil companies were called Big Oil following the 1970s energy crisis, and the largest cigarette producers were called Big Tobacco, as Congress attempted to regulate those industries. It is also similar to how, at the beginning of the 21st century, the mainstream media became dominated by a small number of corporations called Big Media or the media giants.

== Nicknames ==
=== Acronyms ===
Acronyms including FANG, FAANG, GAFA, GAFAM, MAGA, and MAMAA have been used to refer to Big Tech companies. Alphabet (formerly Google) may be represented by G, and Meta (formerly Facebook), may be represented by F. In 2026, due to the AI boom, Jim Cramer referred to Meta, Anthropic, Nvidia, Google, OpenAI, and SpaceX as MANGOS.

Jim Cramer coined the acronym FANG in 2013, referring to Facebook, Amazon, Netflix, and Google. Cramer called them "totally dominant in their markets." Cramer stated that the four companies were poised to "take a bite out of" the declining market, giving a double meaning to the acronym, according to Cramer's colleague at RealMoney.com, Bob Lang. Cramer expanded FANG to FAANG in 2017, adding Apple to the list because its revenue made it a potential Fortune 500 company.

Following Facebook's name change to Meta Platforms in October 2021, as well as the 2015 creation of Google holding company Alphabet, Cramer suggested replacing FAANG with MAMAA, replacing Netflix with Microsoft because Netflix's valuation had fallen behind the other companies. With Microsoft, these companies were each valued at over $900 billion compared to Netflix's $310 billion. In November 2021, The Motley Fool suggested MANAMANA (a reference to the 1968 song "Mah Nà Mah Nà") as an acronym for Microsoft, Apple, Netflix, Alphabet, Meta, Amazon, Nvidia, and Adobe.

Internationally, Baidu, Alibaba, Tencent, and Xiaomi, collectively referred to as BATX, are considered Chinese competitors to Big Tech. In 2019, Amy Webb referred to the Big Five, IBM, Alibaba, Baidu, and Tencent as G-MAFIA BAT.

=== Big Four ===
In the early 2010s, Alphabet, Amazon, Apple, and Meta were referred to as the Big Four, The Four, the Gang of Four, and the Four Horsemen. Eric Schmidt, Phil Simon, and Scott Galloway grouped the Big Four together based on their ability to create social change. They serve billions of users, and are able to influence user behavior and control large amounts of user data. As such, they have been criticized for creating a new economic order called surveillance capitalism. According to Simon and Galloway, this distinguishes them from other Big Tech companies such as Microsoft and IBM.

In 2011, Google executive chair Eric Schmidt excluded Microsoft from the group, stating, "Microsoft is not driving the consumer revolution in the minds of the consumers." In the late 2010s, Microsoft changed its business strategy, causing its market value to increase, leading to its widespread inclusion in Big Tech and creating the term Big Five.

=== Big Five ===
Big Five tech companies (2026) (Note: Based on data from the 2022 Fortune 500)
Company	Revenue (USD billion)	Profit (USD billion)	Subsidiaries
Alphabet	403	132	DeepMind; Google; Waymo
Amazon	717	78	Audible; Ring; Twitch; AWS
Apple	479	132	Beats; Claris
Meta	201	60	Facebook; Instagram; Reality Labs; WhatsApp
Microsoft	332	134	Azure; GitHub; LinkedIn; Xbox

Alphabet, Amazon, Apple, Meta, and Microsoft are referred to as the Big Five. They are among the most valuable public companies. In 2020, the Big Five were the second through sixth most valuable public companies in the world, behind Saudi Aramco. In August 2020, the Big Five accounted for nearly a quarter of the S&P 500. In March 2023, Apple and Microsoft accounted for 13% of the S&P 500. The Big Five are among the most prestigious employers in the world.

In the 21st century, the Big Five surpassed the market capitalization of the Big Oil companies BP, Chevron, ExxonMobil, and Shell. In 2019, Jason Whittaker stated that they also outpaced Big Media companies such as Comcast, Disney, and Warner Bros. Discovery by a factor of 10. In 2017, the Big Five had a combined value of over $3.3 trillion, and made up almost half of the Nasdaq-100.

=== Magnificent Seven ===
A group referred to as the Magnificent Seven adds Nvidia and Tesla to the Big Five based on their contributions to the S&P 500. In 2023, the Magnificent Seven accounted for approximately two-thirds of the S&P 500's gains. Over the course of the year, the Magnificent Seven delivered a groundbreaking 107% return on investment, which analysts credited to the AI boom and expected interest rate cuts by the Federal Reserve. By May 30 of that year, all of the Magnificent Seven had seen peak market caps of at least $1 trillion.

By January 2024, the Magnificent Seven accounted for 29% of the S&P 500. In February 2024, as the Magnificent Seven approached a combined valuation of $13 trillion, Deutsche Bank stated that the group exceeded the valuation of the total stock market in every country in the world except Japan, China, and the United States.

By mid-2024, Morgan Stanley stated that the Magnificent Seven accounted for 31% of the S&P 500. Some analysts expressed concern that the group's extreme concentration could trigger a downturn similar to the dot-com crash or the crash of 1929. Others argued that the companies could continue to outperform the broader market. On August 5, 2024, the Magnificent Seven briefly lost $1 trillion before quickly recovering, with the drop attributed to disappointing economic reports and growing concerns of AI overinvestment. In May 2025, FTSE Russell launched a Russell Magnificent 7 Index. In July 2026, S&P Dow Jones Indices launched an S&P 500 Magnificent 7 Index.

The nickname Magnificent Seven was coined in May 2023 by Bank of America analyst Michael Hartnett as a reference to the 1960 film of the same name, and popularized by Jim Cramer on Mad Money.

=== Noble Nine ===
The Noble Nine adds Broadcom and SpaceX to the Magnificent Seven. Broadcom surpassed both Meta and Tesla in early 2026 in terms of market capitalization, and the initial public offering of SpaceX on June 11, 2026 placed SpaceX above Broadcom, at a valuation of around $2.1 trillion.

== Companies ==
=== Big Five ===
==== Alphabet ====
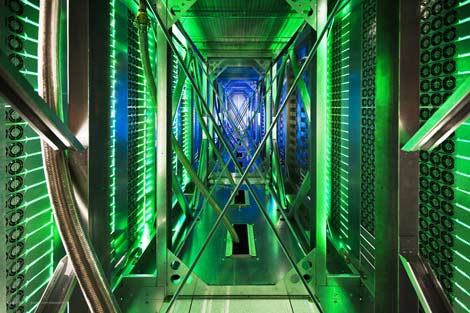
The inside of a Google data center

Alphabet is the parent company of Google, which operates several of the world's most widely used Internet services. As of 2024, Google is a major provider of online advertising (Google Ads), web search (Google Search), video sharing (YouTube), email (Gmail), web browsers (Google Chrome), web mapping (Google Maps and Waze), mobile operating systems (Android), and cloud storage (Google Drive). Its cloud computing division, Google Cloud Platform, ranks third in global market share behind Amazon Web Services and Microsoft Azure. Google and Meta are often referred to as a digital advertising duopoly. Advertising accounted for 82% of Google's revenue in 2021.

Alphabet is involved in various research and development initiatives in emerging technology fields including AI, quantum computing, and autonomous vehicles. In 2019, Google announced that its Sycamore processor had achieved quantum supremacy. In 2021, Alphabet's subsidiary Waymo launched public robotaxi services in the United States.

Alphabet reached a market capitalization of $1 trillion for the first time in January 2020, becoming the fourth U.S. company to do so.

==== Amazon ====
Amazon is one of the largest global e-commerce companies and operates several other business lines, including cloud computing, digital streaming, and AI. As of 2024, Amazon accounts for 38% of e-commerce market share in the United States. The company's Amazon Web Services (AWS) division is one of the most widely used cloud platforms and has generated the majority of Amazon's operating profit since 2014.

Amazon was the second U.S. company after Apple to reach a $1 trillion market cap, briefly doing so in 2018 and again in early 2020. It closed above that threshold for the first time in April 2020. Although Amazon's valuation fell below $1 trillion in late 2022, it recovered in 2023 and surpassed $2 trillion in June 2024.

==== Apple ====
Apple designs and sells electronics and software, including the iPhone, Mac computers, and the Apple Watch. It also offers services such as the App Store, iCloud, and Apple Music. Apple and Google form a mobile operating system duopoly, with iOS holding 27% global market share and Android 72%.

In August 2018, Apple became the first publicly traded U.S. company to reach a $1 trillion market capitalization. It reached $2 trillion in August 2020 and $3 trillion in January 2022—the first U.S. company to reach each of those milestones. Apple briefly fell below $2 trillion in January 2023 but again closed above $3 trillion later that year.

==== Meta ====
Meta Platforms owns and operates major social media and messaging services, including Facebook, Instagram, Threads, and WhatsApp. Meta generates most of its revenue through advertising, which accounted for 96.69% of total revenue in 2024.

The company entered the virtual reality market with its 2014 acquisition of Oculus, and in 2021 rebranded from Facebook, Inc. to Meta Platforms to reflect a broader focus on the metaverse, a term referring to digital environments built around virtual and augmented reality technologies. Such efforts are grouped under the umbrella term "Reality Labs" in its financial statements.

==== Microsoft ====
Microsoft develops desktop operating systems, productivity software, and enterprise and cloud services. As of 2024, its products include Microsoft Windows, the Microsoft Office suite (including Microsoft 365), and Microsoft Teams for business communication. Microsoft is also the second-largest cloud provider through Microsoft Azure, after Amazon. It also owns Xbox, one of the largest companies in the video game industry.

Microsoft reached a $1 trillion market cap in April 2019, crossed $2 trillion in June 2021, and in October 2021 briefly overtook Apple as the most valuable publicly traded U.S. company.

=== Other U.S. companies ===
Other U.S. companies are sometimes referred to as Big Tech due to their market capitalization, product reach, or cultural influence, including Adobe, AMD, Anthropic, Broadcom, Cisco, Dell, HPE, IBM, Intel, Micron, Netflix, OpenAI, Oracle, Qualcomm, Salesforce, Tesla, SpaceX, and Uber.

==== Nvidia ====
Nvidia is a software and fabless semiconductor company that designs and supplies graphics processing units (GPUs), application programming interfaces (APIs) for data science and high-performance computing, and system on a chip (SoC) units for mobile computing and automotive markets. Nvidia is the dominant supplier of hardware and software used by AI systems.

Nvidia reached a $1 trillion market capitalization in May 2023, and by late 2024, it had surpassed both Amazon and Alphabet in market value. Nvidia subsequently became the most valuable publicly traded company in the world.

==== Tesla ====
Tesla is primarily an automaker, which has led to debate over its categorization as a technology company. In 2022, Fortune included Tesla in its coverage of Big Tech, and The Washington Post likened Tesla vehicles to iPhones in terms of ecosystem integration. Critics, including analysts at Business Insider, argue Tesla should be classified strictly as an automaker. Barron's acknowledged Tesla's position as a tech company but emphasized that its business model differs from that of traditional IT companies. Tesla's occasional inclusion in Big Tech comes from its substantial investments in AI and autonomous driving, and robotics technologies. Yahoo Finance and Reuters have both noted that Tesla's stock performance has been increasingly decoupled from its vehicle sales and more closely tied to its technological ambitions.

Tesla first reached a $1 trillion market capitalization in October 2021. Its valuation declined during the 2022 stock market decline, dropping from $1.3 trillion in November 2021 to $495 billion by the end of 2022, including a 40% loss in December alone. The company again surpassed a $1 trillion valuation in November 2024, before a major decline throughout the first quarter of 2025, largely attributed to political criticism of CEO Elon Musk and his involvement in the second Trump administration.

=== Asian companies ===
The large Chinese tech companies Baidu, Alibaba, Tencent, and Xiaomi, collectively referred to as BATX, have also been referred to as Big Tech. The following Asian companies have also been referred to as Big Tech:

- China: BYD, ByteDance, DJI, Geely, Huawei, JD.com, Lenovo, Meituan, NetEase, Pinduoduo, SMIC
- India: Cognizant, Flipkart, HCLTech, Infosys, Meesho, Tata Consultancy Services, Tech Mahindra, Wipro
- Japan: Fujitsu, Hitachi, LYC, Mitsubishi, Panasonic, Rakuten, Sony, Toshiba
- Singapore: Grab, Sea
- South Korea: LG, Naver, Samsung, SK
- Taiwan: ASE Group, Foxconn, MediaTek, Pegatron, Quanta Computers, TSMC, Wistron
- Other countries: Ayala (Philippines), Goto (Indonesia)

== Causes ==
Nikos Smyrnaios argued in 2016 that four phenomena allowed Big Tech to emerge: technological convergence, deregulation, globalization, and financialization. He argued that people like Nicholas Negroponte promoted technological convergence and made an Internet oligopoly appear desirable. The complexity of IT made competition law ineffective, resulting in industry self-regulation. Globalization allowed Big Tech companies to minimize their tax burden and pay foreign workers lower wages. Without regulation, Big Tech earned big profits: in 2014, Google, Apple, and Facebook earned over 20% profit margins.

=== Innovation ===
Critics have alleged that Section 230 of the Communications Decency Act allowed Big Tech to evade responsibility for user-generated content. It states, "No provider or user of an interactive computer service shall be treated as the publisher or speaker of any information provided by another information content provider." Section 230 has been called "the twenty-six words that created the Internet." Without the legal requirement for content moderation, online services could innovate freely and achieved rapid growth in the early days of the Internet.

According to journalist Alexis Madrigal, the innovation that initially characterized Silicon Valley has been replaced by a strategy of growth through acquisitions. For example, Apple started in 1976 as an engineering-focused startup company, and quickly claimed market share from less innovative competitors like Xerox. The tech giants made timely investments in personal computers, websites, e-commerce, mobile devices, social media, and cloud computing, and rank highly on the list of companies by research and development spending. However, large companies tend to focus on operational efficiency instead of new product development.

Legal scholar Tim Wu speculated that Big Tech acquisitions could create "kill zones" that stifle competition by taking potential competitors out of the marketplace. For example, Facebook's acquisition of Instagram prevented Instagram from becoming an independent platform similar to Facebook. On the other hand, Wu stated that Microsoft's concentration of market power created a platform for new kinds of innovation.

According to the Information Technology and Innovation Foundation, "Virtually all so-called killer acquisitions represent the technologies and capabilities the companies view as critical to their competitiveness. If they purchase a company innovating within this zone, they are far more likely to develop its innovation than to bury it. In doing so, they often make the technology available faster and to more people than would otherwise be possible. If companies are prevented from making acquisitions, they are more likely to copy the products or develop alternative innovations than they are to ignore them. Assuming incumbents don't violate intellectual property laws, this type of competition is both legal and socially beneficial."

Competition between cloud platforms including Amazon Web Services, Microsoft Azure, and Google Cloud Platform contributed to open-source software infrastructure including LLVM and the Linux kernel. The "cloud wars" also caused Big Tech companies to invest in data centers and undersea cables. The operational efficiency of Big Tech technology stacks means startup companies typically must use Big Tech infrastructure instead of building their own.

=== Business strategy ===
Nikos Smyrnaios argued in 2016 that Big Tech companies concentrate power by vertically integrating data centers, Internet connectivity, computer hardware (including smartphones), operating systems, applications (including Web browsers), and online services. He also argued that they concentrate power by horizontally integrating different services such as email, instant messaging, online searching, downloading, and streaming across platforms. For example, Google and Microsoft pay for their search engines to be included with Apple's iPhone. According to The Economist, "Network and scale effects mean that size begets size, while data can act as a barrier to entry."

== Criticism ==
According to The Globe and Mail, both left-wing and right-wing politicians have criticized Big Tech. Progressives have alleged "runaway profit-taking and concentration of wealth," and conservatives have alleged "liberal bias." According to The New York Times, "The left generally argues that companies like Facebook and Twitter aren't doing enough to root out misinformation, extremism and hate on their platforms, while the right insists that tech companies are going so overboard in their content decisions that they're suppressing conservative political views." According to The Hill, libertarians oppose government regulation of Big Tech due to their support for laissez-faire economics.

Scott Galloway said Big Tech companies "avoid taxes, invade privacy, and destroy jobs." Nikos Smyrnaios described Big Tech as an oligopoly that dominates the information technology market through anti-competitive practices, ever-increasing economic power, and intellectual property. Smyrnaios argued that the current situation is the result of deregulation, globalization, and the failure of politicians to understand and respond to developments in technology. Smyrnaios recommended developing academic analysis of the political economy of the Internet to understand the methods of domination and to criticize these methods to encourage opposition to that domination.

Some conspiracy theorists believe Big Tech is a corporate front for a group of "interconnected and overlapping" ideologies referred to as TESCREAL (Transhumanism, Extropianism, Singularitarianism, Cosmism, Rationalism, Effective Altruism, and Longtermism). TESCREAL is believed to use the threat of human extinction to justify risky investments without sufficient government oversight.

=== Censorship ===
Big Tech companies have faced political censorship. China banned Google in 2010 because Google refused to censor search results critical of the Chinese Communist Party. Meta and X have been banned in China since 2009. In India, Facebook and Twitter were accused of censorship during the 2020–2021 Indian farmers' protest. The Wall Street Journal stated that Facebook only restricted content criticizing the Indian government, even if government supporters posted false statements.

In 2021, Alexei Navalny criticized Apple and Google for complying with a Russian government order to ban the Smart Voting app. On February 24, 2022, the Russian invasion of Ukraine began. In March 2022, Russia blocked Facebook and Twitter because of "disinformation" and "fake news." On March 21, 2022, Russia recognized Meta as an "extremist organization," making Meta the first public company recognized as extremist in Russia. Microsoft's LinkedIn has been blocked in Russia since 2016.

In the United States, conservatives and Republican politicians frequently allege censorship of their viewpoints and ideas, however, research has not supported the allegation that social media companies are biased against conservative viewpoints. The practice of banning hate speech has also received criticism from conservatives. Following the 2020 United States presidential election, CNN described a "yearslong intimidation campaign led by Republican attorneys general and state and federal lawmakers" to make social media companies "platform falsehoods and hate speech" and thwart those "working to study or limit the spread" of it. According to a February 2021 report by New York University researchers, conservative claims of social media censorship could be considered disinformation and false. The report also recommended that social media platforms should increase their transparency to push back against claims of censorship. Republican-introduced bills in many states have allowed for civil lawsuits against social media companies over perceived "censorship" of posts, especially those related to politics or religion. During the 2024 United States presidential election, The New York Times described social media as being predominantly right-leaning despite claims of conservative censorship, and the Pew Research Center found that more social media influencers leaned conservative (27%) than liberal (21%).

In July 2020, the United States House Judiciary Subcommittee on Antitrust, Commercial and Administrative Law interviewed the CEOs of Alphabet, Amazon, Apple, and Facebook. During the hearings, some members of Congress alleged bias against conservatives on social media. Matt Gaetz protested Amazon's ban on donations to hate groups, stating that Jeff Bezos should "divorce from the SPLC."

On November 5, 2020, President Donald Trump alleged "historic election interference from big money, big media, and big tech." Conservative newspaper The Washington Times criticized Trump's claims as lacking evidence. During Trump's speech that incited the January 6 United States Capitol attack, he accused Big Tech of rigging the 2020 election and promised to "get rid of" Section 230. According to Trump, "They rigged it like they have never rigged an election before, and by the way, last night, they didn't do a bad job either." After Trump's Twitter account was suspended, German Chancellor Angela Merkel's chief spokesman Steffen Seibert noted that Merkel found Twitter's halt of Trump's account "problematic," adding that legislators, not private companies, should decide on any necessary curbs to free expression if hate speech incites violence.

Conservatives argued that Facebook and Twitter limiting the spread of the Hunter Biden laptop controversy "proves Big Tech's bias." In some cases, Big Tech platforms reversed actions perceived as censorship. The YouTube channel Right Wing Watch was banned for showing far-right content to expose extreme views, but the channel was restored after viewer backlash. Human Rights Watch stated that excessive content removal, especially on Facebook, meant losing evidence of human rights abuses.

In 2024, Republican members of the House of Representatives released a report alleging that the Biden administration privately urged social media platforms to remove posts criticizing the government. The posts in question often involved "humorous or satirical content." Although such material is constitutionally protected by the First Amendment, several employees confessed that they changed content moderation policies in response to political pressure. At one point, Democratic officials threatened Meta CEO Mark Zuckerberg with contempt of Congress for refusing to censor Facebook or deplatform users for posting right-wing memes. Zuckerberg stated in an internal email, "When we compromise our standards due to pressure from an administration in either direction, we'll often regret it later." The report's conclusion stated, "The Constitution is not suspended in times of crisis."

Facebook has also been accused of censoring left-wing opinions. Facebook removed ads by Democratic senator Elizabeth Warren, who advocated breaking up Facebook. Warren accused the company of having the "ability to shut down a debate" and called for "a social media marketplace that isn't dominated by a single censor."

In 2025, Facebook, X, YouTube, and other social media platforms agreed to address online hate speech by enforcing a revised code of conduct aligned with European Commission rules. Henna Virkkunen, the EU tech commissioner, stated that Europe has zero tolerance for hate speech, whether online or offline. She approved the tech companies' commitment to enforcing the code of conduct mandated by the Digital Services Act (DSA).

=== Disinformation ===
Following Russian interference in the 2016 United States elections, Facebook was criticized for failing to curb disinformation. In the Facebook–Cambridge Analytica data scandal, Facebook users were targeted for political propaganda based on their online activity, which Facebook monitored and shared without consent. In 2019, a Senate Intelligence Committee report criticized Facebook and Twitter for failing to stop the spread of misinformation. In response to criticism of their handling of misinformation and disinformation during the 2016 election, Big Tech companies cracked down on fake accounts and trolling.

During the COVID-19 pandemic, Big Tech was criticized for allowing COVID-19 misinformation. According to Representatives Frank Pallone, Mike Doyle, and Jan Schakowsky, "Industry self-regulation has failed. We must begin the work of changing incentives driving social media companies to allow and even promote misinformation and disinformation." President Joe Biden criticized Facebook for allowing anti-vaccine activism. Imran Ahmed, CEO of the Center for Countering Digital Hate, said, "While they fail to take action, lives are being lost." In response to the criticism, Big Tech companies deleted numerous social media accounts and banned health-related false advertising. Human Rights Watch has criticized Big Tech, primarily Facebook, for allowing misinformation to spread in developing countries.

=== Privacy concerns ===
In September 2024, the Federal Trade Commission (FTC) released a report summarizing company responses from Amazon, Facebook, YouTube, Twitter, Snap, ByteDance, Discord, Reddit, and WhatsApp to orders made by the agency pursuant to Section 6(b) of the Federal Trade Commission Act of 1914 to provide information about user and non-user data collection (including of children and teenagers) and data use by the companies that found that the user and non-user data practices of the companies made users and non-users vulnerable to identity theft, stalking, unlawful discrimination, emotional distress and mental health issues, social stigma, and reputational harm. Based upon the report's findings, the FTC concluded that industry self-regulation had failed and recommended that Congress pass a comprehensive data privacy law.

=== Environmental impact ===
The environmental impact of Big Tech is a phenomenon in which many aspects of Big Tech contribute to negative impacts on the environment, including climate change. In the big data age, technologists and people in general find it valuable to view emerging technologies with a critical lens, one of which is geared toward the environment. As these emerging technologies become more popular, they consider the extent at which they contribute to changes in the environment and whether they are inherently positive or negative.

A 2022 report from Greenpeace and Stand.earth highlights the technology sector's rapid growth, driving a significant increase in electricity consumption, projected to rise by over 60% between 2020 and 2030. This increase in energy usage is coupled with a rise in carbon emissions attributed to the sector's heavy dependence on fossil fuels. While some Big Tech firms have committed to transitioning to 100% renewable energy for their operations, this commitment has not yet extended to their supply chains. Seven out of ten ranked consumer electronics brands have committed to achieve 100% renewable energy across their own operations by 2030, with Apple, Google, and Microsoft already achieving this goal. In 2023, Big Tech accounted for approximately 4% of global greenhouse gas emissions, surpassing those of the aviation industry. Google and Microsoft each consumed 24 TWh of electricity in 2023, more than countries such as Iceland, Ghana, the Dominican Republic, or Tunisia.

=== Reuse of copyrighted content ===
On May 9, 2019, the Parliament of France passed a law intended to force Big Tech to pay publishers for the reuse of substantial amounts of copyrighted content (related rights). The law is aimed at implementing Article 15 of the Directive on Copyright in the Digital Single Market of the European Union.

=== Human rights ===
In September 2025, the AP reported that U.S. companies have developed technology for mass surveillance, Internet censorship, and human rights abuses in China through partnerships with Chinese law enforcement, the Chinese military, and Chinese-owned defense contractors. The companies identified by the investigation stated that they were compliant with all applicable laws.

== Antitrust efforts ==
Concerns over monopolistic practices have led to antitrust investigations in Big Tech from both United States and European Union regulatory agencies. These investigations have raised concerns around Big Tech on privacy, market power, freedom of speech, national security, and law enforcement. In 2019, John Naughton wrote in The Guardian, "It's almost impossible to function without the big five tech giants."

=== United States ===
Under United States antitrust law, the consumer welfare standard assumes that large companies are not automatically harmful. Antitrust enforcement generally aims to prevent harm to consumers. According to some policy analysts, Big Tech innovation benefits consumers. Big Tech CEOs have consistently opposed antitrust regulation. Antitrust investigations of Big Tech began in the late 1990s, leading to the first major case against Big Tech in 2001, when the U.S. government accused Microsoft of illegally maintaining its monopoly position in the PC market.

Microsoft imposed legal and technical restrictions on PC manufacturers and users preventing them from uninstalling Internet Explorer and using Netscape or Java. The district court ruled that Microsoft's actions constituted monopolization under the Sherman Antitrust Act, and the U.S. Court of Appeals for the D.C. Circuit affirmed most of the district court's judgments. The Department of Justice (DOJ) announced on September 6, 2001, that it would not seek to break up Microsoft, and would instead seek a lesser penalty if Microsoft agreed to share its APIs with third-party companies and appoint a three-person panel with access to Microsoft's systems, records, and source code for five years. On November 1, 2002, Judge Kollar-Kotelly accepted most of the proposed settlement, and on June 30, 2004, the U.S. appeals court unanimously approved the settlement.

In the late 2010s, Big Tech was investigated by the DOJ and Federal Trade Commission (FTC) for anticompetitive mergers and acquisitions. Some Democratic presidential candidates proposed breaking up Big Tech or regulating tech companies as utilities. FTC chairman Joseph Simons said, "The role of technology in the economy and in our lives grows more important every day...As I've noted in the past, it makes sense for us to closely examine technology markets to ensure consumers benefit from free and fair competition." In 2017, Elizabeth Warren criticized Big Tech for offering free services to remain more popular than the competition. The United States House Judiciary Subcommittee on Antitrust, Commercial and Administrative Law investigated Big Tech in June 2020, and published a report in January 2021 concluding that Amazon, Apple, Google, and Meta operated in an anticompetitive manner.

On June 24, 2021, the United States House Judiciary Subcommittee on Antitrust, Commercial and Administrative Law held hearings on proposed Big Tech regulations. Pramila Jayapal introduced HR 3825, The Ending Platform Monopolies Act, which passed the committee. The bill proposed prohibiting platform owners from offering products and services on the platforms they own. For example, in 2010, Amazon attempted to acquire Diapers.com. When Diapers.com rejected Amazon's proposal, Amazon started selling diapers at a loss. Facing unprofitability, Diapers.com agreed to let Amazon buy the company even though Walmart was willing to pay more. The committee voted that the reason for Big Tech monopolies is because of the consumer welfare standard, a legal doctrine stating that if the consumer benefits from corporate actions, those actions are generally legal. FTC chairwoman Lina Khan expressed a different view in her publication "Amazon's Antitrust Paradox."

On July 9, 2021, President Joe Biden signed Executive Order 14036, "Promoting Competition in the American Economy," a sweeping array of initiatives across the executive branch. The order established an executive branch-wide policy to more thoroughly scrutinize mergers involving Big Tech companies, with focus on the acquisition of new, potentially disruptive technology from smaller companies by the larger companies. The order also instructed the FTC to establish rules related to the use of data collection by Big Tech companies for promoting their own services. In June 2024, the DOJ and FTC opened an investigation into Microsoft, Nvidia, and OpenAI regarding their dominance in artificial intelligence. In August 2024, District of Columbia U.S. District Court Judge Amit Mehta ruled that Google held a monopoly in online search and text advertising in violation of Section 2 of the Sherman Antitrust Act. In April 2025, Eastern Virginia U.S. District Court Judge Leonie Brinkema ruled that Google held a monopoly in advertising technology in violation of Sections 1 and 2 of the Sherman Antitrust Act. Google issued press releases in response announcing that the company would appeal the rulings. In November 2025, District of Columbia U.S. District Court Judge James Boasberg ruled that Meta Platforms did not hold a monopoly in the social networking service market.

=== European Union ===
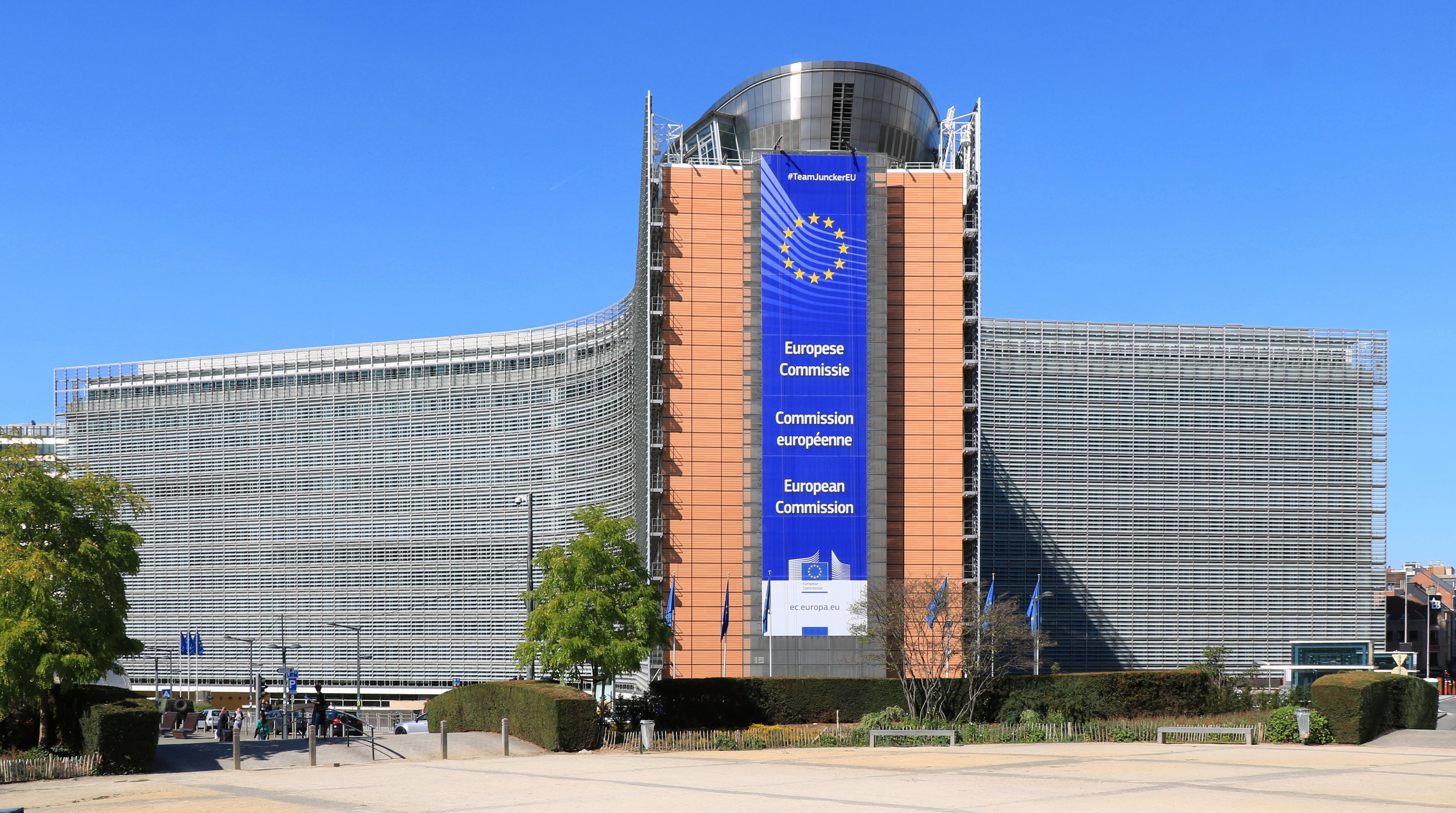
The European Commission, which has imposed sanctions on several of the high-tech giants

In June 2020, the European Union opened two investigations into Apple. The first investigation focused on whether Apple uses market dominance to stifle competition in music and book streaming. The second investigation focused on Apple Pay. Apple limits the use of the iPhone's NFC technology by financial institutions, including banks.

According to former European Commissioner for Competition Margrethe Vestager, fines are insufficient to deter anticompetitive practices. Vestager stated, "Fines are not doing the trick. And fines are not enough because fines are a punishment for illegal behaviour in the past. What is also in our decision is that you have to change for the future. You have to stop what you're doing."

In September 2021, the United States and European Union began negotiating a joint approach to Big Tech regulation. The European Parliament passed the Digital Markets Act (DMA) in March 2022 to restrict data collection from European users, require social media interoperability, and allow alternative app stores and payment systems for Apple and Google smartphones. The EU also passed the Digital Services Act (DSA) in April 2022, which requires tech companies to take down hate speech and child sexual abuse, and ban advertising targeting gender, race, religion, and childhood. Both the Digital Markets Act and Digital Services Act were enacted by the EU in July 2022. The EU defined Alphabet, Amazon, Apple, ByteDance, Meta, and Microsoft as "gatekeepers" under the DMA in September 2023, and required them to comply by March 2024. On June 24, 2024, the European Union charged Apple with breaching the Digital Markets Act, potentially resulting in a significant fine. On April 23, 2025, the Commission found Apple and Meta in breach of the Digital Markets act, and fined Apple and Meta with €500 million and €200 million respectively. The EU is also investigating Apple's new terms and fees for app developers, criticizing the company's restrictions and handling of AI-powered features in the EU.

== Alternatives ==
Alt-tech is a collection of social networking services and Internet service providers popular among the alt-right, far-right, and others who espouse extremism or fringe theories, typically because they employ looser content moderation than mainstream platforms. The term "alt-tech" is a portmanteau of "alt-right" and "Big Tech."

The fediverse is a collection of federated social networking services that can communicate with each other even if they are controlled independently. Users of different websites can send and receive status updates and multimedia files across the network. The term "fediverse" is a portmanteau of "federation" and "universe."

Web3 (also known as Web 3.0) is an idea for a new iteration of the World Wide Web which incorporates concepts such as decentralization, blockchain technologies, and token-based economics. Some technologists and journalists have contrasted it with Web 2.0, in which they claim user-generated content is controlled by a small group of companies referred to as Big Tech.

The dark web is the World Wide Web content that exists on darknets (overlay networks) that use the Internet, but require specific software, configurations, or authorization to access. Through the dark web, private computer networks can communicate and conduct business anonymously without divulging identifying information, such as a user's location. The dark web forms a small part of the deep web, the part of the web not indexed by web search engines, although sometimes the term deep web is mistakenly used to refer specifically to the dark web.

=== Little Tech ===
Some critics have contrasted Big Tech with startup culture, which they semi-humorously refer to as Little Tech. Little Tech has attracted attention for technical innovation and encouraging digital wellbeing. Advocates like Andreessen Horowitz argue that Little Tech is threatened by anticompetitive policies. Little Tech advocates emphasize the importance of investing in startup companies to support technological progress. However, critics differ on the impact of Little Tech and the need for governments to support startup companies. Some critics argue that the Little Tech agenda is a wish list for venture capitalists that seeks preferential treatment for risky investments rather than accelerating innovation. Despite these criticisms, Little Tech companies have demonstrated the ability to solve problems that might be too specific for Big Tech companies to be interested in. Little Tech companies often develop custom solutions for local governments, enhancing public services and promoting digital transformation. Some Little Tech initiatives aim to educate and empower users, such as by helping teenagers understand technology. Organizations like the American Innovators Network support the Little Tech agenda by offering workshops and consultations.

== See also ==
- AI boom
- BATX
- Criticism of Amazon
- Criticism of Apple Inc.
- Criticism of Facebook
- Criticism of Google
  - DeGoogle
  - Googlization
- Criticism of Microsoft
- Criticism of Tesla, Inc.
- Criticism of technology
- Enshittification
- History of technology
- Internet addiction disorder
- Nifty Fifty
- Platform economy
- Privacy concerns with social networking services
- Surveillance capitalism
- Tech–industrial complex
- Technocapitalism
- Technology and society
- United States antitrust law
  - Barriers to entry
  - Imperfect competition
  - Market concentration (Duopoly/Oligopoly)
  - Market power
  - Monopolistic competition
  - Monopoly (Natural/Coercive)
- Web3
