= Big Tech (India) =

Largest technology companies in India

Big Tech in India, also known as the Indian IT Giants, are the largest companies in the Indian information technology industry. The definition primarily includes Tata Consultancy Services, Infosys, HCLTech, and Wipro, along with one or both of Cognizant and Tech Mahindra. They are referred to in the media as "Big Six" or "Big Five", and with acronyms such as TWITCH and WITCH.

The companies are among the dominant players in the global delivery model, providing IT consulting, outsourcing and offshore software development to Fortune Global 500 corporations and government entities. All six companies feature among the 20 largest employers in India. Five of them are part of the NIFTY 50 benchmark index of most valuable publicly listed companies, while the sixth, Cognizant, is part of the Nasdaq-100.

== Background ==
In the 2000s, Gartner coined the acronym SWITCH, to refer to the six largest Indian IT companies Satyam, Wipro, Infosys, TCS, Cognizant and HCL. This acronym and the term "Big Six" subsequently found wide usage in forecast reports of other analysts and news media. Following Satyam's liquidation and business transfer to Tech Mahindra, the acronym shortened to WITCH, while several outlets started using TWITCH by replacing Satyam with Tech Mahindra.

Even after Cognizant shifted its headquarters from India to the United States, analysts have continued to refer to it as an Indian-heritage company, as a large majority of its workforce (about three-fourths) remains in India like its India-based peers. Some definitions in the Indian stock market context omit Cognizant from the grouping because it is not listed on the Indian exchanges.

== Members ==
The table below lists companies that have been frequently included in the definition, sorted by market capitalization.

Rank	Company name	Market capitalization (15 October 2026)	Revenue (FY 2025–26)
1	Tata Consultancy Services	₹833,933 crore (US$87 billion)	₹267,021 crore (US$28 billion)
2	Infosys	₹441,540 crore (US$46 billion)	₹178,650 crore (US$19 billion)
3	HCLTech	₹360,103 crore (US$37 billion)	₹130,144 crore (US$14 billion)
4	Cognizant	US$26.9 billion	US$21.1 billion
5	Wipro	₹169,302 crore (US$18 billion)	₹92,620 crore (US$9.6 billion)
6	Tech Mahindra	₹154,395 crore (US$16 billion)	₹56,815 crore (US$5.9 billion)

== See also ==
- Other "Big" industry terms:
  - Big Tech United States
  - Big Four accounting firms
  - Big Three (automobile manufacturers)
  - Big Three (management consultancies)
  - BATX
- List of Indian IT companies
- Information technology in India
