= Arattai =

Indian Messaging service

- Developer: Zoho Corporation
- Release: January 2021; 5 years ago

Stable release(s)
- Android: 1.57.1 / October 16, 2026; 11 days ago
- iOS: 1.17.13 / September 22, 2025; 13 months ago
- Operating system: Android; iOS; Windows; macOS; Linux; watchOS
- Type: Voice over IP (VoIP); Instant messaging; Video chat
- Website: www.arattai.in

Arattai Messenger (or simply Arattai) is an Indian encrypted messaging service for instant messaging, voice calls, and video calls, developed by Zoho Corporation. The name Arattai means "chat" or "conversation" in Tamil. The app was soft-launched in January 2021. The app saw a sharp surge in downloads in September 2025, partially fueled by endorsements from Indian government officials.

== History ==
Arattai was initially tested internally among Zoho employees before being released publicly in early 2021. The launch coincided with a surge in interest for privacy-focused and messaging services, triggered by concerns over WhatsApp's updated terms of service.

In September 2025, Arattai experienced a major surge in adoption, with daily sign-ups reportedly increasing 100-fold, from around 3,000 to more than 350,000 in three days. The surge in downloads was attributed to Zoho products being promoted by Indian government officials as part of their Make in India push for homegrown alternatives to foreign‐owned apps, amid deteriorating India–US relations. The growth temporarily strained Zoho's infrastructure, prompting rapid scaling of servers and capacity expansion. During the same period, the app reached the top position in Apple's App Store charts for the "Social Networking" category in India. The app dropped from the top ranking in late October 2025.

== Features ==
=== Messaging and language support ===
Arattai supports text and voice messages in regional Indian languages, including Tamil, Kannada, Odia and Telugu. The app is designed to run on low-memory phones and slow 2G/3G networks.

=== Privacy and Security ===
Arattai direct and group chats and calls are end-to-end encrypted. Encryption for direct chats began rolling out in November 2025 and for the group chat E2E they rolled out an update in September 2026. Arattai states that users data is stored in india and that it shows no ads and does not share data with third parties.

=== File sharing and stories ===
Arattai supports file sharing upto 1 GB.

== Reception ==
At launch, Arattai was positioned as a potential domestic rival to WhatsApp in India, but analysts noted that it faced challenges with and network effect. Critics pointed to occasional sync delays.

== See also ==
- Jami – Distributed multimedia communications platform
- Signal – Privacy-focused encrypted messaging app
- Telegram – Cross-platform instant messaging service
