= Environmental impact of Big Tech =

The environmental impact of Big Tech is a phenomenon in which many aspects of Big Tech contribute to negative impacts on the environment, including climate change. In the big data age, technologists and people in general find it valuable to view emerging technologies with a critical lens, one of which is geared toward the environment. As these emerging technologies become more popular, they consider the extent at which they contribute to changes in the environment and whether they are inherently positive or negative.

A 2022 report from Greenpeace and Stand.earth highlights the technology sector's rapid growth, driving a significant increase in electricity consumption, projected to rise by over 60% between 2020 and 2030. This increase in energy usage is coupled with a rise in carbon emissions attributed to the sector's heavy dependence on fossil fuels. While some Big Tech firms have committed to transitioning to 100% renewable energy for their operations, this commitment has not yet extended to their supply chains. Seven out of ten ranked consumer electronics brands have committed to achieve 100% renewable energy across their own operations by 2030, with Apple, Google, and Microsoft already achieving this goal. In 2023, Big Tech accounted for approximately 4% of global greenhouse gas emissions, surpassing those of the aviation industry. Google and Microsoft each consumed 24 TWh of electricity in 2023, more than countries such as Iceland, Ghana, the Dominican Republic, or Tunisia.

== Background ==
Big tech is a term commonly used to refer to largely growing technologies and companies. Google, Apple, Amazon, Microsoft, Netflix are notably some of the largest companies. One area of concern that has caught the eye of many people who observe these technologies is the carbon footprint that their data centers leave as well as their supply chain carbon emissions. Because these technologies continue to grow, so do the effect they have on the climate and society which has prompted scientists to take a further look into the exact effect that they are making.

This has influenced the area of green computing which aims to promote sustainability within the technology industry. Big tech companies have been in competition to reduce network lag and ensure financial success. Because of this, they seek to have the fastest internet speeds and largest repositories of data to provide their users with efficient and personalized experiences in order to create engagement. For example, in 2020, Facebook announced that they would invest in undersea cables in Latin America and sub-Saharan Africa to improve internet speeds.

In addition, many companies similarly expand their resources to use large data centers, undersea cables, and other technological extensions to increase the quality of their products. Users benefit from these features, but they also leave an effect on the world's climate.

== Carbon emissions ==
In 2021, the big technology sector produced between 2–3% of the world's carbon emissions, according to the UN's environment program. This number is comparable to global aviation. A source of this is that these companies, such as Google and Meta who are large contributors, are very reliant on carbon-intensive supply chains due to their enterprises being located in countries reliant on fossil fuels. Some example of such countries very dependent on fossil fuels are Oman, Qatar, Kuwait, Saudi Arabia, and Brunei Darussalam.

Electronics Hub, an organization dedicated to providing electronics knowledge for free for electronics enthusiasts, carried out a study on this using publicly available ESG (Environment, Social, and Governance) and CSR (Corporate Social Responsibility) reports to find the total direct and indirect carbon emissions figures for 100 of the largest technology companies, ranking them from highest to lowest polluting within the industry. They found that Samsung has the largest carbon footprint of any major company in tech. Specifically, they emit 20.1 million metric tons of CO_{2} per year. Amazon emits the most of the "Big Five" tech companies, with 16.2 million metric tons of CO_{2} produced each year. Per employee, Taiwanese semiconductor manufacturer TSMC emits the most, with 209.4 metric tons of CO_{2} produced for every member of their staff. Onsemi, a US based semiconductor firm, produces the most carbon relative to their earnings, with 405.5 metric tons of CO_{2} produced for every one million dollars in revenue.

== Data centers and the cloud ==
The cloud is a term used by many of these big tech companies as a virtual space in which a lot of data is kept. The virtual term intuitively has made it seem that the cloud is not something physical that can harm the earth. However, recent studies have shown that the "cloud" is kept alive by very large energy-consuming data centers around the world that do have an impact on climate. Based on the U.S. electric metric, storing 100 GB of data in the cloud every year would produce 0.2 tons of CO_{2}.

As more and more operations are managed in the cloud, the energy required to process and perform those operations is generated by fossil fuels. Studies have shown that over 2700 colocation centers across the US consume vast amounts of electricity and water while providing few human jobs required for operation. Many of these locations are also susceptible to drought such as Dallas and the Bay Area. Anywhere from 3-5 million gallons of water per day is required to provide energy that allows the centers to operate. This water would be enough for 30,000–50,000 people.

Data from the International Energy Agency shows that centers use 200 TWh (one trillion watt hours) of electricity and generate 3.5% of the global greenhouse gas (GHG) emissions per year. There are three factors that influence the carbon footprint of these data centers.

1. Data centers require electricity to run servers. However, the location of the data center impacts how much emissions are generated by electricity use. Data centers located in areas that have adapted to green power will have a much lower carbon footprint than those located in areas that haven't.
2. Data centers need water to cool the servers and also can create large water run off. Studies have shown that data centers use up to 5 million gallons of water per day.
3. Lifespan of equipment determines the frequency of replacements. Every hardware replacement in the colocation center generates a carbon footprint for its sourcing, production, and transportation.

== Locations ==
Number of Data Centers in Various Areas
Country	Number of Data Centers
US	2701
Germany	487
UK	456
China	443
Canada	328
Australia	287
Netherlands	281
France	264
Japan	207
Russia	172
Mexico	153
Brazil	150
India	138
Poland	136
Italy	131

The energy consumption of data centers is rising exponentially. Data from the United States Data Center Energy Usage Report shows that in 2014, data centers in the U.S. used around 70 billion kWh – which is 1.8% of the nation's total electricity consumption. The report also shows that the data center electricity use increased by around 4% from 2010 to 2014, and energy use is expected to increase. These estimates claimed that the US data centers are expected to use 73 billion kWh in the 2020s. Data from Goldman Sachs forecast a 15% compound annual growth rate (CAGR) in data center power demand from 2023–2030. This increase in demand would cause data centers to make up 8% of total US power demand by 2030.

== Devices and e-waste ==
Data centers, applications, and architectures are often targeted when analyzing the environmental effect of big tech. However, another substantial source are devices. There are nearly 700 million old "hibernating" mobile phones in Europe alone which amounts to 14,920 tons of gold, silver, copper, palladium, cobalt and lithium. E-waste is also a big source of climate impact. When broken or unwanted electronic items are dumped into landfills, toxic substances such as lead and mercury can leach into soil and water. Another consideration is that electronics also contain valuable non-renewable resources such as gold, silver, copper, platinum, aluminum and cobalt. Because these are thrown away with no attempt of recycling, precious materials are also wasted.

The United Nations leads the Global E-waste Statistics Partnership which tracks the amount of e-waste in the world. It categorizes e-waste into: temperature-exchange equipment (refrigerators, air conditioners), screens and monitors, lamps, large equipment (washing machines, copiers), small equipment (cameras, smart speakers), and small IT and telecommunications and equipment (phones, routers).

Currently, the amount of e-waste is incalculable due to the fact that it is undocumented. Due to the short life cycles of electronics, we need to replace them frequently. However, they are rarely disposed in a way that would limit its impact on the environment.

Manufacturers also discourage repairing devices by consumers or third parties due to privacy and safety. Even if repair were easy and accessible, people would still be likely to move on to a new device instead of fixing the one they have. The right to repair could potentially fix the problem of e-waste.

== Big tech initiatives ==
Some of the largest tech companies have vowed to combat climate change. Some have made plans to reach net-zero carbon emissions. Amazon has committed to net-zero carbon emissions across its operations by 2040, a goal it says it is pursuing through investment in carbon-free energy sources, broader sustainability initiatives, and partnerships with other organizations. As of 2025, the company reports that it has matched 100% of its electricity consumption with renewable energy sources for three consecutive years. Along with Amazon, Apple, Dell, Google, HP, Microsoft, and Nvidia have claimed to reduce their greenhouse gas (GHG) emissions by 2030.

=== Decarbonization and energy transition plan ===
Companies have instituted plans to curtail absolute GHG emissions within their supply chains. They have also claimed that they will use renewable energy in self-operated stores and facilities.

=== Supply chain engagement ===
Companies have identified the importance of supplier engagement in achieving emission reduction goals. Brands have taken measures to intervene with supplies by providing training, incentives and other financial support. These brands help suppliers set climate targets.

=== Energy transition ===
Companies are seeking to procure renewable energy for use in their supply chains. Some companies such as Apple and Google have reported joining the Asia Clean Energy Coalition.

=== Reducing e-waste ===
Companies have ideated designing products so that precious metals are easier to extract as well as creating an "eco-label" system. Companies such as Dell have suggested that half of the materials it uses will be "recycled or renewable" by 2030. Growth in electronic and IT spaces has created a growing danger of tech waste, which usually has toxic materials and harms both human and environmental health, these harms show the need for e waste policies. In India,, about 1.3 million tons of e-waste is produced each year. Currently, there is no specific legislation dedicated to e-waste, however, a large portion of the waste is managed by the unorganized sector using unsafe methods that cause pollution and health hazards. The government has taken steps towards better managing the amount of waste produced like the formation of a National Working Group and CPCB workshops, but due to the lack of reliable data and reliance on informal recycling networks, major obstacles remain.

=== Creating a circular economy ===
The circular electronics partnership is a group of companies that have committed to creating a circular economy. A circular "operating system" allows a product to be collected at the end of life, recovered through any of the R-strategies, and then circulated back into the economy. The Circular Electronics Partnership has gathered to define what a circular product means and how to accomplish it with the goal of tackling e-waste. Their roadmap consists of:

1. Design for circularity
2. Drive demand for circular products and services
3. Scale responsible business models
4. Increase official collection rate
5. Aggregate for reuse and recycling
6. Scale secondary material markets

By motivating consumers to buy back products as well as purchase circular products, less electronics will be dumped into landfills. Leaders from many different companies have come together to design this roadmap. The roadmap sets objectives for key areas of the electronics value chain, from design to sourcing and manufacturing through to reverse logistics and recycling. This is the first time experts, business leaders and global organizations will set a vision and roadmap committing to a circular economy for electronics by 2030 and co-design solutions around this topic. This initiative is led by the World Business Council for Sustainable Development and the World Economic Forum.

== Outside lobbying ==
Platforms can reach large and diverse audiences from their apps and websites, which gives them advantages over traditional interest groups when trying to mobilize the public; this is how they engage in outside lobbying. Though outside lobbying platforms attempt to raise the salience of regulatory proposals, they do this by posting banners, links and targeted messages in order to shape how the issues are framed. For example, framing regulation as censorship. In German speaking countries, platform led movements helped shift public debate and signal potential electoral cost to legislators. However, despite large public promises on average, major tech firms only invest a small fraction of their lobbying budget into climate change policies. The five largest tech companies collectively spent about 4 percent of their lobbying budget for positive climate related issues. Although large tech companies routinely commit themselves to large scale environmental changes, companies like Apple associate with organizations like BusinessEurope known for backing efforts to weaken EU greenhouse gas emissions regulations, contradicting their environmental commitments.
