= YouTube and privacy =

Since its founding in 2005, the American video-sharing website YouTube has been faced with a growing number of privacy issues, including allegations that it allows users to upload unauthorized copyrighted material and allows personal information from young children to be collected without their parents' consent.

In September 2024, the Federal Trade Commission released a report summarizing nine company responses (including from YouTube) to orders made by the agency pursuant to Section 6(b) of the Federal Trade Commission Act of 1914 to provide information about user and non-user data collection (including of children and teenagers) and data use by the companies that found that the companies' user and non-user data practices put individuals vulnerable to identity theft, stalking, unlawful discrimination, emotional distress and mental health issues, social stigma, and reputational harm.

== Early history (2005–2010) ==
On March 12, 2007, Viacom sued YouTube, demanding $1 billion in damages, said that it had found more than 150,000 unauthorized clips of its material on YouTube that had been viewed "an astounding 1.5 billion times". YouTube responded by stating that it "goes far beyond its legal obligations in assisting content owners to protect their works".

During the same court battle, Viacom won a court ruling requiring YouTube to hand over 12 terabytes of data detailing the viewing habits of every user who has watched videos on the site. The decision was criticized by the Electronic Frontier Foundation, which called the court ruling "a setback to privacy rights".

== COPPA settlement ==
In April 2018, a coalition of 23 groups (including the CCFC, CDD, and Common Sense Media) filed a complaint with the Federal Trade Commission (FTC), alleging that YouTube collected information from users under the age of 13 without parental consent by using the trackers used across the internet to identify users, in violation of the Children's Online Privacy Protection Act (COPPA). They also alleged that YouTube had knowledge of their child user base and still served targeted advertising based on collected data to child audiences. The complaint points to examples of YouTube marketing themselves as a popular platform for kids in presentations given to large toymakers such as Hasbro and Mattel.

In September 2019, YouTube was fined $170 million by the FTC for collecting personal information from minors under the age of 13 (in particular, viewing history) without parental consent, in order to allow channel operators to serve targeted advertising on their videos. In particular, the FTC ruled that YouTube was partly liable under COPPA, as the service's rating and curation of content as being suitable for children constituted the targeting of the website towards children. In order to comply with the settlement, YouTube was ordered to "develop, implement, and maintain a system for Channel Owners to designate whether their Content on the YouTube Service is directed to Children." YouTube also announced that it would invest $100 million over the next three years to support the creation of "thoughtful, original children's content".

YouTube began to implement its compliance approach in November 2019, in line with its settlement with the FTC. All channels are required to declare if their content is "made for kids", either as a blanket claim for their entire channel, or on a per-video basis. The company stated that a video was considered "made for kids" if its primary audience was children, or was "directed" to children based on various factors as guidelines (even if they are not the primary audience), including use of child actors, "characters, celebrities, or toys that appeal to children", depictions of "activities that appeal to children, such as play-acting, simple songs or games, or early education", and poems, songs, and stories intended for children, easy to understand language, and child actors. YouTube would employ machine learning to find videos that they believed were clearly "made for kids" and automatically mark them as such, but would not help or advise content creators for videos that fall into unclear categories, as this constituted legal advice. Liability for failing proper marking channels or videos as "made for kids" would fall onto the channel owners, with the FTC being able to issue up to $42,530 fines per infringing video, though the FTC clarified that the amount would be based on "a company's financial condition and the impact a penalty could have on its ability to stay in business".

Beginning in January 2020, videos marked as being "made for kids" carry restricted functionality in order to prevent data collection from minors: social and community features such as end screens and other widgets, notification functions, and comments are disabled, and videos can only be monetized with contextual advertising based on the video's metadata.

The new policies have faced criticism, with some channel owners having considered YouTube and the FTC's guidance to be unclear in certain edge cases, such as video gaming (where content may typically be directed towards teens and young adults, but may still contain characters that appeal to children). They also noted that according to YouTube, a lack of targeted ads could reduce a video's revenue, and that the lack of social features might impact the ability for their videos to receive promotion. Videos marked as "made for kids" were also excluded from Google search engine results, further lowering revenue for content creators. Content creators who were unsure of whether their content was "made for kids" argued they would either need to preemptively mark their videos as such or make their videos private, or otherwise would be at risk of being fined by the FTC.

The legal language of COPPA offered the ability for content to be marked for "mixed audience", which would allow for data collection from the viewers once the viewer had identified themselves of being 13 years or older. YouTube's decision not to include a "mixed audience" as a third option has been criticized, since this option would alleviate content creator concerns. YouTube had stated in their information page related to the COPPA requirements that "there are some complexities with the mixed audience category" which they have submitted to the FTC during public comment periods, and in the interim "decided to streamline the options for creators by creating a single 'Made for kids' category to avoid further confusion in an already unclear space."

FTC commissioner Rebecca Kelly Slaughter noted in dissenting remarks that many of the child-directed channels on YouTube were run by owners outside of the U.S., which may fall outside the jurisdiction of COPPA and the FTC's "practical reach". The FTC issued a blog post on November 22, 2019, to clarify what it considered "made for kids" and that several factors will be used to make this determination, and that it recognized that some types of content, like animated programming, can appeal to all ages and would not immediately become subject to COPPA's requirements. The FTC also directed creators to its original complaint against YouTube, identifying channels and video content that they considered to be under COPPA that was the basis of their case.

On December 10, 2019, citing the aforementioned criticism, YouTube filed comments with the FTC requesting clarity on its rules, citing the aforementioned edge cases. YouTube started treating all videos designated as "made for kids" as liable under COPPA on January 6, 2020. YouTube's machine learning system for categorizing videos resulted in some videos that contain drugs, profanity, sexual content, and violence, alongside some age-restricted videos, also being affected and presented to child audiences, despite YouTube claiming that such content is "likely not made for kids". Some creators have reported that they were unable to change the automatically set "made for kids" setting on their videos, even when they believed such settings to be made in error.

On July 22, 2025, YouTube has increased the minimum age required for livestreaming from 13 to 16 and stated that children aged 13–15 will need an accompanying adult in order to be able to use all of the livestreaming features (e.g. live chat) and in the future, YouTube might start taking down streams from children under 16 and restrict their ability to livestream.

On December 30, 2025, The Walt Disney Company was fined $10 million by the FTC for failing to mark certain videos on its channels as "made for kids", including videos featuring popular Disney franchises such as Tangled and Coco.

== Battle against Ad Blockers ==
YouTube eventually attempted to ban ad blockers, which keep people safe from maliciously coded advertisements ("Malvertising") as well as scam ads, beginning in May 2023, a move that drew criticism. This began with pop-ups claiming that ad blockers were no longer allowed and that people were required to turn them off on the site. This drew considerable backlash, and many users refused to turn off their own protection.

In June 2023, this attempt escalated into a "three strike rule" that would make YouTube unusable after three videos were played, using ad blockers on the site. Again, the site drew intense criticism from users.

In October 2023, YouTube expanded its global crackdown on ad blockers, prompting criticism from users and privacy advocates. Critics characterized the move as an effort to increase YouTube Premium subscriptions. Privacy groups, including those citing the EU's EPrivacy Directive, argued that YouTube's method of detecting ad-blocking software without prior consent constituted an encroachment on user privacy.

In April 2024, YouTube updated its enforcement policy to target third-party applications that bypass advertisements. In June of the same year, they attempted to start using Server-side ad injection (SSAI) to "stitch" ads directly onto videos, thus preventing ad blockers from distinguishing ads from actual videos. This drew further criticism, as the ads have no quality control and can be Malvertising, harming people's computers. YouTube attempted to defend these tactics by claiming that YouTube Premium would block ads and that they were enforcing a clause in their TOS that banned AdBlockers. However, this is largely considered to be an update to their Terms of Service in 2019, which seemed intended to be a retroactive justification for attacking Adblockers.

YouTube began enacting 'Performance throttling', effectively downgrading video quality or even slowing load times or both in a further attempt to discourage the use of ad blockers.

Beginning in late 2025 and continuing into early 2026, YouTube users globally reported an increase in "This content isn't available" error messages. Technical analyses by outlets such as How-To Geek and The Register identified these messages as an intentional enforcement mechanism triggered when the platform detects ad-blocking software. While some users initially perceived the errors as server outages, reports indicated that disabling browser extensions or using YouTube Premium resolved the issue, confirming it as a server-side detection strategy.

Users of YouTube only care about blocking ads on YouTube itself, so the fact that YouTube Premium's price doesn't go fully to the blocking of just ads on YouTube has resulted in many users refusing to pay for the Premium 'ad blocking' service and either continue with ad blockers or else leave the platform altogether.

The fact that YouTube has a means to detect whether or not someone is using an ad blocker on the site has led the EU to accuse YouTube of using spyware, and claiming that their anti-Adblocker spyware violates the EU's ePrivacy Directive, specifically article 5.3, which they claim requires consent before storing information on or about a user's device.

Currently there are several legal challenges to the policy, which YouTube has insisted should be able to qualify for an exception to the Directive. The most recent being in 2026;

- The Ireland Data Protection Commission (DPC): This is the lead regulator for Google in the EU. They have officially accepted Alexander Hanff's complaint against YouTube regarding its anti-adblocker policies, which he escalated in 2023, and are currently investigating YouTube's practices.
- European Commission: In November 2023, the Commission sent formal requests for information to YouTube regarding its adblock detection as part of the Digital Services Act (DSA).
- The Irish Adtech Probe (2026): A separate but related investigation by the Irish DPC into Google's general advertising data practices is expected to reach preliminary conclusions in early 2026.

== See also ==
- Privacy concerns regarding Google
