= Phil Simon =

American speaker, professor, and author

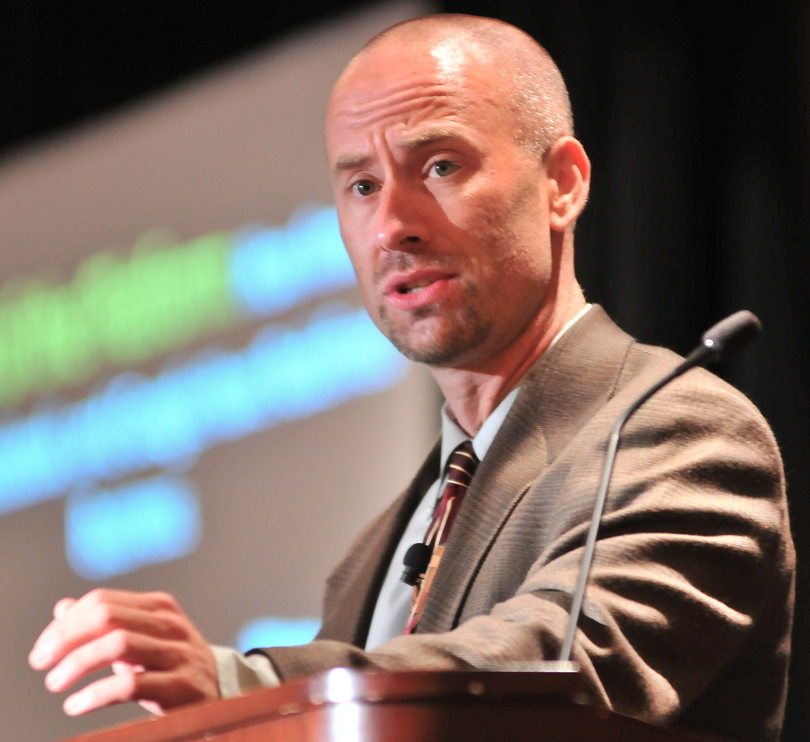
- Simon speaking at PostalVision 2020 in 2012.
- Education: Carnegie Mellon University (BS); Cornell University (MILR)
- Occupations: Author, public speaker, and professor
- Website: www.philsimon.com

Phil Simon (born ca. 1972) is an American speaker, professor, and author. He writes about management, technology, disruption, communication, and analytics.

== Education ==
Simon studied economics and political science at Carnegie Mellon University, receiving his BS in Policy and Management in 1993. He studied labor relations at Cornell University and obtained his MILR in 1997.

== Work ==
Simon started his career as human-resource consultant in 1997 at Capital One for a year, and at Merck & Co. for two years. After two more years as an application consultant for Lawson Software, he started his own consulting firm.

He has written 14 books, including The Nine: The Tectonic Forces Reshaping the Workplace, Low-Code/No-Code: Citizen Developers and the Surprising Future of Business Applications, and Reimagining Collaboration: Slack, Microsoft Teams, Zoom, and the Post-COVID World of Work. He also contributed to the 2020 book Agile: The Insights You Need from Harvard Business Review (HBR Insights Series), along with Scrum co-creator Jeff Sutherland.

In May 2016, Simon accepted a position as a full-time faculty member at the W. P. Carey School of Business at Arizona State University. He left ASU in May 2020.

His work has appeared in Fast Company, the New York Times, CNN, Inc. Magazine, Harvard Business Review The Huffington Post, and many other sites.

== Awards ==
In February 2016, Simon received a 2015 Axiom award for Message Not Received: Why Business Communication Is Broken and How to Fix It in the category of networking / communication. In 2012, he received a 2011 Axiom best business technology book award for The Age of the Platform: How Amazon, Apple, Facebook, and Google Have Redefined Business.

Simon announced in April 2012 that The Age of the Platform: How Amazon, Apple, Facebook, and Google Have Redefined Business would be translated into Korean in late 2012.

== Selected publications ==
- Simon, Phil (2010). Why New Systems Fail. Cengage. p. 354. ISBN 9781435456440.
- Simon, Phil (2010). The Next Wave of Technologies. John Wiley & Sons. p. 432. ISBN 978-0-470-58750-8.
- Simon, Phil (2010). The New Small. Motion Publishing. p. 316. ISBN 9780982930236.
- Simon, Phil (2011). The Age of the Platform: How Amazon, Apple, Facebook, and Google Have Redefined Business. Motion Publishing. p. 312. ISBN 9780982930250.
- Simon, Phil (2013). Too Big to Ignore: The Business Case for Big Data. John Wiley & Sons. p. 250. ISBN 9781118638170.
- Simon, Phil (2014). The Visual Organization: Data Visualization, Big Data, and the Quest for Better Decisions. John Wiley & Sons. p. 240. ISBN 9781118794388.
- Simon, Phil (2015). Message Not Received: Why Business Communication Is Broken and How to Fix It. John Wiley & Sons. p. 250. ISBN 9781119017035.
- Simon, Phil (2017). Analytics: The Agile Way. John Wiley & Sons. p. 292. ISBN 978-1119423478.
- Simon, Phil (2020). Slack For Dummies. John Wiley & Sons. p. 384. ISBN 978-1119669500.
- Simon, Phil (2020). Zoom For Dummies. John Wiley & Sons. p. 400. ISBN 978-1119742142.
- Simon, Phil (2021). Reimagining Collaboration: Slack, Microsoft Teams, Zoom, and the Post-COVID World of Work. Motion Publishing. p. 284. ISBN 978-0982930229.
