= BATX =

Four biggest tech firms in China

BATX is an acronym standing for Baidu, Alibaba, Tencent, and Xiaomi, the four biggest tech firms in China, often compared to Big Tech (Microsoft, Apple, Alphabet, Amazon, and Meta) in the United States. BATX were some of the first tech companies started in the 2000s during the rise of the Chinese technology revolution and quickly became widely used in China. Notably after 2015, some other tech companies like Huawei, DiDi, JD, Meituan, DJI and ByteDance have also become some of the up-and-coming biggest tech giants in the industry.

== List ==
Name	Revenue by 2018	Employees	Headquarter	Since	CEO
Baidu	$14,874 mm	42,267	Beijing, China	2000	Robin Yanhong Li
Alibaba	$38,898 mm	101,958	Hangzhou, China	1999	Jack Ma
Tencent	$312,694 mm	54,309	Shenzhen, China	1998	Ma Huateng
Xiaomi	$44,421 mm	14,513	Beijing, China	2010	Lei Jun

== History ==
In 2000, under Chairman Jiang Zemin's instruction, China started the Golden Shield Project to manage the media and information flow within China, in an attempt to protect national security and limit the infiltration of Western propaganda. Under the Golden Shield Project, many American tech companies such as Google, Facebook, Netflix, and the like were denied access into China from the Great Firewall due to their refusal to follow local data laws, while others, such as Microsoft and LinkedIn, were allowed. At the same time, the population of Chinese netizens grew substantially since the introduction of internet in 1994. By 2018, China contains a population of 800 million netizens, 98% of whom are mobile users. Many Chinese tech companies flourished under this system, without competition from foreign businesses. BATX are a few of the earliest tech companies who saw the chance and began to occupy the internet market in the early ages of China's internet transformation.

== Influences ==
=== Baidu ===
Baidu logo

Baidu Search is the most popular search engine in China. Baidu is often contrasted with Google, which is the biggest search engine company founded in the United States. Google is banned in China. So Baidu provides an equivalent search experience for China's netizens. Other than Baidu Search, Baidu also provides many different other products, such as Baidu Maps, Baidu Cloud, Baidu Tieba, Baidu Knows, and more, catered to different needs for Chinese netizens. Baidu accounts for 64.55% of the search engine market share in China, and also is the third biggest search engine website in the world.

=== Alibaba ===
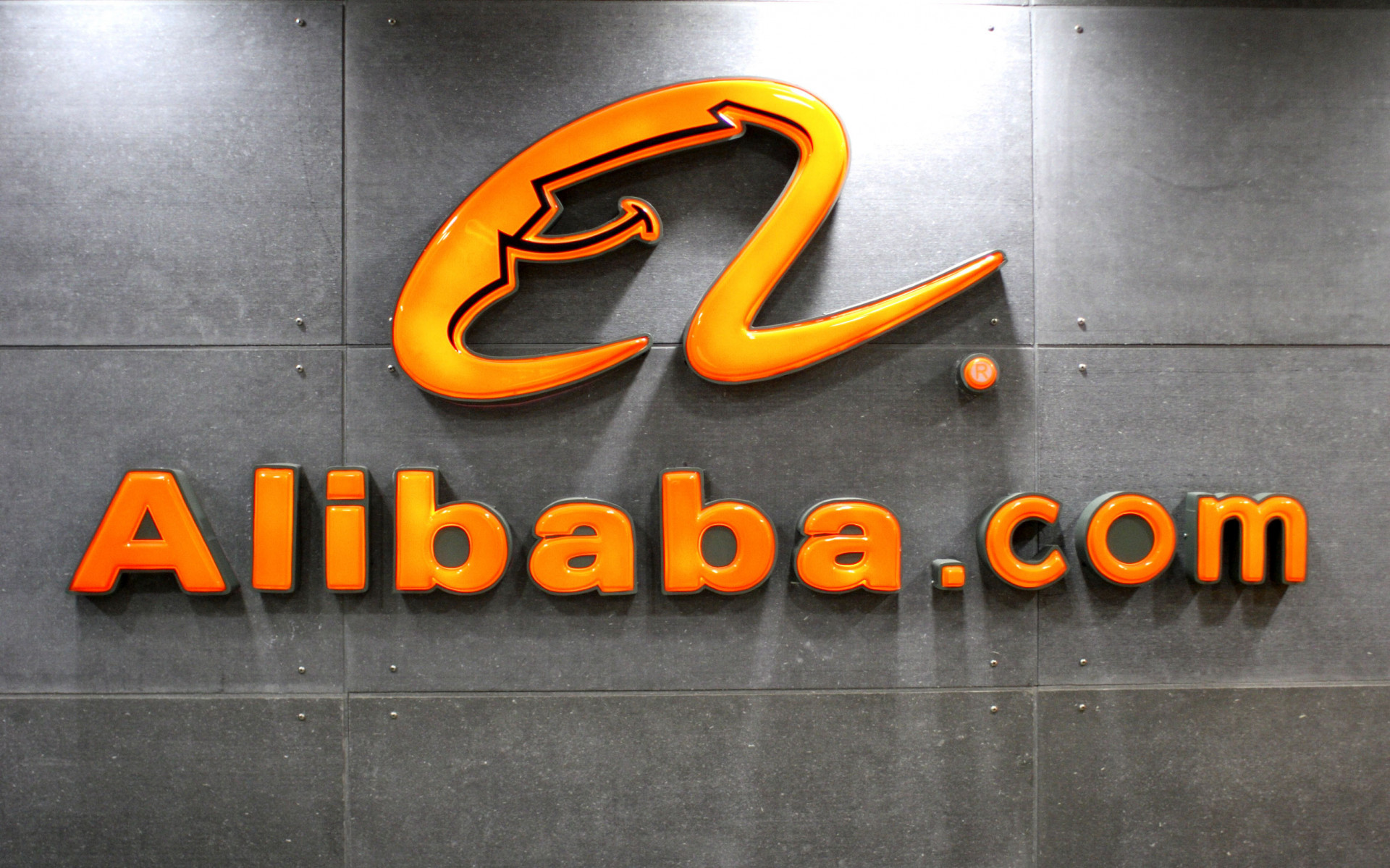
Alibaba Group logo

The Alibaba Group was first started as an e-commerce company in 1999 in Hangzhou, China. Since then, it has become a giant tech corporation, including branches like e-commerce, entertainment, online payment, cloud-computing, and AI technology. Its most famous C2C products are Taobao and Alipay, which are closely incorporated into every Chinese online shopping experience. In 2017, Taobao.com was the third most visited website in China after Baidu.com and QQ.com. Taobao accounted for 58.2% of the e-commerce market share in China by 2018. In 2024, Alibaba Group integrated its domestic Chinese and international e-commerce platforms into a single business unit run by one leader for the first time. The Alibaba E-commerce Business Group was the new name of the unit and brought together Taobao and Tmall Group, as well as Alibaba International Digital Commerce (AIDC) Group. AIDC included AliExpress and Alibaba.com that operated in different regions including Southeast Asia and Turkey. Jiang Fan was named as the new international unit head. In December of 2024, Alibaba also recorded double-digit growth in public cloud services, especially for all AI related product revenue. It achieved triple-digit growth for the fifth consecutive year. Alibaba saw an uptick in its stock in 2025 when there was news that the company would work to make advancements in cloud technology and artificial intelligence. In 2026, Alibaba announced it was shifting from AI investment to full-scale commercialization, making AI its next major growth engine. Alibaba forecasted that 30 billion yuan in AI revenue would be generated in 2026 with AI agents, which they predicted would be the majority of Alibaba's cloud sales. Some of the company's AI-related products were already delivering triple-digit growth, showing AI was starting to lift the main business. Alibaba introduced Wukong in 2026 as an AI platform after the OpenClaw, which is an open-source autonomous AI agent that can run through chat applications like WhatsApp, Discord, Telegram, etc. Wukong can coordinate multiple agents within a single workflow so that businesses can automate tasks like document editing, spreadsheet updates, meeting transcription, approvals, and research. It can be obtained as a standalone desktop application and inside DingTalk, Alibaba's collaboration tool used by more than 20 million corporate users. Wukong has built-in enterprise security features like identity authentication, granular access control, and sandboxing. At the moment, Wukong is currently in beta mode and invitation-only, but eventually will connect with tools like Slack, Microsoft Teams, and WeChat. Accio Work is another AI tool that Alibaba launched to support small to medium sized businesses. Wukong and Accio Work are two separate Alibaba agentic AI tools that were launched in March 2026. However the differences lies in that Wukong is associated with DingTalk and targets enterprise workplace automation, while Accio Work, has been developed by Alibaba International focuses more on global commerce and small and medium business operations. They are both related to Alibaba's multi-agent AI strategy but they are not built with the same technology, nor do both of them use the same underlying systems. Both systems do illustrate Alibaba's effort to create independent AI tools that promote workplace collaboration, international trade and business-process automation.

=== Tencent ===
Tencent logo

Tencent was first started by Ma Huateng as a social network platform. Most Chinese netizens came to know Tencent through its messaging platform QQ. Now, Tencent has developed many more areas of business, including social platform, entertainment, e-commerce, online payment, information services, and artificial intelligence. WeChat, one of the most famous messaging apps from Tencent, had 169.6 million active monthly users in 2018. WeChat is the third most commonly used messaging app worldwide in 2018, after WhatsApp and Messenger. Tencent Entertainment is also the No.1 in the online gaming industry in the world by 2018, followed directly by Sony.

=== Xiaomi ===
Xiaomi logo

Xiaomi, in contrast to the other three, focuses more on hardware technology like smartphones, home automation, smart TVs and other smart devices. Two thirds of Xiaomi's profit is generated by smartphone sales. Xiaomi became the biggest smart phone maker in China in 2014 before plummeting down to fifth place in 2016.

== Other tech companies in China ==
Although BATX has been a very popular acronym for people when referring to the biggest Chinese tech firms, there are also many other tech firms has picked up after 2010 and also became the leaders in their respective fields. On Forbes' 2019 Global 2000, 20 out of 184 tech companies on the list are from China.

=== Huawei ===
Huawei logo

Huawei became one of the most well known Chinese tech companies in the world by the 2010s. Founded by Ren Zhengfei at 1987 at Shenzhen China, it focuses on information and communications technology (ICT) infrastructure and smart devices. Huawei became the No.1 at Telecommunication network in the world by 2012 and launched its first 5G smartphone, Mate 20 X 5G in July 2019. In 2018, Huawei generated revenue of 721,202 mm RMB of revenue, which is approximately 101,910.32 mm dollars.

=== DiDi ===
DIDI logo

DiDi Chuxing is the most popular taxi hailing service app in China. In 2018, there were over 30 million rides being used on DiDi each day. DiDi is available in more than 400 cities in China and has over 550 million users. DiDi accounted for 71.4% of the taxi hailing service share in China in 2018.

=== DJI ===
DJI logo

DJI is a private Shenzhen-based technology firm which is the leading consumer and industrial unmanned aerial vehicles (drones) manufacturer today, holding a 76% market share worldwide as of August 2021. Their products are sold worldwide and include the Phantom and Mavic camera drone series, the Osmo camera and gimbal series, the DJI FPV series of first person racing drones, the Ronin series of camera gimbals, as well as the RoboMaster series of educational robots.

== See also ==
- Big Tech
