= List of members of the Federal Trade Commission =

Seal of the United States Federal Trade Commission (FTC)

The following is a list of individuals who have served as a member of the Federal Trade Commission (FTC) beginning in 1949.

== Current commissioners ==
The commission is headed by five commissioners, who each serve seven-year terms. Commissioners are nominated by the president and confirmed by the Senate. No more than three commissioners can be of the same political party. In practice, this means that two commissioners are of the opposition party. However, three members of the FTC throughout its history have been without party affiliation, with the most recent independent, Pamela Jones Harbour, serving from 2003 to 2009.

Portrait	Name	Party	Prior experience	Education	Term began	Term expires
	Andrew Ferguson (Chair)	Republican	Solicitor general of the Commonwealth of Virginia	University of Virginia (BA) University of Virginia (JD)	April 2, 2024	September 26, 2030
	Mark Meador	Republican	Legal advisor to Senator Mike Lee	University of Chicago (BA) University of Houston (JD)	April 16, 2025	September 26, 2031
	Vacant	—N/a	—	—	—	September 26, 2026
	Vacant	—N/a	—	—	—	September 26, 2029
	Vacant	—N/a	—	—	—	September 26, 2032

== Former commissioners ==
The following is a list of individuals who have served as a member of the Federal Trade Commission (FTC) beginning in 1949, including party affiliation.

Commissioners	Party	Years in office	Prior experience
John J. Carson	Republican	September 28, 1948 – March 31, 1953	Journalist, The Baltimore Sun
Stephen J. Spingarn	Democratic	October 25, 1950 – September 25, 1953	Assistant General Counsel, Department of the Treasury
Caspar Weinberger	Republican	December 31, 1969 – August 6, 1970	California State Assemblyman for the 21st district
Philip Elman	Independent	April 21, 1961 – October 18, 1970	Assistant to the Solicitor General
Miles Kirkpatrick	Republican	September 14, 1970 – February 20, 1973	Head of the Antitrust Section, American Bar Association (ABA)
Everette MacIntyre	Democratic	September 26, 1961 – August 30, 1973	FTC trial lawyer
Mary Gardiner Jones	Republican	October 29, 1964 – November 2, 1973	Staff attorney, DOJ Antitrust Division
David S. Dennison Jr.	Republican	October 18, 1970 – December 31, 1973	Congressman from Ohio's 11th district
Mayo J. Thompson	Democratic	July 8, 1973 – September 26, 1975	Antitrust attorney in private practice
Lewis A. Engman	Democratic	February 20, 1973 – December 31, 1975	Assistant Director, White House Domestic Council
Calvin J. Collier	Republican	March 24, 1976 – December 31, 1977	Director of Urban Program Coordination, Department of Housing and Urban Development
Stephen A. Nye	Republican	May 5, 1974 – May 5, 1978	Partner at Sullivan, Jones and Archer LLP
Elizabeth Hanford Dole	Democratic (1973-1975) Republican (1975-1979)	December 4, 1973 – March 9, 1979	Director, White House Office of Consumer Affairs
Paul Rand Dixon	Democratic	March 21, 1961 – September 25, 1981	FTC trial attorney
David A. Clanton	Republican	August 26, 1975 – October 14, 1983	Minority Staff Counsel, Senate Committee on Commerce
Michael Pertschuk	Democratic	April 21, 1977 – October 15, 1984	Chief Counsel, Senate Committee on Commerce
George W. Douglas	Democratic	December 27, 1982 – September 18, 1985	President, Southwest Econometrics Inc. (private economic research firm)
James C. Miller III	Republican	September 30, 1981 – October 5, 1985	Administrator, Office of Information and Regulatory Affairs (OIRA)
Patricia P. Bailey	Republican	October 29, 1979 – May 15, 1988	Assistant to the General Counsel, Merit Systems Protection Board
Daniel Oliver	Republican	April 21, 1986 – August 10, 1989	Executive Editor, National Review
Terry Calvani	Republican	November 18, 1983 – September 25, 1990	Law professor, Vanderbilt University School of Law
Andrew Strenio	Democratic	March 17, 1986 – July 15, 1991	Member, Interstate Commerce Commission (ICC)
Deborah K. Owen	Republican	October 25, 1989 – August 26, 1994	Associate White House Counsel
Dennis A. Yao	Democratic	July 16, 1991 – August 31, 1994	Professor, Wharton School of Business
Christine A. Varney	Democratic	October 17, 1994 – August 5, 1997	White House Cabinet Secretary
Janet D. Steiger	Republican	August 11, 1989 – September 28, 1997	Chair of the Postal Rate Commission
Roscoe B. Starek III	Republican	November 19, 1990 – December 18, 1997	Deputy Director of Presidential Personnel
Mary Azcuenaga	Independent	November 27, 1984 – June 3, 1998	FTC Assistant General Counsel
Robert Pitofsky	Democratic	June 29, 1978 – April 30, 1981 April 11, 1995 – May 31, 2001	Director, FTC Bureau of Consumer Protection
Sheila F. Anthony	Democratic	September 30, 1997 – August 1, 2003	Assistant Attorney General for Legislative Affairs
Timothy Muris	Republican	June 4, 2001 – August 15, 2004	Law professor, GMU School of Law
Mozelle W. Thompson	Democratic	December 17, 1997 – August 31, 2004	Deputy Assistant Secretary of the Treasury for Financial Policy
Orson Swindle	Republican	December 18, 1997 – June 30, 2005	Assistant Secretary of Commerce for Development
Thomas B. Leary	Republican	November 17, 1999 – December 31, 2005	Assistant General Counsel, General Motors
Deborah Platt Majoras	Republican	August 16, 2004 – March 29, 2008	Deputy Assistant Attorney General, DOJ Antitrust Division
Pamela Jones Harbour	Independent	August 4, 2003 – April 6, 2010	Deputy Attorney General of New York
William Kovacic	Republican	January 4, 2006 – October 3, 2011	Law professor, The George Washington University Law School
J. Thomas Rosch	Republican	January 5, 2006 - Sept 2012	Director, FTC Bureau of Competition
Jon Leibowitz	Democratic	March 2, 2009 – March 7, 2013	Lobbyist, Motion Picture Association of America (MPAA)
Joshua D. Wright	Republican	January 11, 2013 – August 24, 2015	Law professor, GMU Antonin Scalia Law School
Julie Brill	Democratic	April 6, 2010 – March 31, 2016	Assistant Attorney General of Vermont for Consumer Protection and Antitrust
Edith Ramirez	Democratic	April 5, 2010 – February 10, 2017	Vice President, LA Department of Water and Power Board of Commissioners
Terrell McSweeny	Democratic	April 28, 2014 – April 27, 2018	Chief Counsel for Competition Policy and Intergovernmental Relations, DOJ Antitrust Division
Joseph Simons	Republican	May 1, 2018 – January 29, 2021	Director, FTC Bureau of Competition
Rohit Chopra	Democratic	May 2, 2018 – October 12, 2021	CFPB Assistant Director
Noah J. Phillips	Republican	May 2, 2018 – October 14, 2022	Counsel to Senator John Cornyn
Rebecca Slaughter	Democratic	May 2, 2018 – September 8, 2025	Legal advisor to Senator Chuck Schumer
Christine S. Wilson	Republican	September 26, 2018 – March 31, 2023	Senior Vice President, Delta Air Lines
Lina Khan	Democratic	June 15, 2021 – January 31, 2025	Legal scholar
Alvaro Bedoya	Democratic	May 16, 2022 – March 18, 2025	Director of the Center on Privacy and Technology at the Georgetown University Law Center
Melissa Holyoak	Republican	March 25, 2024 – November 17, 2025	Solicitor general of Utah

List of Federal Trade Commission members (1918–2023)

== Chairs ==
The following is a list of the chairs of the Federal Trade Commission.

=== Chairs selected by the members ===
No.	Image	Chair	Party	Start	End	Refs.
1		Joseph E. Davies	Democratic	March 16, 1915	June 30, 1916	
2		Edward N. Hurley	Democratic	July 1, 1916	January 31, 1917	
3		William J. Harris	Democratic	February 1, 1917	May 6, 1918	
4		William Byron Colver	Democratic	May 7, 1918	June 30, 1919	
5		John Franklin Fort	Republican	July 1, 1919	November 30, 1919	
6		Victor Murdock	Progressive	December 1, 1919	November 30, 1920	
7		Samuel Huston Thompson	Democratic	December 1, 1920	November 30, 1921	
8		Nelson B. Gaskill	Republican	December 1, 1921	November 30, 1922	
9		Victor Murdock	Progressive	December 1, 1922	November 30, 1923	
10		Samuel Huston Thompson	Democratic	December 1, 1923	November 30, 1924	
11		Vernon W. Van Fleet	Republican	December 1, 1924	November 30, 1925	
12		John F. Nugent	Democratic	December 1, 1925	November 30, 1926	
13		Charles W. Hunt	Republican	December 1, 1926	November 30, 1927	
14		William E. Humphrey	Republican	December 1, 1927	November 30, 1928	
15		Abram F. Myers	Republican	December 1, 1928	January 15, 1929	
16		Edgar A. McCulloch	Democratic	January 16, 1929	November 30, 1929	
17		Garland Ferguson Jr.	Democratic	January 1, 1930	December 30, 1930	
18		Charles W. Hunt	Republican	January 1, 1931	December 31, 1931	
19		William E. Humphrey	Republican	February 1, 1932	December 31, 1932	
20		Charles H. March	Republican	January 1, 1933	December 31, 1933	
21		Garland Ferguson Jr.	Democratic	January 1, 1934	December 31, 1934	
22		Ewin L. Davis	Democratic	January 1, 1935	December 31, 1935	
23		Charles H. March	Republican	January 1, 1936	December 31, 1936	
24		William Augustus Ayres	Democratic	January 1, 1937	December 31, 1937	
25		Garland Ferguson Jr.	Democratic	January 1, 1938	December 31, 1938	
26		Robert E. Freer	Republican	January 1, 1939	December 31, 1939	
27		Ewin L. Davis	Democratic	January 1, 1940	December 31, 1940	
28		Charles H. March	Republican	January 1, 1941	December 31, 1941	
29		William Augustus Ayres	Democratic	January 1, 1942	December 31, 1942	
30		Garland Ferguson Jr.	Democratic	January 1, 1943	December 31, 1943	
31		Robert E. Freer	Republican	January 1, 1944	December 31, 1944	
32		Ewin L. Davis	Democratic	January 1, 1945	December 31, 1945	
33		William Augustus Ayres	Democratic	January 1, 1946	December 31, 1946	
34		Garland Ferguson Jr.	Democratic	January 1, 1947	December 31, 1947	
35		Robert E. Freer	Republican	January 1, 1948	December 31, 1948	
36		Lowell B. Mason	Republican	January 1, 1949	May 23, 1950	

=== Chairs designated by the president ===
No.	Image	Chair	Party	Start	End	Refs.
37		James M. Mead	Democratic	May 24, 1950	March 31, 1953	
38		Edward F. Howrey	Republican	April 1, 1953	September 12, 1955	
39		John W. Gwynne	Republican	September 12, 1955	May 31, 1959	
40		Earl W. Kintner	Republican	June 11, 1959	March 20, 1961	
41		Paul Rand Dixon	Democratic	March 21, 1961	December 31, 1969	
42		Caspar Weinberger	Republican	January 1, 1970	August 6, 1970	
Acting		Everette MacIntyre	Democratic	August 8, 1970	September 14, 1970	
43		Miles W. Kirkpatrick	Republican	September 15, 1970	February 20, 1973	
44		Lewis A. Engman	Republican	February 21, 1973	December 31, 1975	
Acting		Paul Rand Dixon	Democratic	January 1, 1976	March 25, 1976	
45		Calvin J. Collier	Republican	March 25, 1976	April 20, 1977	
46		Michael Pertschuk	Democratic	April 21, 1977	March 3, 1981	
Acting		David A. Clanton	Republican	March 4, 1981	September 25, 1981	
47		James C. Miller III	Republican	September 26, 1981	October 4, 1985	
Acting		Terry Calvani	Republican	October 7, 1985	April 20, 1986	
48		Daniel Oliver	Republican	April 21, 1986	August 10, 1989	
49		Janet Dempsey Steiger	Republican	August 11, 1989	April 11, 1995	
50		Robert Pitofsky	Democratic	April 11, 1995	May 31, 2001	
51		Timothy Muris	Republican	June 4, 2001	August 15, 2004	
52		Deborah Platt Majoras	Republican	August 16, 2004	March 30, 2008	
Acting		William Kovacic	Republican	March 31, 2008	March 1, 2009	
53		Jon Leibowitz	Democratic	March 2, 2009	March 4, 2013	
54		Edith Ramirez	Democratic	March 4, 2013	January 25, 2017	
Acting		Maureen Ohlhausen	Republican	January 25, 2017	May 1, 2018	
55		Joseph Simons	Republican	May 1, 2018	January 21, 2021	
Acting		Rebecca Slaughter	Democratic	January 21, 2021	June 15, 2021	
56		Lina Khan	Democratic	June 15, 2021	January 20, 2025	
57		Andrew N. Ferguson	Republican	January 20, 2025	present	

== Backgrounds of commissioners ==
=== Demographics ===
As of 2021, there have been:

- Three African-Americans to serve on the FTC: A. Leon Higginbotham Jr. (served from 1962 to 1964), Mozelle W. Thompson (served from 1997 to 2004), Pamela Jones Harbour (served from 2003 to 2009).
- Three Asian-Americans to serve on the FTC: Dennis Yao (served from 1991 to 1994), Rohit Chopra (served since 2018), and Lina Khan (served since 2021); Khan is the first Asian-American to serve as FTC Chair.
- Three independents to serve on the FTC: Philip Elman (served from 1961 to 1970), Mary Azcuenaga (served from 1984 to 1998), and Pamela Jones Harbour (served from 2003 to 2009)

=== Career backgrounds ===
The vast majority of FTC members have been individuals with legal backgrounds, with notable exceptions. President Ronald Reagan appointed the first two professional economists, James C. Miller III and George W. Douglas, to serve on the body. Dennis Yao, a Democrat who served from 1991 to 1994, held a Ph.D in economics, and Joshua D. Wright, a Republican who served from 2013 to 2015, held a both a J.D. and a Ph.D. in economics.
