= Maureen Ohlhausen =

American lawyer (born 1962)

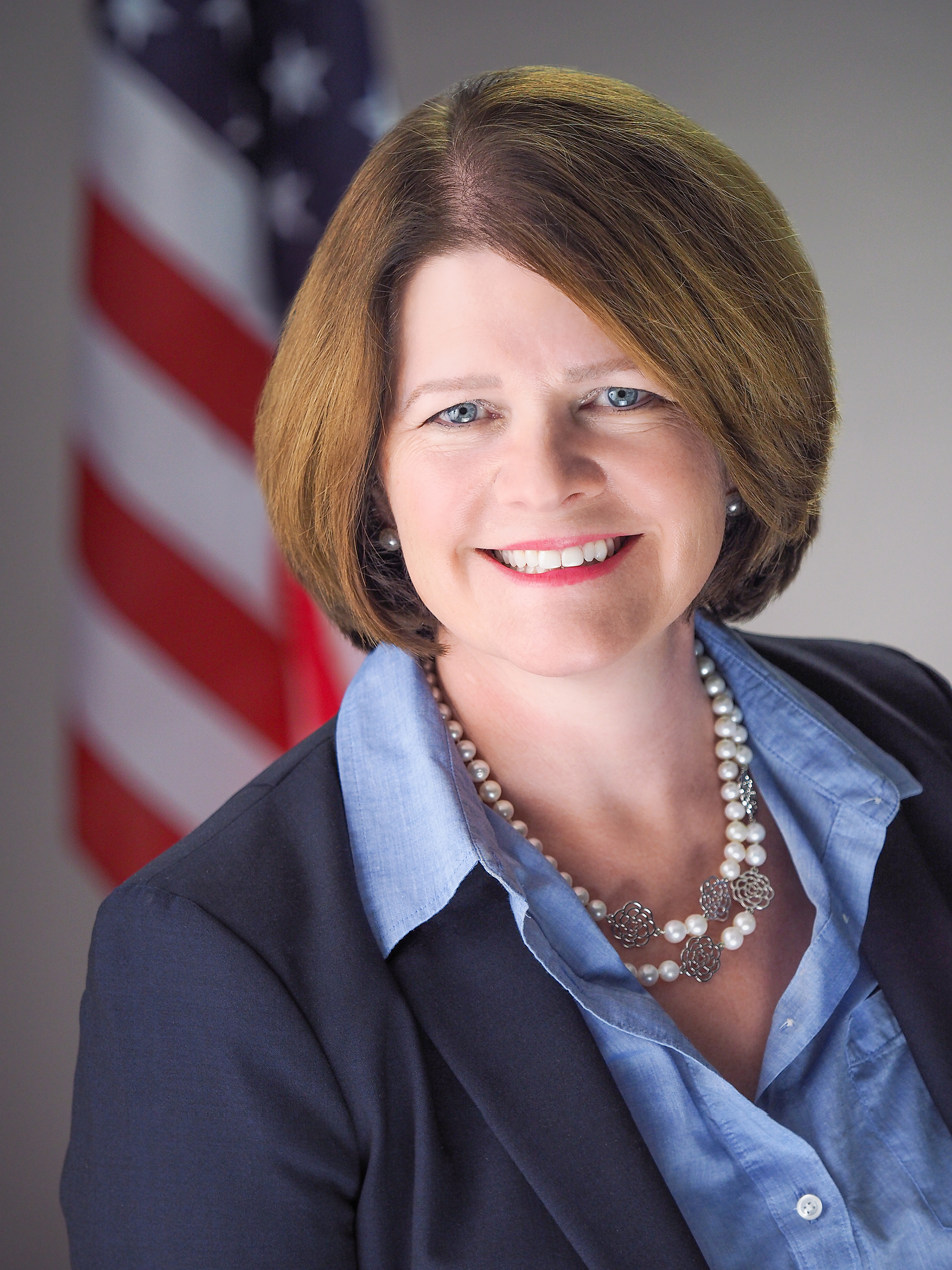
- Ohlhausen in 2016

Chair of the Federal Trade Commission
- Acting; January 25, 2017 – May 1, 2018
- President: Donald Trump
- Preceded by: Edith Ramirez
- Succeeded by: Joseph Simons

Commissioner of the Federal Trade Commission
- In office April 4, 2012 – September 25, 2018
- President: Barack Obama; Donald Trump
- Preceded by: William Kovacic
- Succeeded by: Christine S. Wilson

Personal details
- Born: Maureen Elizabeth Kraemer; April 5, 1962 (age 64) The Bronx, New York, U.S.
- Party: Republican
- Education: University of Virginia (BA); George Mason University (JD)

Maureen Kraemer Ohlhausen (born April 5, 1962) is an American lawyer who served as acting chair of the Federal Trade Commission (FTC), from 2017 to 2018. A member of the Republican Party, she served as a commissioner of the FTC from 2012 to 2018. In 2018, she was nominated by President Donald Trump to a seat on the United States Court of Federal Claims. Ohlhausen withdrew her nomination for the federal judiciary in December 2018, opting instead to join Baker Botts as partner and co-chair of the firm's antitrust practice.

== Early legal career and education ==
Ohlhausen earned her Bachelor of Arts, with honors, from the University of Virginia in 1984, and received a Juris Doctor with distinction from George Mason University in 1991. She clerked for Judge Robert J. Yock of the United States Court of Federal Claims from 1991 to 1992 and later spent five years at the United States Court of Appeals for the District of Columbia Circuit, serving as a law clerk for Judge David B. Sentelle and as a staff attorney.

Ohlhausen previously served at the FTC for eleven years, most recently as Director of the Office of Policy Planning from 2004 to 2008, where she led the FTC's Internet Access Task Force. She was also the Deputy Director of that office. From 1998 to 2001, Ohlhausen was an attorney advisor for former FTC Commissioner Orson Swindle, advising him on competition and consumer protection matters. She started at the FTC General Counsel's Office in 1997.

Ohlhausen was on the adjunct faculty at George Mason University School of Law, where she taught privacy law and unfair trade practices. She served as a senior editor of the Antitrust Law Journal and as a member of the American Bar Association's Task Force on Competition and Public Policy. She has authored a variety of articles on competition law, privacy, and technology matters.

From 2009 to 2012, Ohlhausen was a partner at Wilkinson Barker Knauer, LLP, where she focused on FTC issues, including privacy, data protection, and cybersecurity.

In 2012, President Barack Obama nominated Ohlhausen to the Federal Trade Commission, where she served until her term expired in September 2018.

In 2024, Ohlhausen joined the law firm of Wilson Sonsini as a partner.

== Nomination to Court of Federal Claims ==
On January 23, 2018, President Donald Trump announced his intent to nominate Ohlhausen to an undetermined seat on the United States Court of Federal Claims. On January 24, 2018, her nomination was sent to the United States Senate. She was nominated to the seat vacated by Judge Lawrence J. Block, who retired on January 8, 2016. On May 9, 2018, a hearing on her nomination was held before the Senate Judiciary Committee. On June 7, 2018, her nomination was reported out of committee by an 11–10 vote.

In December 2018, Ohlhausen announced that she had withdrawn her nomination for the federal judiciary, opting instead to join Baker Botts as partner and co-chair of the firm's antitrust practice. She said "The nomination was a great honor, but when it became clear that I was unlikely to get confirmed before my [FTC] term ended, I began to look and went out into the market."

== Memberships ==
She has been a member of the Federalist Society since 1992.

== Personal life ==
Ohlhausen lives in Virginia with her husband, Peter Ohlhausen, and their four children.

== See also ==
- Donald Trump judicial appointment controversies

Political offices
| Preceded by William Kovacic | Member of the Federal Trade Commission; 2012–2018 | Succeeded by Christine S. Wilson |
| Preceded by Edith Ramirez | Chairman of the Federal Trade Commission; Acting; 2017–2018 | Succeeded by Joseph Simons |
