= Calvin J. Collier =

American judge (1942–2020)

- Born: January 6, 1942; Cicero, Illinois
- Died: October 6, 2020 (aged 78)
- Occupation: Former Chair of the Federal Trade Commission

Calvin J. Collier (January 6, 1942 – October 6, 2020) was an American lawyer who served as chair of the Federal Trade Commission, having been appointed to that position by President Gerald Ford and served from March 25, 1976 to April 20, 1977.

== Early life and education ==
Born in Cicero, Illinois, his father, Harold R. Collier, served in the United States Congress. Collier received a B.A. from Grinnell College in 1964, and an LL.B. from Duke University School of Law in 1967, where he served on the law review.

== Career ==
Collier was a law clerk for Judge Harold Leventhal of the United States Court of Appeals for the District of Columbia Circuit, and served as the director of urban program coordination for the United States Department of Housing and Urban Development before his appointment to the FTC.

Collier served on the transition team for Ronald Reagan in 1980 and 1984, and later joined Kraft Foods Inc. as Senior Vice President, General Counsel, and Secretary until his retirement.

He remained active in several educational, civic, and charitable organizations. In 2006, Collier received the Miles W. Kirkpatrick Award, awarded to individuals who have made "lasting and significant contributions to the FTC".

== Personal life ==
Collier died on October 6, 2020.

Political offices
Preceded by Paul Rand Dixon	Chairmen of the Federal Trade Commission; 1976–1977	Succeeded by Michael Pertschuk
