= Edith Ramirez =

American lawyer and politician

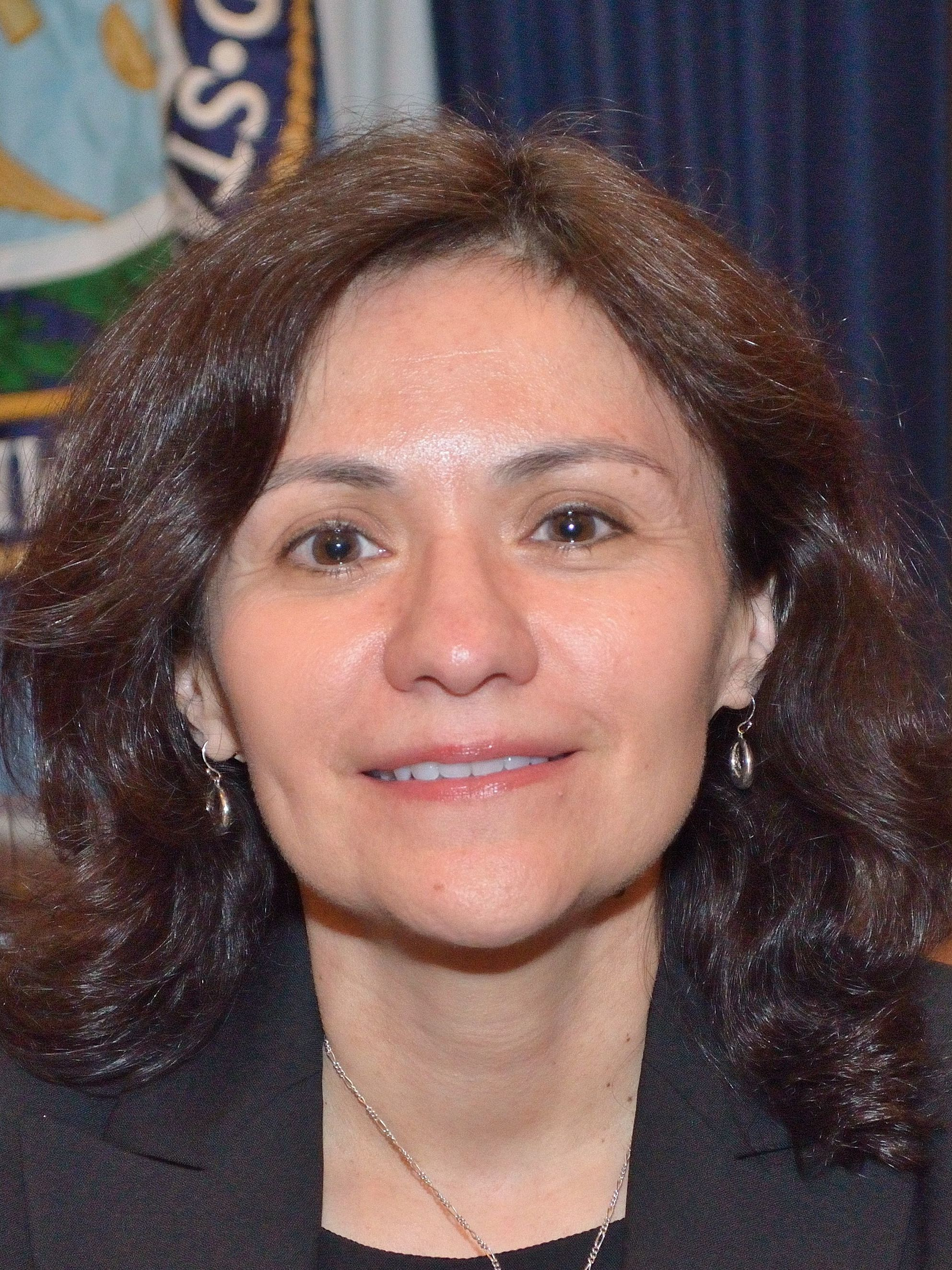

54th Chair of the Federal Trade Commission
- In office March 4, 2013 – January 25, 2017
- President: Barack Obama; Donald Trump
- Preceded by: Jon Leibowitz
- Succeeded by: Maureen Ohlhausen

Commissioner of the Federal Trade Commission
- In office April 5, 2010 – February 10, 2017
- President: Barack Obama; Donald Trump
- Preceded by: Jon Leibowitz
- Succeeded by: Rebecca Slaughter

Personal details
- Born: May 28, 1968 (age 58) San Clemente, California, U.S.
- Party: Democratic
- Education: Harvard University (BA, JD)

Edith Ramirez (born May 28, 1968) is an American attorney who served as the 54th chair of the Federal Trade Commission (FTC) from 2013 to 2017. A member of the Democratic Party, she served as a commissioner of the FTC Chair from 2010 to 2017. She is the first person from an ethnic minority to lead the agency.

== Early life and education ==
The second of four children born to Mexican immigrants from Mexico City, Ramirez was born May 28, 1968, in South Laguna, a neighborhood of Laguna Beach, California. Ramirez was raised in San Clemente, California, and attended San Clemente High School, graduating in 1985 as the class valedictorian. Growing up, Ramirez's family spoke Spanish at home, and she has stated her background as a child of immigrants has given her "a broader perspective" in her professional life.

In 1989, she graduated magna cum laude from Harvard University, where she received a bachelor's degree in history. Ramirez received her legal education from Harvard Law School, where she served as an editor of the Harvard Law Review. She befriended future President Barack Obama, who would later appoint her to the Federal Trade Commission.

== Legal career ==
After graduating from Harvard Law School cum laude in 1992, Ramirez clerked for Alfred T. Goodwin in the United States Court of Appeals for the Ninth Circuit from 1992 to 1993. From 1993 to 1996, Ramirez was an associate at Gibson, Dunn & Crutcher, LLP in Los Angeles.

Ramirez later became a partner at the Los Angeles office of Quinn Emanuel Urquhart & Sullivan, LLP, where she represented clients in intellectual property, antitrust, unfair competition, and Lanham Act (trademark) matters. Clients of Ramirez included entertainment corporation The Walt Disney Company and weapons manufacturer Northrop Grumman.

In 2008, Ramirez joined Obama's presidential campaign as director of hispanic outreach in California. Ramirez previously served on the Board of Commissioners for the Los Angeles Department of Water and Power, the nation's largest municipal utility.

== Federal Trade Commission (FTC) ==
In 2009, President Barack Obama nominated Ramirez to replace Deborah Platt Majoras on as a member of the Federal Trade Commission. Ramirez was officially sworn into the body on April 5, 2010, and in 2013 was chosen to replace Jon Leibowitz as FTC Chair. Some commentators were surprised by the selection of Ramirez as FTC Chair, with many observers expecting fellow Commissioner Julie Brill to be selected instead.

Ramirez's term was set to expire on September 25, 2015. However, Ramirez remained in the position for almost two additional years as she awaited the appointment of a successor, leaving the body on February 10, 2017. While on the FTC, Ramirez called to broaden the definition of "Personally Identifiable Information" in response to growing privacy concerns due to the increasing complexity of data ecosystems and connected devices. According to a Politico report released in 2021, Ramirez joined with two Republican Commissioners in opposition to filing charges against Google following the FTC's antitrust probe of the company.

== Career post-FTC ==
Following her tenure at the FTC, she joined the law firm of Hogan Lovells as a partner in their Washington, D.C., office. In this capacity, she co-heads the firm’s Antitrust, Competition and Economic Regulation (ACER) practice, and also works within the firm's Privacy and Cybersecurity practice.

Following the 2017 Equifax data breach, Ramirez represented Equifax in the face of privacy charges stemming from the breach. At Hogan Lovells, Ramirez represented Google-owned video platform YouTube in the face of a class action lawsuit over children's privacy. In response to "revolving door" allegations, Hogan Lovells clarified that Ramirez's work on behalf of YouTube only applied to the class action lawsuit it faced, not the FTC's probe of the company for child safety concerns.

== See also ==
- List of former commissioners of the Federal Trade Commission
