= Earl W. Kintner =

Federal Trade Commission chair (1912–1991)

Earl Wilson Kintner (November 6, 1912 – December 28, 1991) was the chair of the Federal Trade Commission from June 11, 1959, to March 20, 1961.

Born in Corydon, Indiana, and raised in Princeton, Indiana, Kintner "worked in the farm fields as a boy to help support his family", while attending Princeton High School until his graduation in 1932. He received an A.B. from DePauw University in 1936, followed by a law degree from Indiana University Maurer School of Law in 1938.

Kintner served in the United States Navy during World War II, from 1944 to 1948, remaining in service after the end of the war as a case reviewer for the United Nations War Crimes Commission. He held various government offices before becoming a trial attorney for the Federal Trade Commission in Washington, D.C. in 1948. He served as General Counsel for the FTC from 1953 to 1959, when President Dwight D. Eisenhower appointed Kintner to chairman the FTC, where he remained until 1961.

After leaving the FTC, Kintner became a partner in the Washington, D.C. law firm of Arent Fox Kintner Plotkin & Kahn, retiring from active practice in 1990 but remaining of counsel until his death the following year.

Kintner died from congestive heart failure at Sibley Memorial Hospital, at the age of 79.

Political offices
Preceded by John W. Gwynne	Chairmen of the Federal Trade Commission; 1959–1961	Succeeded by Paul Rand Dixon
