= David A. Clanton =

Federal Trade Commission chair (born 1944)

David A. Clanton (born May 31, 1944) was the acting chair of the Federal Trade Commission from March 4, 1981, to September 25, 1981.

Clanton received a B.A. from Andrews University in 1966, followed by a J.D. from Wayne State University Law School in 1969. In June 1969, Clanton became a legislative assistant to Michigan Senator Robert P. Griffin. He gained admission to the bar in Michigan the following year, and served as minority staff counsel for the United States Senate Committee on Commerce from April 1971 to January 1975. After a brief stint as legislative assistant to the assistant minority leader of the U.S. Senate, Clanton was nominated by President Gerald Ford to a seat on the Federal Trade Commission. President Ronald Reagan named Clanton acting FTC chair in 1981, pending selection of a nominee for the position.

Political offices
Preceded by Michael Pertschuk	Chairmen of the Federal Trade Commission; Acting; 1981–1981	Succeeded by James C. Miller III
