= William Kovacic =

American legal scholar

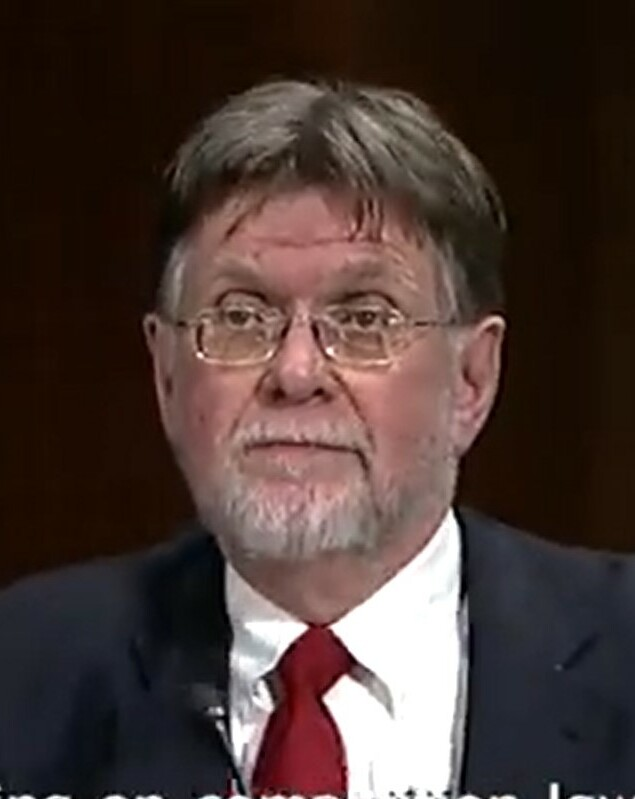
- Kovacic in 2018

Chair of the Federal Trade Commission
- In office March 30, 2008 – March 2, 2009
- President: George W. Bush; Barack Obama
- Preceded by: Deborah Platt Majoras
- Succeeded by: Jon Leibowitz

Member of the Federal Trade Commission
- In office January 4, 2006 – October 3, 2011
- President: George W. Bush; Barack Obama
- Preceded by: Orson Swindle
- Succeeded by: Maureen Ohlhausen

Personal details
- Born: 1952 (age 73–74)
- Party: Republican
- Education: Princeton University (BA); Columbia University (JD)

William Evan Kovacic (born 1952) is an American legal scholar who was a commissioner of the Federal Trade Commission (FTC) from 2006 to 2011, including as its chairman from 2008 to 2009. He is a member of the Republican Party. Kovacic is known for his studies of antitrust law. He is a professor at George Washington University Law School, where he serves as director of their Competition Law Center.

== Early life and education ==
Kovacic was born in 1952. His father was a chemical engineer who worked for the U.S. Department of Energy in Washington, D.C. Kovacic graduated from the University of Detroit Jesuit High School in 1970. He then attended Princeton University, graduating in 1974 with a Bachelor of Arts (B.A.) in public and international affairs.

After college, Kovacic spent one year on the staff of the Senate Committee on the Judiciary Subcommittee on Antitrust and Monopoly. He then attended Columbia Law School, graduating in 1978 with a Juris Doctor degree as a Harlan Fiske Stone Scholar.

== Career ==
From 1979 to 1983, Kovacic served as a staffer within the FTC, first within the Bureau of Competition's Planning Office and later as an attorney and advisor to then-Commissioner George W. Douglas. After leaving the FTC in 1983, Kovacic became an associate at the Washington, D.C., office of international law firm Bryan Cave. At Bryan Cave, Kovacic practiced in the firm's antitrust and government contracts departments.

In 1986, Kovacic joined the faculty of the George Mason University Law School (now Antonin Scalia Law School), where he taught antitrust law. In 1999, Kovacic became E.K. Gubin Professor of Government Contracts Law at George Washington University (GWU) Law School. In 2001, Kovacic rejoined the FTC's staff as the agency's general counsel, serving until 2004.

In 2006, President George W. Bush appointed Kovacic to replace Orson Swindle as a member of the FTC. On March 30, 2008, Kovacic was designated by Bush to serve as FTC Chair, replacing Deborah Platt Majoras. Following the election of Democrat Barack Obama, he was replaced in this capacity after less than a year in office. On March 2, 2009, Democrat Jon Leibowitz replaced him as FTC Chair.

Following his term at the FTC, Kovacic returned to the GWU Law School where he teaches antitrust, contracts, and government contracts. Kovacic currently serves as the director of the Competition Law Center at GWU Law School.

== International advising ==
Since 1992, Kovacic has served as an adviser on antitrust and consumer protection issues to the governments of Armenia, Benin, Egypt, El Salvador, Georgia, Guyana, Indonesia, Kazakhstan, Mongolia, Morocco, Nepal, Panama, Russia, Ukraine, Vietnam, and Zimbabwe. Kovacic also serves on the International Committee of the Institute of Competition Law.

Kovacic was appointed as a Non-Executive Director to the U.K. Competition and Markets Authority (CMA) on July 15, 2013. Kovacic is also a visiting professor at the Dickson Poon School of Law at King's College, London.

== Personal life ==
Kovacic lives in Virginia, with his wife Kathryn Fenton, an antitrust attorney.

== Selected works ==
=== Articles ===
- Kovacic, William E. (1982). "The Federal Trade Commission and Congressional Oversight of Antitrust Enforcement". Tulsa Law Journal. 17 (4): 587–671.
- —; Hurwitz, James D. (1982). "Judicial Analysis of Predation: The Emerging Trends". Vanderbilt Law Review. 35 (1): 63–158.
- — (1989). "Failed Expectations: The Troubled Past and Uncertain Future of the Sherman Act As a Tool for Deconcentration" (PDF). Iowa Law Review. 74 (5): 1105–50.
- —; Shapiro, Carl (2000). "Antitrust Policy: A Century of Economic and Legal Thinking" (PDF). Journal of Economic Perspectives. 14 (1): 43–60. doi:10.1257/jep.14.1.43. Archived (PDF) from the original on 2022-10-09.
- — (2003). "The Modern Evolution of U.S. Competition Policy Enforcement Norms". Antitrust Law Journal. 71 (2): 377–478.
- — (2007). "The Intellectual DNA of Modern U.S. Competition Law for Dominant Firm Conduct: The Chicago/Harvard Double Helix". Columbia Business Law Review. 2007 (1): 1–82.
- — (2009). "Rating the Agencies: What Constitutes Good Performance". George Mason Law Review. 16 (4): 903–26.
- —; Marshall, Robert C.; Marx, Leslie M. (2011). "Plus Factors and Agreement in Antitrust Law". Michigan Law Review. 110 (3): 393–436.

== See also ==
- US antitrust law
- EU competition law
- List of former FTC commissioners
