= Muris =

Muris is both a given name and a surname. Notable people with the name include:

- Muris Mešanović (born 1990), Bosnian footballer
- Timothy Muris (born 1949), American lawyer
- Johannes de Muris (c. 1290–1295 – 1344), French mathematician
