= Deborah K. Owen =

American attorney

Deborah Kaye Owen

Commissioner of the Federal Trade Commission
- In office October 25, 1989 – August 26, 1994
- President: George H. W. Bush; Bill Clinton
- Preceded by: Margot Machol
- Succeeded by: Robert Pitofsky

Personal details
- Party: Republican
- Education: University of Maryland (BA); Harvard Law School (JD)

Deborah Kaye Owen is an American attorney who served as a member of the Federal Trade Commission (FTC) from October 25, 1989, to August 26, 1994. A member of the Republican Party, Owen served previously as an aide to President Ronald Reagan.

== Early life and education ==
Owen received her Bachelor of Arts from the University of Maryland in 1972 and her Juris Doctor degree from Harvard Law School in 1977. Owen also attended the University of Edinburgh as a Marshall Scholar from 1972 to 1974.

== Career ==
In the early 1980s, Owen served as the General Counsel of the Senate Committee on the Judiciary. Owen has been described as a protege of Senator Strom Thurmond of South Carolina. From 1985 to 1986, Owen served as Associate Counsel to the President during the Reagan Administration.

=== Federal Trade Commission (FTC) ===
In 1989, Owen was nominated by President George H. W. Bush to succeed Margot Machol as a member of the Federal Trade Commission (FTC). As a member of the FTC, Owen opposed the agency filing an antitrust lawsuit against Microsoft. Owens notably joined Commissioners Mary Azcuenaga and Roscoe B. Starek III in a 3–2 majority to drop the FTC's investigation of cigarette company Camel's advertising practices.

=== Post-FTC Career ===
Owen resigned in 1994 in order to become a partner at Arent Fox, a corporate law firm, and was replaced in her position by Robert Pitofsky. In 1995, she was profiled by The Washington Post in an article about the legal profession's adaptation to the digital world and how some lawyers felt uncomfortable using personal computers. Owens explained that early in her career, she was reprimanded for using a computer to type, stating that she was told by superiors "in no uncertain terms that lawyers don't type".
