= Everette MacIntyre =

American government official (1901–1997)

Alfonso Everette MacIntyre (February 3, 1901 – June 5, 1997) was a member of the United States Federal Trade Commission from 1961 to 1973, serving as acting chair from August 8, 1970, to September 14, 1970.

== Early life and education ==
Born near Burlington, North Carolina, MacIntyre received a B.A. in political science from the University of North Carolina at Chapel Hill, followed by a J.D. from the George Washington University Law School.

== Biography ==
He became a trial lawyer for the FTC in 1930, eventually becoming chief of the FTC antitrust trials division. From 1955 to 1961, he worked for the United States House Committee on Small Business. In 1961, President John F. Kennedy appointed MacIntyre to the Federal Trade Commission, and in 1968, President Lyndon B. Johnson reappointed MacIntyre for another term.

In 1968, MacIntyre dissented from an FTC recommendation to ban cigarette advertising on radio and television, though he denied his disagreement with the ban was influenced by his roots in North Carolina, a tobacco producing state. MacIntyre served as acting chair of the commission from August 8, 1970, to September 14, 1970, and was succeeded in the role by Miles Kirkpatrick.

In 1971, President Richard Nixon issued an executive order to permit MacIntyre to remain on the Commission beyond the mandatory retirement age of 70, and MacIntyre thereafter remained in that office until 1973.

== Later life and death ==
MacIntyre's wife, Reita, died in 1995, after 66 years of marriage. MacIntyre died two years later in Boca Raton, Florida, at the age of 96.

Political offices
| Preceded by Caspar Weinberger | Chairmen of the Federal Trade Commission; Acting; 1970–1970 | Succeeded by Miles W. Kirkpatrick |
