= VMFA-235 =

Marine Fighter Attack Squadron 235
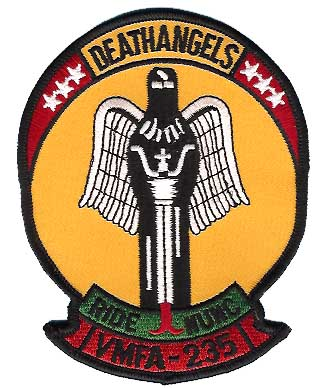
- VMFA-235 Insignia
- Active: 1 January 1943 – 14 June 1996
- Country: United States
- Allegiance: United States of America
- Branch: United States Marine Corps
- Type: Attack
- Role: Close air support Air interdiction Aerial reconnaissance
- Part of: Deactivated
- Nickname: "Death Angels"
- Mottos: "Ride Nunc" "Laugh Now"
- Tail Code: DB
- Engagements: World War II; Operation Cartwheel; Battle of Bougainville; Vietnam War; Operation Desert Storm

Marine Fighter Attack Squadron 235 (VMFA-235) was a United States Marine Corps squadron that most recently flew F/A-18 Hornets. Known as the "Death Angels", the squadron participated in action during World War II, the Vietnam War, Operation Desert Storm and was decommissioned on 14 June 1996.

== History ==
=== World War II ===
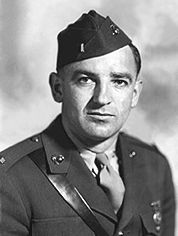
Joseph McCarthy in his U.S. Marine Corps uniform

The unit was commissioned on 1 January 1943 at Marine Corps Air Station El Toro, California as Fixed Wing Marine Scout Bombing Squadron 235 (VMSB-235). During World War II they flew the SBD Dauntless and participated in Operation Cartwheel, the Battle of Bougainville and operations in and around Rabaul. The squadron was decommissioned on 10 November 1944.

During 8,000 hours of flying operations, the squadron had only one casualty; an aircraft ground-looped while landing, breaking the pilot's arm. The squadron's most notable member in this period was future senator Joseph McCarthy, who served as its intelligence officer until July 1944. He participated in eleven missions as a rear gunner, leading to his later nickname of "Tail-Gunner Joe".

=== 1950s ===
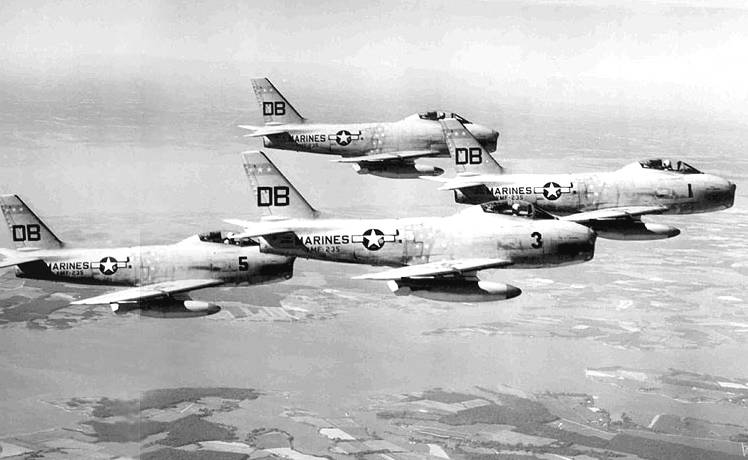
FJ-3 Furies of VMF-235, 1957

The squadron was recalled to active duty in September 1950 as part of Marine Aircraft Group 15 at MCAS El Toro flying the F4U Corsair. In September 1952 they transitioned to the F9F Panther and in March 1954 they again transitioned to the FJ Fury. In 1957 the squadron relocated to Marine Corps Air Station Beaufort.

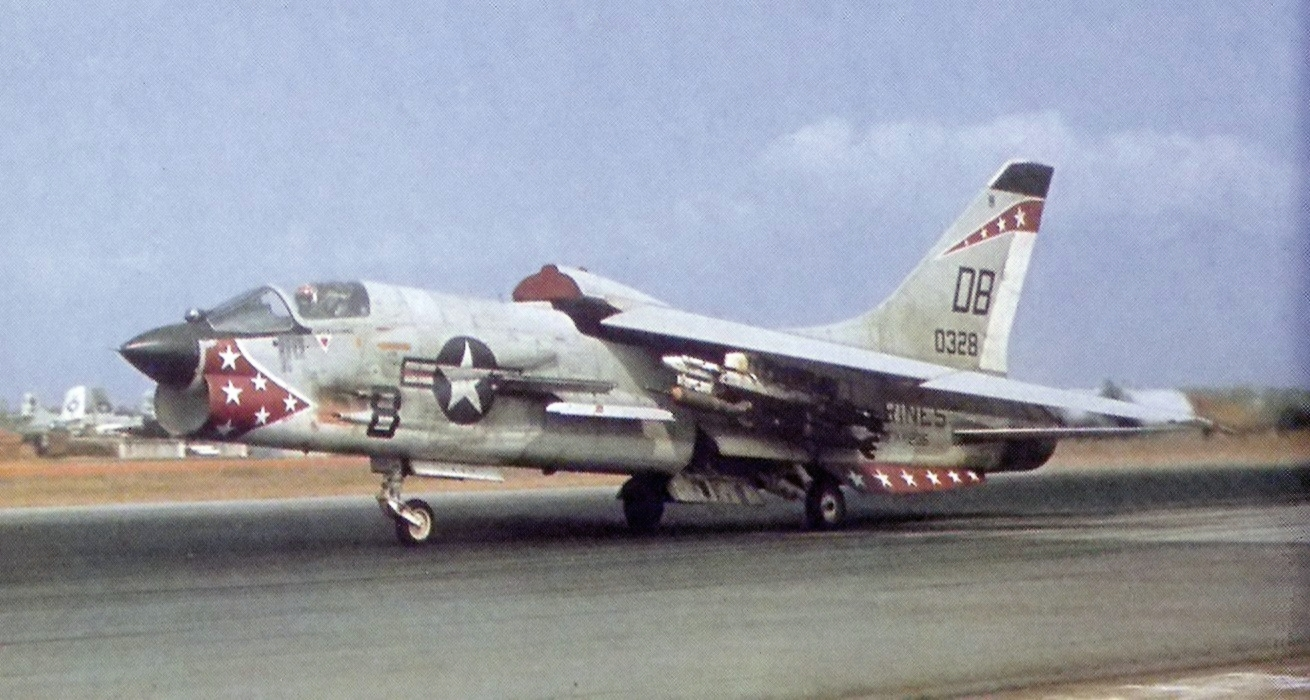
A VMF(AW)-235 F-8E at Da Nang Air Base, South Vietnam, in 1966

=== The Vietnam War ===
Redesignated Fixed Wing Marine Fighter (All Weather) Squadron VMF(AW)-235 deployed to Vietnam on 1 February 1966 flying the F-8E Crusader. Between 2 February – 15 November 1966 the "Death Angels" flew over 6,000 combat sorties in support of over 22 major operations. They returned to Vietnam on 15 February 1967 this time for over a year until 11 May 1968. They were the last active duty Crusader squadron. Upon leaving Vietnam, the squadron moved to Marine Corps Air Station Kaneohe Bay. On 6 September 1968 they were redesignated Fixed Wing Marine Fighter Attack Squadron VMFA-235 and equipped with the F-4 Phantom.

=== The 1980s & 1990s ===
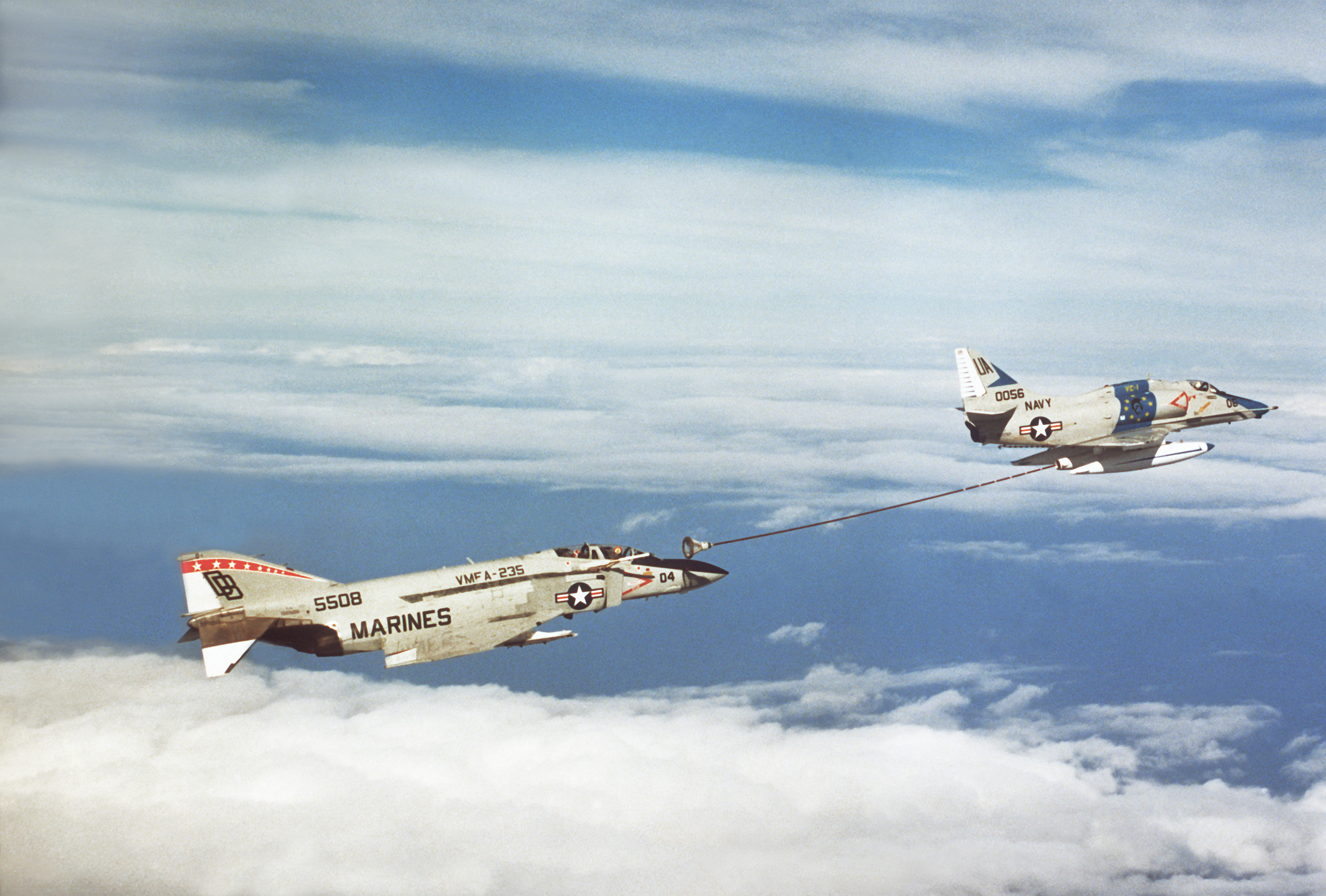
VMFA-235 F-4J refueling from a A-4E Skyhawk of Fleet Composite Squadron 1 (VC-1) in 1977

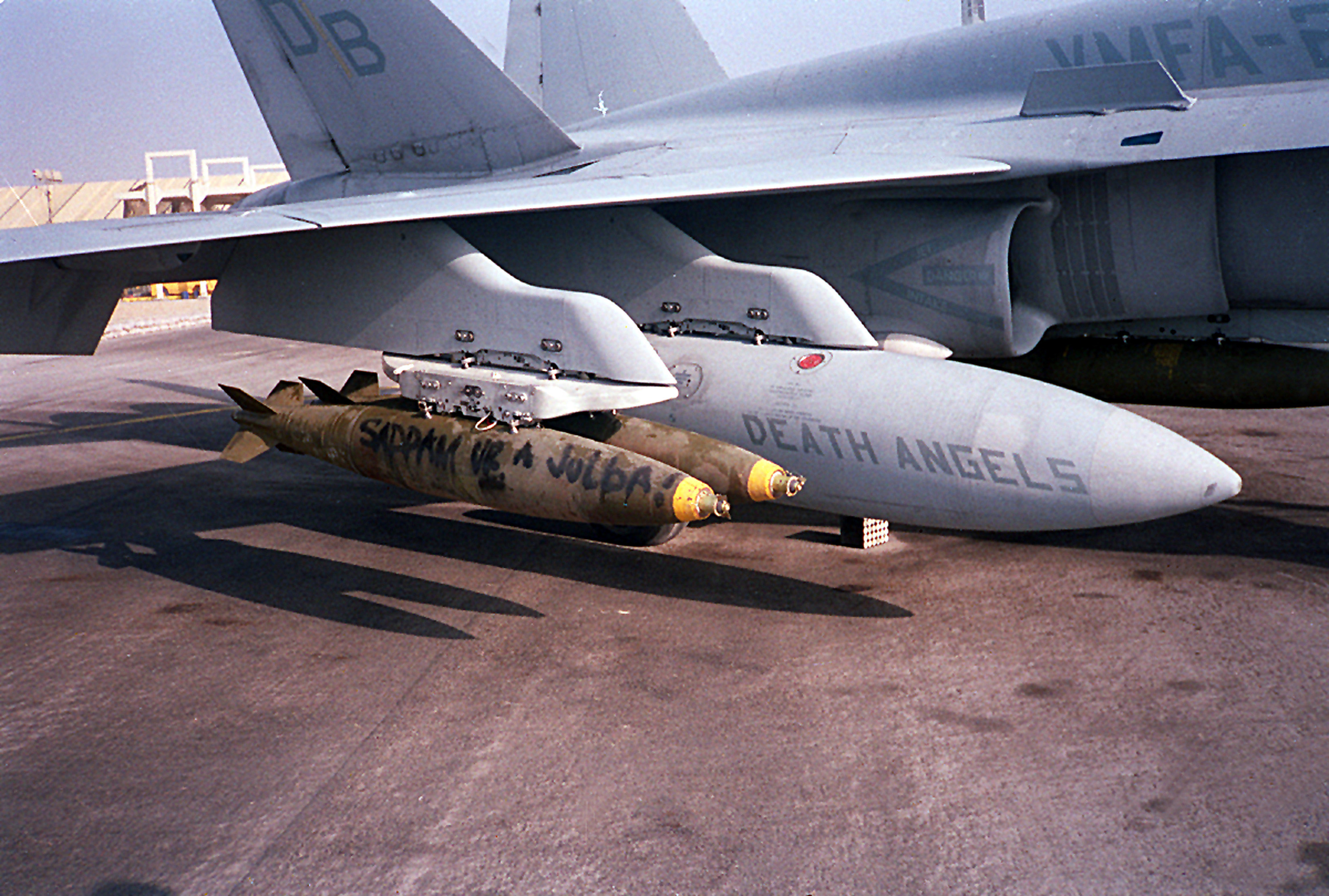
Ordnance on a VMFA-235 Hornet during Operation Desert Storm, 1991.

In November 1989, VMFA-235 transitioned to the F/A-18 Hornet. After Iraq’s invasion of Kuwait in August 1990, the squadron was deployed to the Shaikh Isa Air Base, Bahrain, on 22 August 1990 in support of Operation Desert Shield. They were the first Fighter squadron in theater, and were recognized with the "Phoenix Award", a highly prestigious Department of Defense award, for outstanding performance. During Operation Desert Storm they flew over 2800 sorties in support of coalition forces. In March, 1990, after seven months of operations, VMFA-235 redeployed to Marine Corps Base Hawaii.

The squadron moved to MCAS El Toro in 1994 and was attached to Marine Aircraft Group 11. They moved again to Marine Corps Air Station Miramar in 1996 and were decommissioned later that year on 14 June.

== See also ==
- Orson Swindle
- United States Marine Corps Aviation
- List of active United States Marine Corps aircraft squadrons
- List of decommissioned United States Marine Corps aircraft squadrons
