= Rebecca Kelly Slaughter =

American attorney (born 1983)

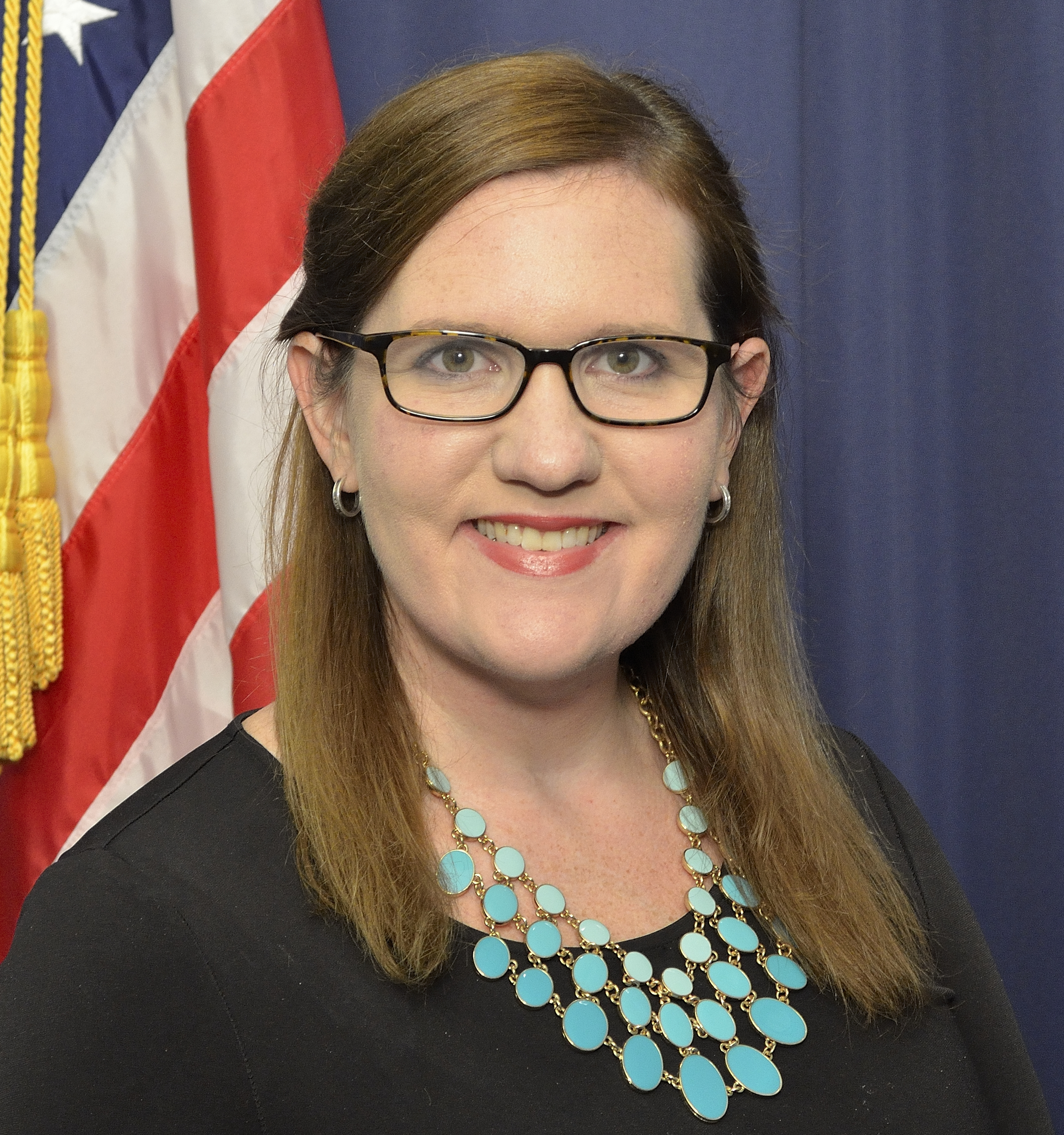
- Official portrait, 2018

Commissioner of the Federal Trade Commission
- In office May 2, 2018 – September 8, 2025; Disputed: March 18, 2025 – June 29, 2026 (Note: President Trump attempted to fire Slaughter on March 18, 2025; Slaughter challenged the firing. SCOTUS temporarily allowed the firing to stand on September 8, 2025, and ultimately upheld it Trump v. Slaughter on June 29, 2026.)
- President: Donald Trump; Joe Biden; Donald Trump
- Preceded by: Edith Ramirez
- Succeeded by: Vacant

Acting Chair of the Federal Trade Commission
- In office January 21, 2021 – June 15, 2021
- President: Joe Biden
- Preceded by: Joseph Simons
- Succeeded by: Lina Khan

Personal details
- Born: Rebecca Joy Kelly; August 6, 1981 (age 45) New York City, New York, U.S.
- Party: Democratic
- Education: Yale University (BA, JD)

Rebecca Joy Kelly Slaughter (née Kelly; born August 6, 1981) is an American attorney who served as a commissioner of the Federal Trade Commission (FTC) from 2018 until her firing in 2025 by President Donald Trump. Slaughter contested the legality of her firing, but the Supreme Court of the United States upheld her removal in Trump v Slaughter. A member of the Democratic Party, she served as acting chair of the Federal Trade Commission from January to June 2021.

== Early life and education ==
Slaughter was born Rebecca Joy Kelly on August 6, 1981, in New York City. She graduated from Yale University in 2003 with a Bachelor of Arts. Slaughter spent a year as a paralegal in the Manhattan District Attorney's Office before attending Yale Law School, where she was an editor of The Yale Law Journal. She graduated in 2008 with a Juris Doctor degree.

== Career ==
Slaughter was an associate in the Washington, D.C. office of Sidley Austin, an American law firm, before entering federal service. She served as a longtime policy counsel to Chuck Schumer, a United States Senator from the state of New York since 1999, before her role at the Federal Trade Commission starting in 2018.

=== Federal Trade Commission ===
She accepted the appointment to a Democratic seat on the Federal Trade Commission in 2018 during the first Trump presidency. In this capacity, she filled the seat left vacant by Edith Ramirez. Slaughter prioritized broader enforcement measures related to artificial intelligence and data privacy. She chaired the Federal Trade Commission from January 21, 2021 to June 15, 2021.

Slaughter was nominated by President Joe Biden for a second term as commissioner on February 13, 2023. Shortly after her appointment to the seat, she gave birth to her third child, making her the first woman to give birth while serving on the FTC. Slaughter was considered for the role of permanent agency chair under President Biden, but the position instead went to Lina Khan.

==== Removal ====
Slaughter was fired by President Donald Trump on March 18, 2025, along with the other Democratic commissioner Alvaro Bedoya, in contrast of the precedent set by Humphrey's Executor v. United States. Slaughter stated: "The President illegally fired me from my position as a Federal Trade Commissioner, violating the plain language of a statute and clear Supreme Court precedent".

On July 17, 2025, Slaughter was reinstated to her position by Judge Loren AliKhan of the United States District Court for the District of Columbia. On July 22, that decision was temporarily stayed by the United States Court of Appeals for the District of Columbia Circuit. On September 2, the court of appeals allowed the district court's decision to take effect, ruling in a 2–1 decision that a president may not fire an FTC commissioner without cause. On September 8, the Supreme Court of the United States temporarily stayed the lower court's decision, following a September 4 request from the Trump administration asking that he be permitted to remove the commissioner. On June 29, 2026, the Supreme Court upheld her removal in Trump v. Slaughter.

== Personal life ==
Slaughter lives in Maryland with her husband, Justin Slaughter. They have four children.
