= James C. Miller III =

American politician

Jim Miller
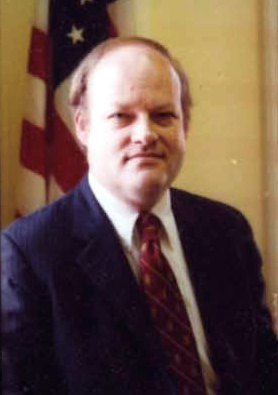

Chair of the Board of Governors of the United States Postal Service
- In office January 11, 2005 – January 30, 2008
- President: George W. Bush
- Preceded by: S. David Fineman
- Succeeded by: Alan C. Kessler

Member of the Board of Governors of the United States Postal Service
- In office April 22, 2003 – 2012
- President: George W. Bush; Barack Obama
- Preceded by: Einar V. Dyhrkopp
- Succeeded by: Roman Martinez IV

26th Director of the Office of Management and Budget
- In office October 8, 1985 – October 16, 1988
- President: Ronald Reagan
- Deputy: Joe Wright
- Preceded by: David Stockman
- Succeeded by: Joe Wright

Chair of the Federal Trade Commission
- In office September 26, 1981 – October 4, 1985
- President: Ronald Reagan
- Preceded by: Michael Pertschuk
- Succeeded by: Daniel Oliver

Administrator of the Office of Information and Regulatory Affairs
- In office January 1981 – September 1981
- President: Ronald Reagan
- Preceded by: Position established
- Succeeded by: Christopher DeMuth

Personal details
- Born: James Clifford Miller III; June 25, 1942 (age 84) Atlanta, Georgia, US
- Party: Republican
- Spouse: DeMaris Humphries (m. 1961)
- Children: 3
- Education: University of Georgia (BBA); University of Virginia (MA, PhD)
- Website: Official website

James Clifford Miller III (born June 25, 1942, in Atlanta, Georgia) is an American economist and former government official who served as chairman of the Federal Trade Commission (FTC) between 1981 and 1985 and as Budget Director for President Ronald Reagan between 1985 and 1988. Miller was the first member of the FTC with a background as a career economist, as opposed to a legal background as is common.

He also ran for United States Senate in Virginia, losing the Republican nomination at the convention to Oliver North in 1994 and losing the nomination in the primary to John Warner in 1996.

== Early years and education ==
Miller was born in Atlanta and grew up in Conyers, Georgia. He earned a BBA in economics from the University of Georgia in 1964 and a PhD in economics from the University of Virginia in 1969.

Between 1977 and 1981, Miller was a resident scholar at the Center for the Study of Government Regulation at the American Enterprise Institute. From 1978 to 1981, he served as co-director of the center.

== Public service ==
Miller was the first administrator of the Office of Information and Regulatory Affairs (April - October 1981) and the executive director of Vice President George H. W. Bush's Presidential Task Force on Regulatory Relief. From 1981 to 1985, he chaired the Federal Trade Commission. Under his leadership, the agency approved several mergers. From October 1985 to October 1988, Miller was director of the United States Office of Management and Budget.

He is a distinguished fellow at the Center for Study of Public Choice at George Mason University. He is also a senior fellow of the Hoover Institution at Stanford University.

== Private sector ==
He has been counselor to and a board member of the former Citizens for a Sound Economy (1988–2002), a member of the boards of the Tax Foundation and the Progress and Freedom Foundation, and a member of the board of visitors of George Mason University and the U.S. Air Force Academy. In addition, Miller has been a director of LECG Economics-Finance, a member of the board of Independence Air, a member of the board of Washington Mutual Investors Fund, a member of the board of the Tax-Exempt Fund of Maryland, a member of the board of the Tax-Exempt Fund of Virginia, a member of the board of the J.P. Morgan Value Opportunities Fund, a member of the board of Clean Energy, a consultant to Freddie Mac, and chairman of the board of Economic Impact Analysts, Inc. (family-held consulting firm).

From 2003 to 2006, Miller was chairman (or chairman emeritus) of the Capital Analysis Group (CapAnalysis), a division of the international law firm Howrey LLP. He was a member of the Board of Governors of the United States Postal Service (2003–2012), where he was elected chairman in 2005, 2006, and 2007.

On November 9, 2009, it was announced that Miller was picked by the then Premier of the Cayman Islands William McKeeva Bush to lead an independent task force to examine new revenue options for the Cayman Islands Government. The Cayman Islands has no direct taxation although that may change as a result of an agreement with the United Kingdom Foreign and Commonwealth Office. The UK FCO allowed the Cayman Islands Government to borrow additional funds to meet capital and operational expenses as long as the Government agreed to look at ways in which to increase and stabilize its revenue base—direct taxation being the preferred solution.

== See also ==
- List of former FTC commissioners

Political offices
| Preceded by David Stockman | Director of the Office of Management and Budget; 1985–1988 | Succeeded by Joe Wright |
