= Roscoe B. Starek III =

American attorney

Roscoe Burton Starek III

Commissioner of the Federal Trade Commission
- In office November 19, 1990 – September 25, 1997
- President: George H. W. Bush; Bill Clinton
- Preceded by: Terry Calvani
- Succeeded by: Orson Swindle

Personal details
- Born: November 17, 1947 (age 78) Minneapolis, Minnesota
- Party: Republican
- Education: Syracuse University (B.A.); Washington College of Law (J.D.)

Roscoe Burton Starek III (born November 17, 1947) is an American attorney who served as a member of the Federal Trade Commission (FTC) from 1990 to 1997.

== Early life and education ==
Starek was born on November 17, 1947, in Minneapolis, Minnesota. Starek graduated with a bachelor's degree (A.B.) in political science from Syracuse University in 1969. Following the completion of his undergraduate education, Starek attended the Washington College of Law at American University, where he received his Juris Doctor (J.D.) degree in 1973. Between 1969 and 1975, Starek was a member of the U.S. Army Reserve.

== Government career ==
From 1972 to 1982, Starek worked in various positions on Capitol Hill and the White House staff of Gerald Ford. During the Ronald Reagan Administration, he served for seven years in the Department of State, eventually achieving the position of Deputy Assistant Secretary for Policy and Counterterrorism.

Following George H. W. Bush's victory in the 1988 United States presidential election, he joined the President-elect's transition team as deputy director of Presidential Personnel. Starek stayed on Bush's team following his presidential inauguration, joining the White House as deputy assistant to the president. In this capacity, Starek urged the White House to take a more aggressive stance towards confirming judicial nominees.

A Republican, Starek was nominated by Bush to replace Terry Calvani as a member of the Federal Trade Commission (FTC), and took office on November 19, 1990. During the FTC's probe of Microsoft, Starek recused himself, citing financial conflicts of interest. Starek's term expired on September 25, 1997, and he was replaced as a member of the FTC by Orson Swindle.
