= Harold R. Collier =

American politician

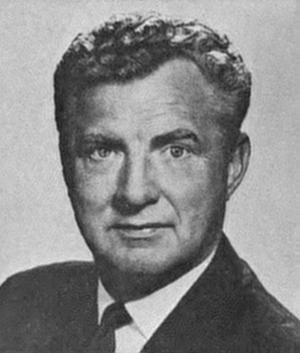

Member of the U.S. House of Representatives from Illinois
- In office January 3, 1957 – January 3, 1975
- Preceded by: Richard W. Hoffman
- Succeeded by: Henry Hyde
- Constituency: 10th district (1957-1973); 6th district (1973-1975)

Personal details
- Born: December 12, 1915 Lansing, Michigan
- Died: January 17, 2006 (aged 90) West Palm Beach, Florida
- Party: Republican

Harold Reginald Collier (December 12, 1915 – January 17, 2006) was a Republican member of the United States House of Representatives from Illinois.

Collier was born and raised in Lansing, Michigan. He attended and graduated from Morton College in Cicero, Illinois. After earning his degree, he was hired by the publishing company that created Life Magazine and worked in the editorial department. In 1941, he began what would be a ten-year career as a marketing executive for Match Corporation of America. In 1951, he was elected to the Berwyn, Illinois city council and also began a new career as public relations director for McAlear Manufacturing.

In 1952, Collier was an unsuccessful candidate for Illinois Secretary of State. In 1953, he was elected as Township Supervisor of Berwyn Township. In 1957, Collier won an election for a seat in Congress. He was a longtime member of the House Ways and Means Committee. A fiscal conservative, he was a strong advocate of a balanced budget. Collier was admired by colleagues in both parties, as he was excellent at finding compromise ground between two sides on issues. Collier voted in favor of the Civil Rights Acts of 1957, 1960, 1964, and 1968, but voted against the Voting Rights Act of 1965 and the Endangered Species Act of 1973 and did not vote on the 24th Amendment to the U.S. Constitution.

In 1975, Collier retired from Congress. He moved to West Palm Beach, Florida, where he died on January 17, 2006. Collier's son, Calvin J. Collier, served a term as chairman of the Federal Trade Commission in the 1970s.

U.S. House of Representatives
Preceded by Richard W. Hoffman	Member of the U.S. House of Representatives from Illinois's 10th congressional district 1957–1973	Succeeded by Samuel H. Young
Preceded by George W. Collins	Member of the U.S. House of Representatives from Illinois's 6th congressional district 1973–1975	Succeeded by Henry Hyde
