= Trump v. Slaughter =

- Supreme Court of the United States

Argued December 8, 2025 Decided June 29, 2026
- Full case name: Donald J. Trump, et al. v. Rebecca Kelly Slaughter, et al.
- Docket no.: 25-332
- Citations: 609 U.S. 422 (more)

Case history
- Prior: Motion for Summary Judgment granted. Rebecca Slaughter et al v. Donald Trump et al, No. 1:25-cv-00909 (D.D.C) July 17, 2025.; stay pending appeal denied

Holding
- A subordinate who exercises the President's power is subject to removal by him, and the Constitution's separation of powers prohibits Congress from requiring the President to have cause before removing a subordinate.

Court membership
- Chief Justice John Roberts Associate Justices Clarence Thomas · Samuel Alito; Sonia Sotomayor · Elena Kagan; Neil Gorsuch · Brett Kavanaugh; Amy Coney Barrett · Ketanji Brown Jackson

Case opinions
- Majority: Roberts, joined by Alito, Gorsuch, Kavanaugh, Barrett; Thomas (except Part III–B)
- Concurrence: Gorsuch
- Dissent: Sotomayor, joined by Kagan, Jackson
- This case overturned a previous ruling or rulings
- Humphrey's Executor v. United States (1935)

Trump v. Slaughter, 609 U.S. 422 (2026), is a landmark United States Supreme Court decision regarding the constitutionality of statutory removal protections for the Federal Trade Commission (FTC) previously upheld in Humphrey's Executor v. United States (1935) and whether a federal court may prevent removal from public office.

Humphrey's Executor had generally held that commissioners of independent agencies within the executive branch of the government that served a "quasi-legislative" or "quasi-judicial" purpose could not be removed at will by the president. Early in his second term, Trump made several firings of independent agencies, including Rebecca Kelly Slaughter, a Democratic commissioner on the FTC, without any direct cause.

The Supreme Court stayed lower court injunctions that had blocked the firing, and on June 29, 2026, issued a 6–3 holding along the Court's ideological lines that the president had the power to remove independent agency heads at will, overturning Humphrey's Executor. The only exception to this are the members of the Federal Reserve Board, as determined by Trump v. Cook decided the same day, due to the significant impact the Board has on the U.S. economy.

== Background ==
=== Humphrey's Executor ===
For-cause removal litigation at the Supreme Court addresses the constitutional boundaries of Congress's authority to limit the President's power to remove executive officers. In Humphrey's Executor v. United States (1935), the Court upheld statutory provisions restricting presidential removal of Federal Trade Commissioners to instances of "inefficiency, neglect of duty, or malfeasance in office". Distinguishing Myers v. United States (1926), which invalidated limits on removal of a post performing exclusively executive functions, the Court emphasized that the Federal Trade Commission (FTC) exercised quasi-legislative and quasi-judicial duties. On this basis, the Court concluded that Congress could provide tenure protections to preserve the independence of such bodies.

=== Later cases ===
During the twenty-first century, conservative justices declined to apply the Humphrey's Executor framework, instead focusing on whether removal restrictions impeded the President's ability to perform his constitutional duties. In Morrison v. Olson (1988), the Court sustained the independent counsel statute, holding that for-cause removal restrictions for a special prosecutor did not impermissibly interfere with the President's constitutional role, but did not rely on the "quasi judicial" and "quasi legislative" framework of Humphrey's Executor. More recent decisions of the Roberts Court further eroded Humphrey's precedential value. In Free Enterprise Fund v. Public Company Accounting Oversight Board (2010), the Court invalidated a statutory scheme that subjected Board members to two layers of for-cause protection, finding that such "double insulation" unduly limited presidential oversight. In Seila Law LLC v. Consumer Financial Protection Bureau (2020), the Court further limited Humphrey's Executor, holding that Congress may not insulate single-director independent agencies with significant executive authority from presidential removal at will. Collins v. Yellen (2021) extended this reasoning to the Federal Housing Finance Agency.

The Court's decisions delineated a line between permissible and impermissible removal restrictions. While Humphrey's Executor continued to authorize for-cause protections for members of multimember commissions exercising adjudicatory or regulatory functions, more recent decisions emphasized that restrictions on principal officers who wield substantial executive power are inconsistent with constitutional separation of powers.

== Lower court history ==
Part of the goal of the conservative political initiative Project 2025, which supported the second term of President Donald Trump, was to overturn Humphrey's Executor. In March 2025, president Donald Trump fired two members of the Federal Trade Commission, Rebecca Slaughter and Alvaro Bedoya, who were affiliated with the Democratic Party. On March 27, Slaughter and Bedoya sued Trump, alleging that their removals were unlawful. On July 17, Judge Loren AliKhan of the U.S. District Court for the District of Columbia held that the attempt to remove Slaughter was unlawful. The court reinstated her to her position and enjoined the government from interfering with her ability to perform her duties. The court emphasized that the removal protections for FTC Commissioners (for cause only) remain valid under current Supreme Court doctrine. The government sought stays of that order. Initially, the District Court denied emergency stay requests. Then, on September 2, the U.S. Court of Appeals for the D.C. Circuit denied a request by the Department of Justice to block Slaughter from returning to work. The appeals court noted that the government was unlikely to succeed on the merits because Supreme Court precedent is binding and directly applicable.

== Preliminary stay ==
The Trump administration requested a stay of the reinstatement order on September 4, 2025. On September 8, Chief Justice John Roberts granted an administrative stay while referring the request to the full court. On September 22, the Supreme Court granted the stay, issued certiorari before judgment, and set oral arguments for December. The three liberal justices, Elena Kagan, Sonia Sotomayor and Ketanji Brown Jackson, dissented from the stay.

== Oral arguments ==
Oral arguments were heard December 8, 2025. Court observers said that the court's conservative majority appeared to favor Trump's position, and were likely to overturn or weaken Humphrey's. Justice Roberts stated that "Humphrey's Executor is just a dried husk of whatever people used to think it was ... It was addressing an agency that had very little, if any, executive power, and that may be why they were able to attract such a broad support on the court at the time." The dissenting justices said that the overturning or weakening of Humphrey's would give the president far more power than even kings or the Parliament of Great Britain at the time of the U.S.' founding. Justice Jackson said that "having a president come in and fire all the scientists, and the doctors, and the economists and the PhDs, and replacing them with loyalists and people who don't know anything is actually not in the best interest of the citizens of the United States."

== Holding ==
On June 29, 2026, the Supreme Court ruled that the Federal Trade Commission's for-cause protections were unconstitutional. The court held that a subordinate who exercises the President's power is subject to removal by him, and the Constitution's separation of powers prohibits Congress from requiring the President to have cause before removing a subordinate. In doing so, it explicitly overruled Humphrey's Executor in its entirety.

== Analysis ==
Constitutional law scholar Erwin Chemerinsky said that, as a result of the ruling, "agency independence is now gone". Law professor Michael Gerhardt said that it had taken "years of planning by conservative groups" to overrule Humphrey's Executor. Steve Schwinn predicted the "hyper-politicization of previously independent federal agencies."

== See also ==
- Appointments Clause
- Civil service independence
- Executive aggrandizement in democratic backsliding
- Independent agencies of the United States federal government
- Legal affairs of the second Trump presidency
- Officer of the United States
- Trump v. Cook (2025)
- Unitary executive theory
