= Alvaro Bedoya =

American attorney (born 1982)

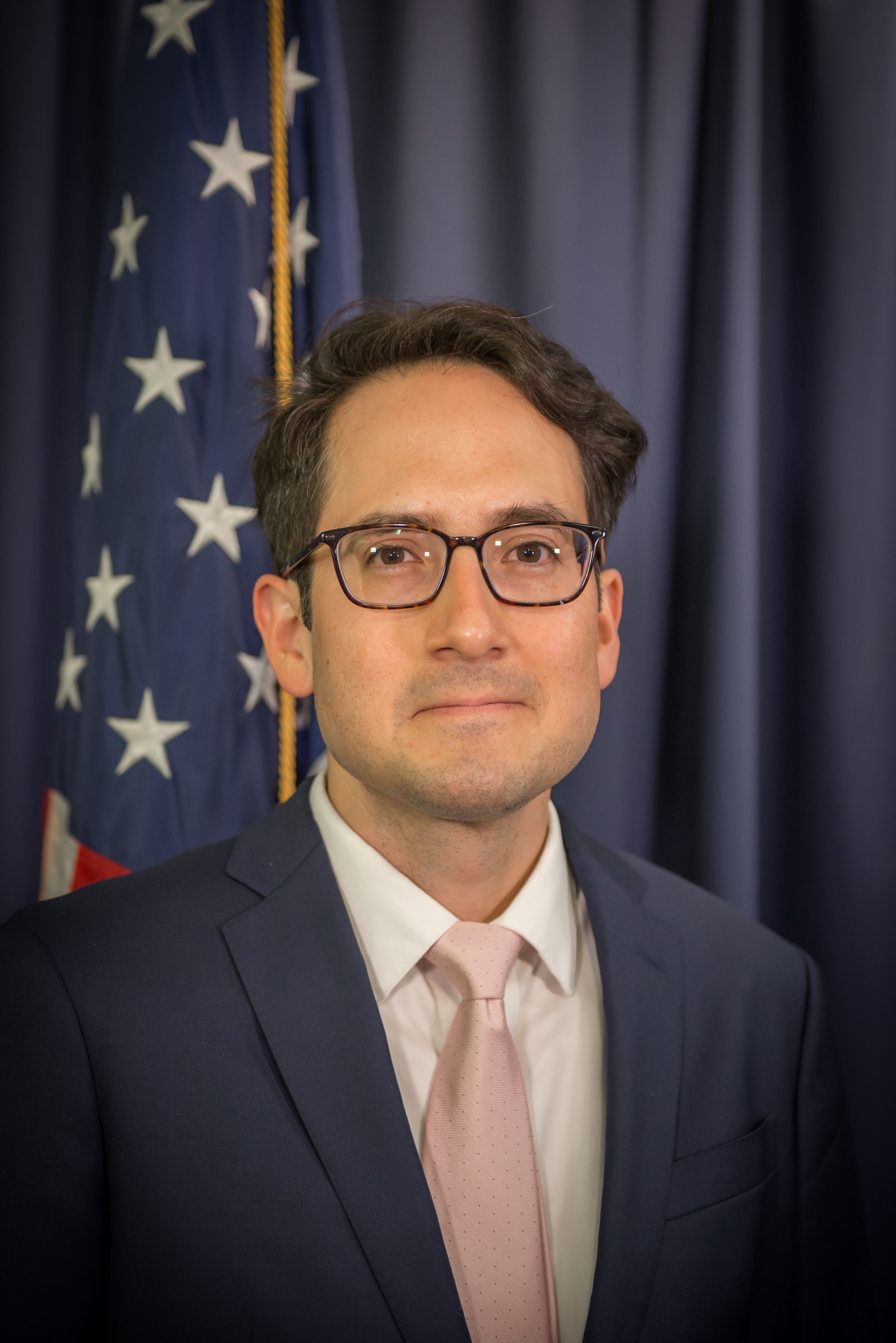
- Bedoya in 2022

Commissioner of the Federal Trade Commission
- In office May 16, 2022 – June 9, 2025; Disputed: March 18, 2025 – June 9, 2025
- President: Joe Biden; Donald Trump
- Preceded by: Rohit Chopra
- Succeeded by: Vacant

Personal details
- Born: 1982 (age 43–44) Lima, Peru
- Party: Democratic
- Education: Harvard University (BA); Yale University (JD)

Alvaro Martin Bedoya (born February 21, 1982) is an American attorney and government official who served as a commissioner of the Federal Trade Commission (FTC) from 2022 until his purported firing or his resignation in 2025.

Known for his focus on digital privacy issues, Bedoya was the founding director of the Center on Privacy and Technology at the Georgetown University Law Center. Bedoya is a member of the Democratic Party and was nominated to the position by President Joe Biden.

== Early life and education ==
Bedoya was born in 1982 in Lima, Peru, and was raised in Vestal, New York. Bedoya received a Bachelor of Arts degree from Harvard College and a Juris Doctor from Yale Law School. While at Yale, Bedoya served as an Editor on the Yale Law Journal.

During law school, Bedoya worked at the NAACP Legal Defense Fund, Wilmer Hale, and for Senator Ted Kennedy on the Senate Judiciary Subcommittee on Immigration, Refugees, and Border Security.

== Legal career ==
After law school, Bedoya was an associate at Wilmer Hale from 2007 to 2009. He then served as chief counsel to the United States Senate Judiciary Subcommittee on Privacy, Technology and the Law. Bedoya also served as chief counsel to Senator Al Franken (D-MN).

He then founded and directed the Center on Privacy and Technology at Georgetown Law, where he also served as a Professor of Law. Bedoya is known for his opposition to government surveillance, and has argued that the right to privacy is a civil liberty. In a 2018 article in The New York Times, Bedoya criticized Facebook, Google, and other technology companies for alleged violations of user privacy rights. Bedoya advocated for the removal of advertisements for payday loan services on Google, stating that the "internet should not be a place that profits from your weaknesses". From 2019 to 2020, he was a director of Free Press.

Bedoya's work has been published in publications such as The New York Times, The Washington Post, and The Atlantic.

== Federal Trade Commission (FTC) ==
In early 2021, Bedoya was considered by President Joe Biden as a potential nominee to chair the Federal Trade Commission (FTC) seat held by Joseph Simons. However, Lina Khan was instead chosen for this position.

=== Nomination and confirmation ===
In September 2021, Bedoya was nominated for the FTC seat held by Rohit Chopra. Bedoya's nomination was praised by then-FTC Chair Khan, who stated that Bedoya's "expertise on surveillance and data security and his longstanding commitment to public service would be enormously valuable to the Commission" in a press release.

On December 1, 2021, the Senate Commerce Committee deadlocked on his nomination. On March 3, 2022, the committee once again deadlocked on Bedoya's nomination, forcing the full Senate to move to discharge it. On March 30, 2022, his nomination was discharged by the full Senate.

Bedoya was confirmed by the full Senate on May 11, 2022, by a vote of 51-50 with Vice President Kamala Harris casting the tie-breaking vote.

=== Tenure ===
Bedoya was sworn in on May 16, 2022 for a term running until September 25, 2026. According to Politico, Bedoya has been recognized for having "policy expertise on tech-driven consumer harms outside of antitrust", with a particular focus on data privacy issues.

As a member of the FTC, Bedoya has advocated for reviving enforcement of the Robinson–Patman Act, a 1936 law that prohibits price discrimination. Alongside Democratic colleagues Khan and Rebecca Slaughter, Bedoya voted in favor of bringing an antitrust lawsuit against Meta's acquisition of Within in 2022.

=== Removal ===
On March 18, 2025, before the formal end of his term, both Bedoya and fellow Commissioner Rebecca Slaughter were fired by President Donald Trump. After learning of his dismissal, Bedoya challenged the legality of Trump's action, arguing that President Trump did not have the statutory or constitutional power to fire him, and stated on the social media platform X that "the president wants the FTC to be a lapdog for his golfing buddies". Bedoya kept acting as commissioner until resigning 3 months later. The Supreme Court of the United States later upheld the dismissal of Rebecca Slaughter, whom the President had claimed to fire alongside Bedoya, in Trump v. Slaughter.

== Accolades ==
- 2022 NHMC DC Impact Awards (NHMC Impact Award Digital Advocacy)
