= Columbia Business Law Review =

- Discipline: Business law
- Language: English

Standard abbreviations
- Bluebook: Colum. Bus. L. Rev.
- ISO 4: Columbia Bus. Law Rev.

Columbia Business Law Review (CBLR) is a law journal published by students at Columbia Law School. It is the second most-cited student-edited business law journal and the sixth most-cited business law journal. CBLR publishes three issues each year and includes leading articles in business law and student-written notes. Every year, the third edition includes a series of student notes that survey a particularly timely issue relating to business law.

CBLR is governed by a board of third-year law students who edit the publication. The staff of the review consists of Columbia Law School students who are selected on the basis of academic performance and writing ability. Second-year staff members assist in the substantive production of the Review while also researching and writing a student note on a business-related topic.

== Notable Authors ==
- The Hon. Douglas H. Ginsburg
- Herbert Hovenkamp
- John Coffee
- William B. Chandler III
- Robert J. Jackson
- Richard Epstein
- Robert Rasmussen
- William Kovacic
- Barbara Black
- C. Scott Hemphill
- Joshua D. Wright
- Jack B. Jacobs
- Alicia Davis
