= Andrew N. Ferguson =

American attorney (born 1986)

Andrew Ferguson
- Official portrait, 2024

Chair of the Federal Trade Commission
- Incumbent
- Assumed office January 20, 2025
- President: Donald Trump
- Preceded by: Lina Khan

Commissioner of the Federal Trade Commission
- Incumbent
- Assumed office April 3, 2024
- President: Joe Biden; Donald Trump
- Preceded by: Noah J. Phillips

Solicitor General of Virginia
- In office January 15, 2022 – April 2, 2024
- Governor: Glenn Youngkin
- Preceded by: Michelle Kallen
- Succeeded by: Erika Maley

Personal details
- Born: Andrew Nathan Ferguson; 1986 (age 39–40) Harrisonburg, Virginia, U.S.
- Party: Republican
- Education: University of Virginia (BA, JD); College of William and Mary (attended)

Andrew Nathan Ferguson (born 1986) is an American lawyer who has served as the chair of the Federal Trade Commission since 2025. Ferguson has additionally served as a commissioner of the Federal Trade Commission since 2024. He served as the solicitor general of Virginia from 2022 to 2024.

Ferguson graduated from the University of Virginia with a bachelor's degree in history in 2005 and with a Juris Doctor in 2012. He clerked for Judge Karen L. Henderson of the Court of Appeals for the District of Columbia Circuit and later worked for Covington & Burling and Bancroft. From 2016 to 2017, Ferguson clerked for Justice Clarence Thomas on the Supreme Court.

Ferguson served as a senior special counsel to Iowa senator Chuck Grassley, the chair of the Senate Committee on the Judiciary, amid Brett Kavanaugh's Supreme Court nomination in 2018. He became the committee's chief counsel for nominations in January 2019. Ferguson later served as Senate Majority Leader Mitch McConnell's chief counsel. He was involved the first impeachment trial of Donald Trump and Amy Coney Barrett's Supreme Court nomination. In January 2022, Virginia attorney general Jason Miyares appointed Ferguson as the state's solicitor general.

In July 2023, President Joe Biden nominated Ferguson to serve on the Federal Trade Commission. He was confirmed by the Senate in March 2024 and was sworn in the following month. In December 2024, President-elect Donald Trump named Ferguson as the commission's chair.

== Early life and education (1986–2012) ==
Andrew Nathan Ferguson was born in 1986 in Harrisonburg, Virginia. Ferguson's father served as the executive vice president of Bridgewater College, while his mother was an accounting professor at James Madison University. Ferguson was raised as a Presbyterian. He later converted to Catholicism. Ferguson graduated from the Eastern Mennonite School in 2005. He graduated from the University of Virginia with a bachelor's degree in history in 2009. While attending the University of Virginia, Ferguson interned for Judge Norman K. Moon of the District Court for the Western District of Virginia and the law firm BotkinRose. He initially attended the William & Mary Law School, but transferred to the University of Virginia School of Law, graduating in 2012.

== Career ==
=== Clerkships and private practice (2012–2017) ===
After graduating from the University of Virginia in 2012, Ferguson clerked for Judge Karen L. Henderson of the Court of Appeals for the District of Columbia Circuit. He later worked for Covington & Burling, specializing in antitrust and competition law, and Bancroft as an appellate lawyer. From 2016 to 2017, Ferguson clerked for Justice Clarence Thomas on the Supreme Court.

=== Congressional work (2018–2021) ===
By 2018, Ferguson had served as the senior special counsel to Iowa senator Chuck Grassley, the chair of the Senate Committee on the Judiciary. According to Ferguson, he was motivated to work for the Senate to get Roe v. Wade (1973) overturned. He advised the committee as it considered the nomination of Brett Kavanaugh to the Supreme Court. In January 2019, Grassley's successor, South Carolina senator Lindsey Graham, named Ferguson as the committee's chief counsel for nominations. By October, Ferguson had become Senate Majority Leader Mitch McConnell's chief counsel. He was involved in planning the strategy for the first impeachment trial of Donald Trump and several judicial confirmations, including the nomination of Amy Coney Barrett to the Supreme Court.

=== Solicitor general of Virginia (2022–2024) ===
On December 8, 2021, Jason Miyares, Virginia's attorney general-elect, announced that he would appoint Ferguson to serve as the state's solicitor general. Ferguson argued a case over Governor Glenn Youngkin's mask-optional executive order and was involved in discussions about the prosecution of two United States Park Police officers in the killing of Bijan Ghaisar.

== Commissioner of the Federal Trade Commission (2024–present) ==
In February 2023, Bloomberg News reported that Mitch McConnell had recommended President Joe Biden nominate Ferguson to a vacant seat on the Federal Trade Commission. On July 3, Biden nominated Ferguson and Melissa Holyoak to the commission's two vacancies. Ferguson and Holyoak appeared before the United States Senate Committee on Commerce, Science, and Transportation on September 20. Amid a dispute between McConnell and Missouri senator Josh Hawley, Ferguson's nomination was delayed for several months. He was confirmed by the Senate in March 2024.

Ferguson was sworn in as a commissioner of the Federal Trade Commission on April 3, 2024. That month, he voted against banning worker non-compete clauses. Ferguson later voted against issuing guidance to franchisers warning them not to prevent their franchisees from speaking to the government and not to charge them fees undisclosed in documents for prospective franchise buyers, against a rule that would simplify the process of canceling subscriptions and memberships, and against a final rule barring junk fees.

== Chair of the Federal Trade Commission (2025–present) ==
On December 10, 2024, President-elect Donald Trump named Ferguson as the chair of the Federal Trade Commission. According to The New York Times, Ferguson told members of Trump's transition team that the commission would continue to scrutinize large technology companies, but that he would revert some initiatives promoted by its chair, Lina Khan; Ferguson specifically named the Federal Trade Commission's regulatory agenda against artificial intelligence companies and its higher standards for mergers. In a meeting with Trump at Mar-a-Lago, Ferguson stated that he would use antitrust law to target companies that censor speech. His stated agenda included fighting "wokeness" and investigating hospitals whom he claimed had "deceptively pushed" transgender health care.

Ferguson began serving as the chair of the Federal Trade Commission in January 2025. He moved to close the Federal Trade Commission's internal diversity division and ordered employees to return to the commission's office, citing an executive order Trump had signed. Ferguson's tenure was marked by an alchemy of skepticism towards corporate consolidation—a belief shared by Khan—and traditional Republican beliefs on lighter regulation. He embraced his connection to Trump, referring to the agency publicly as the "Trump-Vance FTC". In February, Ferguson initiated an inquiry into alleged censorship of public platforms. In May, he opened an investigation into Media Matters for America, accusing the organization of organizing an advertiser boycott against Elon Musk's X.

== Views ==
Ferguson is a Republican. In a podcast interview in 2025, he described himself as having been a "conservative that had relatively strong deference for markets and for market actors." Amid the George Floyd protests, as various companies advocated for police reform, Ferguson's views on the free market shifted, and he became more supportive of restraining companies. In his confirmation hearing to serve on the Federal Trade Commission, Ferguson stated that he would support congressional regulations on artificial intelligence. He later stated that the government should allow artificial intelligence to develop before regulating the technology.

Ferguson has accused social media platforms of censoring COVID-19 skepticism and allegations of impropriety surrounding Joe Biden's son, Hunter Biden. He has additionally accused advertisers of leaving platforms out of a disagreement about their direction, a criticism brought by Elon Musk. After Donald Trump's second inauguration, Ferguson echoed Ryan T. Anderson's call to restore his book, When Harry Became Sally (2018), on Amazon.com; the book was reinstated in February 2025.

Ferguson has argued that the Federal Trade Commission is not independent from the president. In March 2025, he affirmed Trump's effort to fire the commission's two Democratic members.
