= Christine S. Wilson =

American attorney (born 1970)

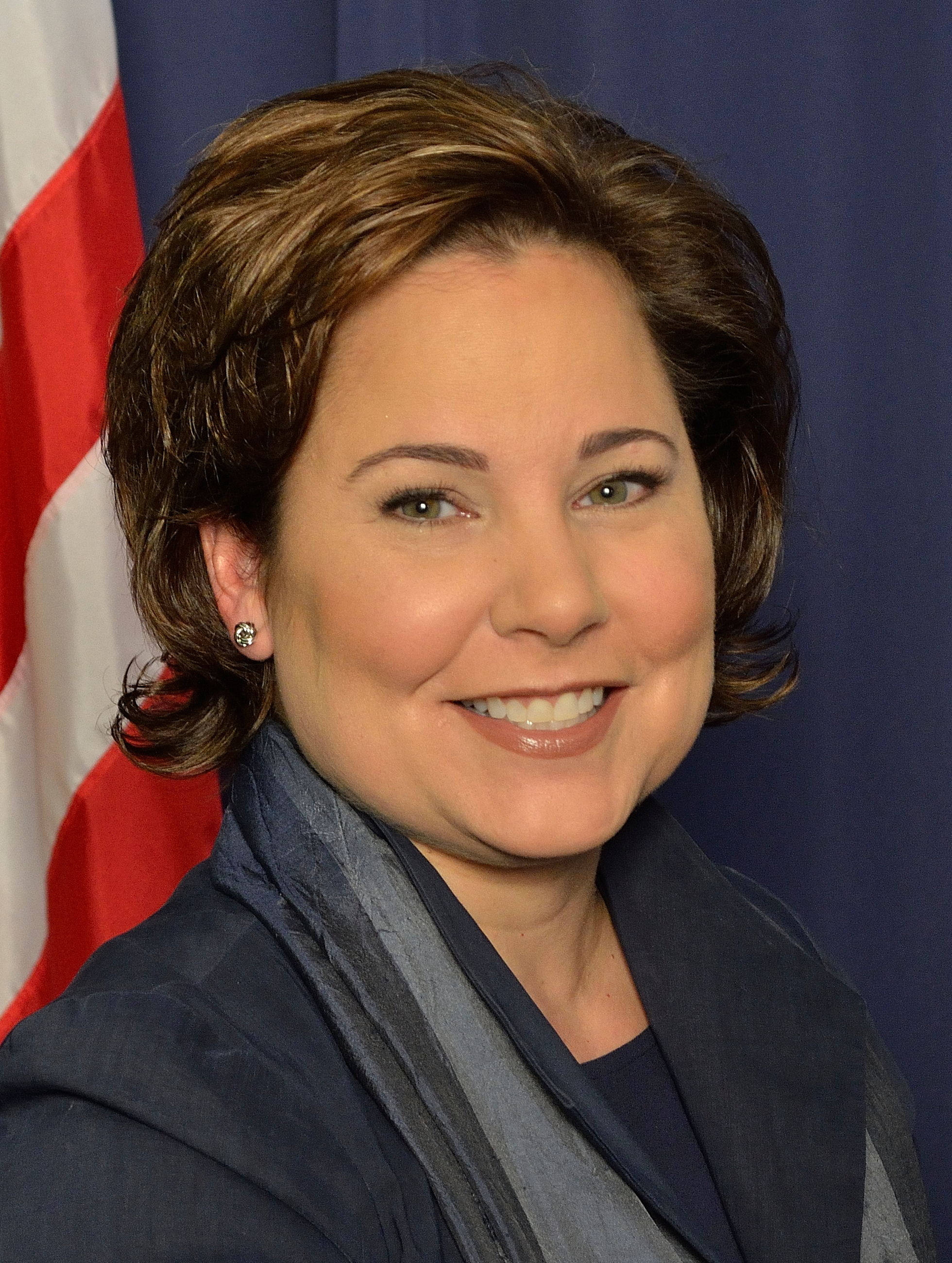

Commissioner of the Federal Trade Commission
- In office September 26, 2018 – March 31, 2023
- President: Donald Trump; Joe Biden
- Preceded by: Maureen Ohlhausen
- Succeeded by: Melissa Holyoak

Personal details
- Born: Christine Alyssa Bishop Smith; May 17, 1970 (age 54); Orlando, Florida
- Political party: Republican
- Education: University of Florida (BA); Georgetown University (JD)

Christine Smith Wilson (born May 15, 1970) is an American attorney and former government official. A member of the Republican Party, Wilson was appointed by President Donald Trump in 2018 to serve on the Federal Trade Commission (FTC). Wilson resigned from the FTC in 2023.

== Early life and education ==
Christine Alyssa Bishop Smith was born May 15, 1970, in Orlando, Florida. Wilson received her undergraduate degree from the University of Florida and studied law at the Georgetown University Law Center, where she graduated cum laude.

While at Georgetown, she served as a law clerk at the FTC Bureau of Competition, and later joined the agency as chief of staff to FTC Chair Tim Muris. During this period, she became an associate of future U.S. Senator Ted Cruz, who at the time was serving as head of the Office of Policy Planning within the FTC. Wilson later became a donor to Cruz's 2012 Senate and 2016 presidential campaigns.

== Legal career ==
In private practice, Wilson served as Senior Vice President for Legal, Regulatory & International for Delta Air Lines. Prior to working for Delta, Wilson worked at both Kirkland & Ellis LLP and O’Melveny & Myers LLP, where she specialized in competition law.

Wilson has long advocated for the presence of more women in the antitrust field, and co-founded The Grapevine, a D.C.-based networking platform to encourage women to work in competition law roles.

After leaving the FTC, she joined Freshfields Bruckhaus Deringer as a senior advisor with the antitrust practice in February 2024.

== Political activity ==
Wilson has long been involved in Republican Party politics. Wilson donated $2,700 to Ted Cruz's presidential campaign in 2016 and $2,500 to Cruz's Senate campaign in 2011. During the 2008 presidential campaign, Wilson served on the antitrust committee that advised John McCain's presidential campaign.

== Federal Trade Commission ==
In 2018, President Donald Trump selected Wilson to serve as a member of the FTC, and she assumed office later that year. In a February 2023 piece in the Wall Street Journal, Wilson announced her resignation from the FTC, citing her opposition to chair Lina Khan's leadership of the agency and Khan's refusal to recuse from a FTC lawsuit to block Meta's acquisition of a virtual reality app maker.

While working as a staffer on the House Judiciary Committee, Khan helped author a report whose "findings and recommendations clearly show[ed] that it is long-past time for Congress to enact meaningful updates to our antitrust laws to address the lack of competition in digital markets and the monopoly power," of tech firms. Wilson's resignation became effective on March 31, 2023.

After her resignation, commentators reported that while at the FTC, Wilson voted to approve a $74-billion pharmaceutical merger between Bristol-Myers and Celgene. Wilson had represented Bristol-Myers while an antitrust partner at Kirkland & Ellis.
