= Robert Pitofsky =

Federal Trade Commission chair (1929–2018)

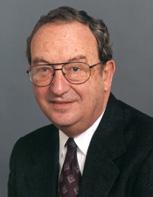

Chairman of the Federal Trade Commission
- In office April 11, 1995 – May 31, 2001
- President: Bill Clinton; George W. Bush
- Preceded by: Janet Dempsey Steiger
- Succeeded by: Timothy Muris

Commissioner of the Federal Trade Commission
- In office June 29, 1978 – April 30, 1981
- President: Jimmy Carter; Ronald Reagan
- Preceded by: Calvin J. Collier
- Succeeded by: George W. Douglas

Personal details
- Born: December 27, 1929 Paterson, New Jersey
- Died: October 6, 2018 (aged 88) Chevy Chase, Maryland
- Party: Democratic
- Education: New York University; Columbia Law School

Robert Pitofsky (December 27, 1929 – October 6, 2018) was an American lawyer and politician who was the chairman of the Federal Trade Commission of the United States from April 11, 1995, to May 31, 2001. He had previously been Dean of the Georgetown University Law Center from 1983 to 1989, and was Dean Emeritus at the time of his death.

== Early life and education ==
Born and raised in Paterson, New Jersey, Pitofsky attended Eastside High School. Pitofsky was educated at New York University and the Columbia University School of Law.

== Federal Trade Commission (FTC) ==
Before becoming chairman of the FTC on April 12, 1995, he previously held positions with the FTC as a Commissioner (1978–1981) and as Director of the Bureau of Consumer Protection (1970–1973). Pitofsky was the primary author of one of the most widely used casebooks in the area of trade regulation, now in its sixth edition.

== Personal life ==
Pitofsky was married and has three children and seven grandchildren. He died at the age of 88 on October 6, 2018.

== Publications ==
Books:

- Cases and Materials on Trade Regulation (Foundation Press 5th ed. 2003) (with others).
- "How the Chicago School Overshot the Mark" (Oxford Univ. Press 2008) (Pitofsky, ed.).

Articles:

- "Antitrust at the Turn of the Twenty-first Century: the Matter of Remedies," 91 Geo. L.J. 169 (2002).
- "Antitrust and Intellectual Property: Unresolved Issues at the Heart of the New Economy," 34 Intell. Prop. L. Rev. 643 (2002), reprinting 16 Berkeley Tech L.J. 535 (2001).
- "The Essential Facilities Doctrine Under United States Antitrust Law," 70 Antitrust L.J. 443 (2002) (with others).
- "Challenges of the New Economy: Issues at the Intersection of Antitrust and Intellectual Property". Antitrust Law Journal. 68: 913. 2001.
- "The Political Content of Antitrust," 127 U. Penn. L. Rev. 1050 (1979).
- "Beyond Nader: Consumer Protection and the Regulation of Advertising," 90 Harv. L. Rev. 661 (1977).

== See also ==
- List of former FTC commissioners
