= Center on Privacy and Technology =

Think tank at Georgetown University

- Formation: 2014
- Founder: Alvaro Bedoya
- Type: Policy think tank
- Location: Washington, D.C.
- Director: Emily Tucker
- Parent organization: Georgetown University Law Center
- Website: www.law.georgetown.edu/privacy-technology-center/

The Georgetown Center on Privacy and Technology is a think tank at Georgetown University in Washington, DC dedicated to the study of privacy and technology. Established in 2014, it is housed within the Georgetown University Law Center. The goal of the Center is to conduct research and empower legal and legislative advocacy around issues of privacy and surveillance, with a focus on how such issues affect groups of different social class and race. In May 2022, the Center's founding director Alvaro Bedoya was confirmed as a commissioner of the United States Federal Trade Commission.

== Activities ==
=== Surveillance ===
The Center hosts an annual conference titled "The Color of Surveillance" which explored how government and technological surveillance affected different marginalized populations, including Black Americans, immigrants to the United States, religious minorities, and poor and working people.

In May 2022, the Center on Privacy and Technology published American Dragnet: Data-Driven Deportation in the 21st Century, a report detailing how U.S. Immigration and Customs Enforcement (ICE) has built a far-reaching surveillance system by accessing driver’s license databases, utility records, and purchasing data from commercial brokers, often without judicial oversight. The report found that ICE's surveillance practices affect the majority of adults in the United States. The findings of American Dragnet prompted significant congressional attention. In a House Judiciary Committee hearing titled Digital Dragnets: Examining the Government's Access to Your Personal Data, Representative Zoe Lofgren submitted the American Dragnet report into the hearing record. In September 2022, U.S. Senators Edward Markey and Ron Wyden sent a letter to the Department of Homeland Security urging the agency to cease its use of invasive surveillance technologies, including facial recognition and the purchase of commercial data. The Senators described ICE’s surveillance network as "Orwellian" and raised concerns about its broad civil rights implications.

=== Facial recognition ===
The Center has collaborated with many advocacy organizations, including the ACLU, the Algorithmic Justice League, and the Electronic Frontier Foundation, as part of campaigns raising awareness about the use of facial recognition by the government. In 2016, the Center published a report called The Perpetual Line-Up: Unregulated Police Face Recognition in America which documents the widespread unregulated use of facial recognition by law enforcement across the United States. In 2018, a Freedom of Information Act lawsuit brought by the Center against the New York Police Department revealed that facial recognition scans were being run on mugshots of every arrestee. A subsequent report in 2019, "Garbage In, Garbage Out: Face Recognition on Flawed Data" documented multiple cases of police departments attempting to identify suspects using hand-drawn sketches, highly edited photos, and photos of celebrity lookalikes.
