= Janet Dempsey Steiger =

American politician

Commissioner of the Federal Trade Commission
- In office August 11, 1989 – September 28, 1997
- President: George H.W Bush; Bill Clinton

Personal details
- Born: Janet Dempsey; June 10, 1939 Oshkosh, Wisconsin
- Died: April 3, 2004 (aged 64) Fort Myers, Florida

Janet Steiger (June 10, 1939, in Oshkosh, Wisconsin – April 3, 2004, in Fort Myers, Florida) was an American politician.

== Biography ==
Steiger graduated from Lawrence University in Appleton, Wisconsin. On August 10, 1963, she married William A. Steiger, who was elected to the United States House of Representatives. They had one son, William R. Steiger, who was the subject of controversy for his role in the politicization of science during the George W. Bush administration.

A member of the Republican Party, she was chairman of the Postal Rate Commission from 1981 to 1989 and chairperson of the Federal Trade Commission from August 11, 1989, to April 11, 1995. She was the first woman to serve as FTC Chair.

== See also ==
- List of former FTC commissioners
