= Stephen A. Nye =

American lawyer (1936-1979)

Commissioner of the Federal Trade Commission
- In office 1974–1976
- Nominated by: Gerald Ford

Personal details
- Born: July 11, 1936 Phoenix, Oregon, U.S.
- Died: May 23, 1979 (aged 42)
- Party: Republican
- Education: Stanford University (BS); Harvard Law School (JD)
- Occupation: Lawyer

Stephen A. Nye (1936–1979) was an American business lawyer. He served as Federal Trade Commissioner between 1974 and 1976. After leaving the FTC, he went back into private practise.
