= Joseph Simons =

American attorney

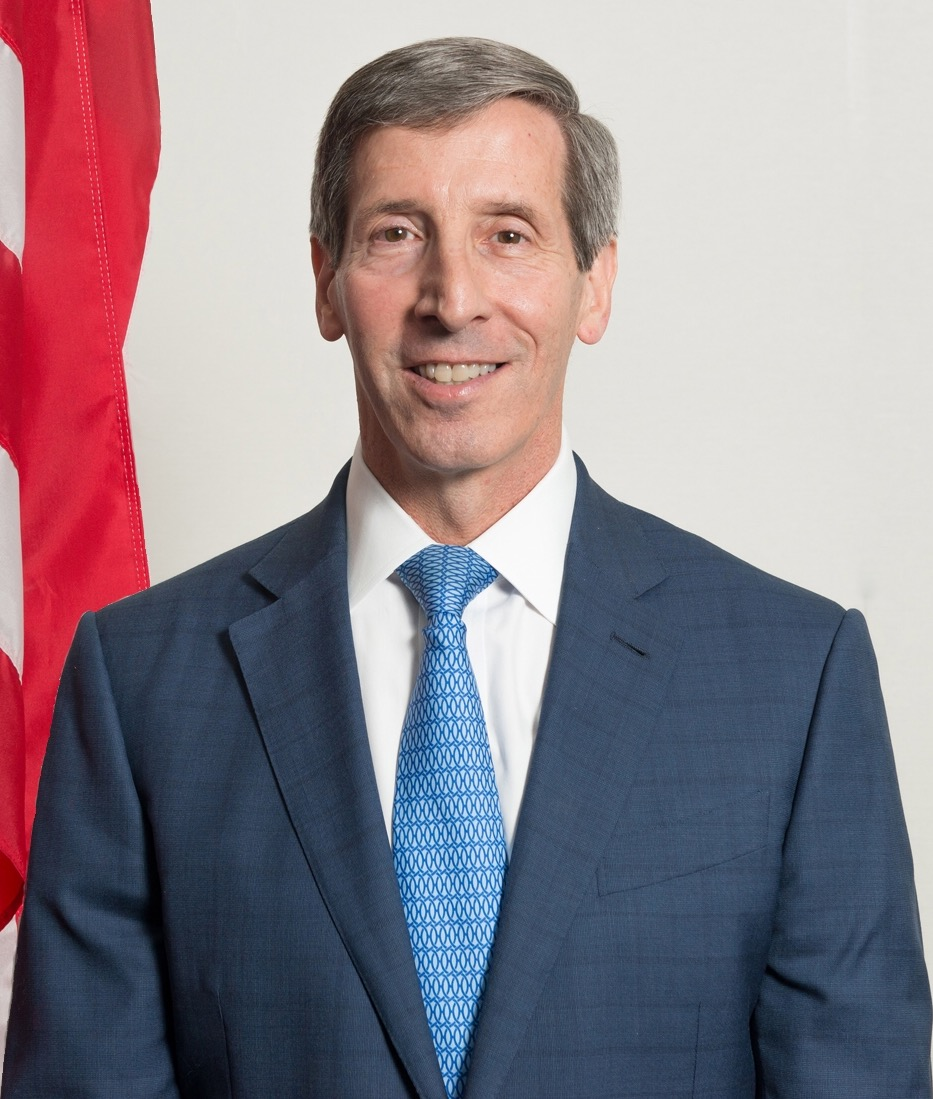
- Simons in 2018

55th Chair of the Federal Trade Commission
- In office May 1, 2018 – January 21, 2021
- President: Donald Trump; Joe Biden
- Preceded by: Maureen Ohlhausen (acting)
- Succeeded by: Rebecca Slaughter (acting)

Commissioner of the Federal Trade Commission
- In office May 1, 2018 – January 29, 2021
- President: Donald Trump; Joe Biden
- Preceded by: Terrell McSweeny
- Succeeded by: Lina Khan

Personal details
- Party: Republican
- Education: Cornell University (BA); Georgetown University (JD)

Joseph Simons is an American attorney who served as the 55th chairman of the Federal Trade Commission (FTC) from 2018 to 2021. He is a member of the Republican Party.

== Education ==
Simons received a Bachelor of Arts in economics and history from Cornell University in 1980 and his Juris Doctor cum laude from Georgetown University Law Center in 1983.

== Federal Trade Commission (FTC) ==
Simons was chief of the Federal Trade Commission's competition bureau from 2001 to 2003. He was a partner at Paul, Weiss, Rifkind, Wharton & Garrison LLP. Simons is also a co-developer of “Critical Loss Analysis,” a technique for market definition that has been incorporated into the Department of Justice and FTC Merger Guidelines, as well as applied in numerous court decisions.

On October 19, 2017, the White House announced that President Donald Trump would nominate Simons to be chairman of the Federal Trade Commission. He took office on May 1, 2018, and was scheduled to depart on January 29, 2021; he was replaced as chair on January 21.

Notably, the FTC under Simons filed an antitrust lawsuit against Facebook in December 2020.
