= Deborah Platt Majoras =

American businessperson

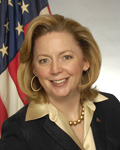

Chair of the Federal Trade Commission
- In office August 16, 2004 – March 29, 2008
- President: George W. Bush
- Preceded by: Timothy Muris
- Succeeded by: William Kovacic

Personal details
- Born: Titusville, Pennsylvania
- Party: Republican
- Education: Westminster College (BA); University of Virginia (JD)

Deborah Platt Majoras is the former chair of the Federal Trade Commission, appointed May 11, 2004, by President George W. Bush and sworn in on August 16, 2004. President Bush had announced his intention to appoint her to the position on July 30, 2004. Majoras is a member of the Republican Party.

Majoras filled the FTC vacancy created by Timothy Muris, who announced May 11, 2004 that he would step down to become a law professor at George Mason University. Majoras was replaced by William Kovacic in March 2008. In early 2008, she announced that she was leaving the FTC to become senior vice president and general counsel for Procter & Gamble, the largest consumer products company in the United States.

== Early life and education ==
Majoras was born in Titusville, Pennsylvania. She graduated from Westminster College in 1985 with a Bachelor of Arts, summa cum laude. She then attended the University of Virginia School of Law, where she was an editor of the Virginia Law Review. She graduated in 1989 with Order of the Coif honors.

== Career ==
She joined the Justice Department in 2001, as Deputy Assistant Attorney General at the Department of Justice's Antitrust Division. In her tenure, she oversaw matters involving numerous industries including software, financial networks, defense, health care, media and entertainment, banking and industrial equipment. Previously, she was a partner in the antitrust division at Jones Day.

=== Federal Trade Commission ===
Majoras was appointed as chair of the U.S. Federal Trade Commission by President George W. Bush in 2004. Majoras' tenure as FTC Chairperson was marked by the commission's strong efforts to protect and enhance consumer welfare. She focused on ensuring data security and protecting consumers from emerging frauds, such as identity theft, spyware and deceptive spam.

In May 2006, she was appointed by President George W. Bush to be co-chair of the Identity Theft Task Force. Majoras focused on increasing the efficiency and transparency of the merger review process, implementing sound antitrust policy regarding intellectual property, increasing efforts to prevent anticompetitive government policies and strengthening cooperation with consumer and competition agencies around the world.

In 2007, consumer groups urged Majoras to recuse herself from the FTC's probe of Google's DoubleClick. The groups noted that her husband, John Majoras, worked as an antitrust lawyer for Jones Day, which represented DoubleClick; the complaint noted that Deborah Majoras was previously employed at Jones Day. In response, the FTC's spokesperson stated they were reviewing the petition for recusal with the agency's chief ethics officer. On December 17, the FTC rebuffed the recusal, with Majoras stating that she did not have a conflict of interest as her husband no longer owned equity in the firm.

== Post-government career ==
She left the FTC in 2008 to join Procter & Gamble as senior vice president and general counsel. Since 2010 she has been chief legal officer and secretary of P&G. She retired from Procter & Gamble in 2022.

Majoras is a member of the American Bar Association's Section of Antitrust Law. She also served as a non-governmental advisor to the International Competition Network (ICN) and was named by President Bush to serve on the Antitrust Modernization Commission. She is a frequent speaker on competition and consumer protection policy issues to national and international audiences.

== Personal life ==
Majoras is married to John Majoras, co-chair of the litigation practice at law firm Jones Day.

== See also ==
- List of former FTC commissioners
