= Timothy Muris =

American lawyer and former FTC chair (born 1949)

Timothy J. Muris
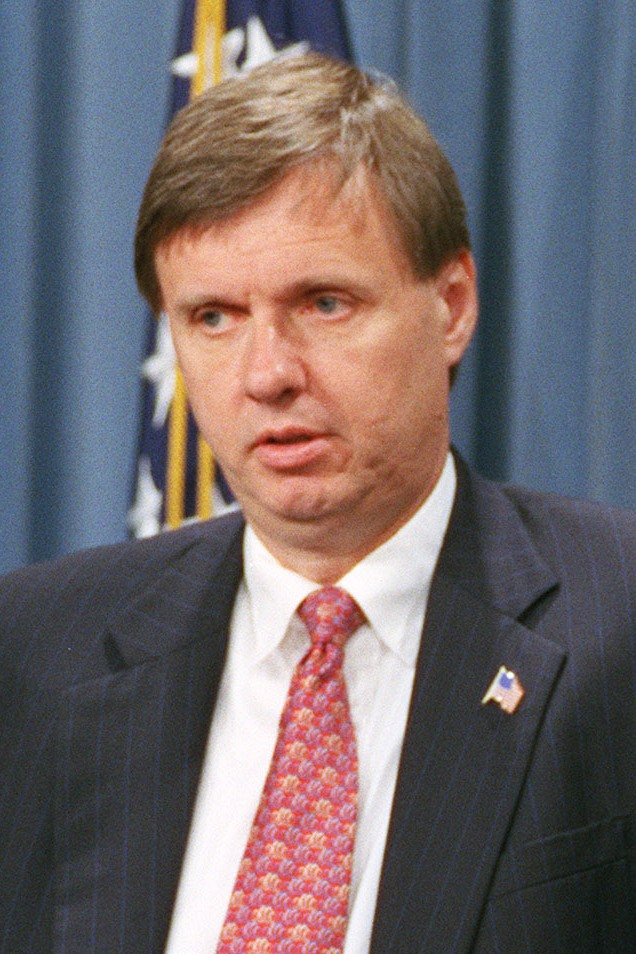
- Muris in 2002 as chairman of the Federal Trade Commission

Chair of the Federal Trade Commission
- In office June 4, 2001 – August 15, 2004
- President: George W. Bush
- Preceded by: Robert Pitofsky
- Succeeded by: Deborah Platt Majoras

Personal details
- Born: November 18, 1949 (age 76) Massillon, Ohio, U.S.
- Spouse: Pamela Harmon
- Children: 3
- Education: San Diego State University (BA); University of California, Los Angeles (JD)
- Occupation: Lawyer; law professor; government official

Timothy Joseph Muris (born November 18, 1949, in Massillon, Ohio) is an American lawyer, law professor, and former government official who served as chairman of the Federal Trade Commission (FTC) from 2001 to 2004. He is a George Mason University Foundation Professor of Law at George Mason University's Antonin Scalia Law School and senior counsel at Sidley Austin. His work has focused on antitrust law, consumer protection, privacy regulation, and regulatory policy.

== Education and early career ==
Muris graduated from Chula Vista High School in Chula Vista, California. He graduated with high honors from San Diego State University in 1971 and received his J.D. from the University of California, Los Angeles, School of Law in 1974. At UCLA, he was awarded membership in the Order of the Coif and served as an associate editor of the UCLA Law Review.

After law school, Muris joined the Federal Trade Commission as assistant to the director of the Office of Policy Planning and Evaluation, serving from 1974 to 1976. He then held academic positions at the University of Miami School of Law and was a Law and Economics Fellow at the University of Chicago Law School. In 1981, he served as Deputy Counsel to the Presidential Task Force on Regulatory Relief, which was headed by then-Vice President George H. W. Bush.

Muris returned to the FTC as Director of the Bureau of Consumer Protection from 1981 to 1983 and Director of the Bureau of Competition from 1983 to 1985. After leaving the FTC in 1985, he served in the Executive Office of the President at the Office of Management and Budget for three years, including as Executive Associate Director from 1985 to 1988.

== Academic and private practice career ==
Muris joined George Mason University's School of Law as a Foundation Professor in 1988 and served as interim dean of the law school from 1996 to 1997. His academic work has addressed antitrust law, consumer protection, regulatory policy, and budget issues.

During the 1990s and early 2000s, Muris was also of counsel at Collier, Shannon, Rill & Scott and at Howrey, Simon, Arnold & White. After his FTC chairmanship, he was of counsel at O'Melveny & Myers from 2004 to 2011 and at Kirkland & Ellis from 2011 to 2017. He became senior counsel at Sidley Austin, where his work has focused on antitrust enforcement, mergers, civil investigations, strategic counseling, and consumer protection issues including advertising and privacy regulation.

== FTC tenure ==
In 2001, President George W. Bush named Muris chairman of the Federal Trade Commission. He was confirmed by the United States Senate on May 25, 2001, sworn in on June 4, 2001, and served until August 15, 2004. He was succeeded as chairman by Deborah Platt Majoras, who was sworn in on August 16, 2004.

=== National Do Not Call Registry ===
During Muris's chairmanship, the FTC opened the National Do Not Call Registry for consumer registrations on June 27, 2003. The registry allowed consumers to register phone numbers in order to limit unwanted commercial telemarketing calls. The registry faced legal challenges after its launch, and in February 2004 the United States Court of Appeals for the Tenth Circuit upheld its constitutionality. By June 2004, consumers had registered 62 million phone numbers. Former FTC Commissioner Thomas B. Leary later described the Do Not Call Rule as the most noteworthy consumer-protection achievement of Muris's tenure.

=== Consumer protection and privacy agenda ===
In October 2001, Muris announced an FTC privacy agenda that called for increasing agency resources devoted to privacy protection by 50 percent. The agenda emphasized enforcement and consumer education, and included initiatives involving deceptive spam, identity theft, credit reporting accuracy, children's online privacy, enforcement of privacy promises, and the Gramm–Leach–Bliley Act. The Associated Press reported that Muris emphasized stronger enforcement of existing consumer privacy laws rather than seeking broad new Internet privacy legislation.

In 2004, after Congress directed the FTC to study a possible National Do Not Email Registry under the CAN-SPAM Act of 2003, the Commission reported that such a registry would fail to reduce spam without email-authentication systems and might increase spam by creating security and privacy risks.

=== Antitrust policy ===
During Muris's chairmanship, the FTC placed renewed emphasis on antitrust issues involving intellectual property, competition in the health care sector, and administrative litigation. Muris also argued for greater reliance on markets and less use of government regulation in sectors of the economy. Former FTC Commissioner Thomas B. Leary later wrote that Muris did not reverse the policies of his predecessor, Robert Pitofsky, but moved the Commission in "some new directions". Leary also credited Muris with expanding the agency's use of hearings and workshops on issues ranging from patent and antitrust matters to Internet privacy.

== Later advisory work ==
In 2005, Muris served on the President's Advisory Panel on Federal Tax Reform, a panel created by President George W. Bush to advise the Secretary of the Treasury on revenue-neutral options for reforming the federal tax code.

== Selected publications ==
- Muris, Timothy J. (2005). "Principles for a Successful Competition Agency". University of Chicago Law Review. 72 (1): 165–187.
- Muris, Timothy J. (2003). "Improving the Economic Foundations of Competition Policy". George Mason Law Review. 12: 1.
- Muris, Timothy J. (2003). "Looking Forward: The Federal Trade Commission and the Future Development of U.S. Competition Policy". Columbia Business Law Review. 2003 (2): 359.

== See also ==
- List of former FTC commissioners
