= Lewis A. Engman =

Federal Trade Commission (1973) to (1975)

Lewis August Engman
- Born: January 6, 1936; Grand Rapids, Michigan
- Died: July 12, 1995 (aged 59); Georgetown University Hospital
- Occupation: Lawyer

Lewis A. Engman was an American lawyer, who served as the chairman of the Federal Trade Commission from 21 February 1973 to 31 December 1975. He is also credited with being instrumental in passing legislation keeping in consistency with the interests of both Research-based and generic drug companies.

== Early life ==
Engman was born in Grand Rapids, Michigan, on January 6, 1936. He graduated from the University of Michigan in 1957 with high distinction, where he was a member of Phi Beta Kappa. He completed his post-graduation studies at University College in London and the London School of Economics from 1957 to 1958. Subsequently, he received a law degree from Harvard Law School in 1961.

== Career ==
During the 1960s, he practised law in Grand Rapids. In 1970, he came to Washington to serve as legislative counsel and general counsel to the president's special assistant for consumer affairs. In 1971, he became assistant director of the White House domestic council. From 1973 to 1975, he worked as the chairman of FTC.In 1979, he was elected chairman of the Pharmaceutical Manufacturers Association. Engman, advocate of deregulation. He formulated some provisions of the Drug Price Competition Act of 1984, which increased the competitiveness of generic drugs as well as restored patent guarantees for developing new medicines. He served the post until 1984. From 1984 to 1993, He practiced regulatory and antitrust law at the Washington Office of the Winston and Strawn law firm.

For 25 years, he worked on issues like healthcare, regulation, competition and international economic policy. He served on the Council of administrative conference of the United States and Council of the International Federation of Pharmaceutical manufacturers.

He served as the chairman of the Blue Ribbon Committee on Generic Medicines, an independent panel which studied generic medicines and the Food and Drug Administration in 1990s.

He was also a trustee of the National Foundation for Advancement in arts.

== Personal life and death ==
Engman was married to Patricia Hanahan. Together they had three sons.

He died of stroke on July 12, 1995, in Georgetown University Hospital, at the age of 59.
