= Daniel Oliver (policymaker) =

American lawyer (1939–2026)

- Born: March 10, 1939; New York City, U.S.
- Died: June 26, 2026 (aged 87); Mattapoisett, Massachusetts, U.S.
- Occupations: Lawyer, writer, editor

Daniel Oliver (March 10, 1939 – June 26, 2026) was an American executive editor of National Review from 1973 to 1976 and chairman of the Federal Trade Commission from 1986 to 1990. He was chairman of the National Review board and a trustee of the magazine made so by William F. Buckley, Jr., founder of the publication.

== Background ==
Oliver grew up in New York City. His ancestors included Samuel Seabury, the first American Episcopal bishop, Peter Oliver, colonial Chief Justice of Massachusetts, Andrew Oliver, lieutenant governor of the Province of Massachusetts Bay, and the inventor Francis Blake.

He graduated from Harvard College in 1964, where he studied with Bernard Bailyn, and then from Fordham University School of Law.

== Early career ==
From 1959 to 1962, Oliver served in the U.S. Army, where he was stationed in California and Germany.

In 1965, he was a candidate for New York's state assembly while campaigning with William F. Buckley, Jr., in support of Buckley's New York City mayoral race.

In 1970, he worked as the director of research for James L. Buckley's successful New York senatorial race.

== Reagan administration ==
Oliver was the general counsel at the U.S. Department of Education from 1981 to 1983 under President Ronald Reagan. He was general counsel at the U.S. Department of Agriculture from 1983 to 1986 before becoming the chairman of the Federal Trade Commission, a position he held until 1990. He has an honorary doctoral degree from the Universidad Francisco Marroquin, an honor also bestowed upon former U.S. Ambassador Jeane Kirkpatrick and former Czech President Vaclav Klaus.

The Oliver-run Federal Trade Commission was known as one of the most anti-cartelist in the nation's history.

=== Milk Cartel Battle ===
One of Oliver's more famous battles took place from 1986 to 1987 when he led the fight to deregulate the price of milk in New York.

Oliver awarded a “National Consumer Fleece Award” to New York State Agriculture Commissioner Joseph Gerace for his support of the New York Milk Cartel, which prevented a New Jersey dairy from selling milk in parts of New York City. After Oliver, on the steps of City Hall at Christmas time, said Gerace had "brazenly upheld one of the most anti-consumer monopolies in the country", Oliver wished the Commissioner a "Fleece Navidad". The quip garnered Oliver headlines nationwide, and shortly afterwards the state's support for the dairy cartel collapsed, and Gerace resigned under pressure from the Cuomo administration.

=== Health Insurance Cartel Battle ===
Oliver tried to repeal the insurance anti-trust exemption in health insurance markets in 1987, provoking a long and costly battle that he ultimately lost. Oliver's goal was to reduce the costs of American health insurance by removing barriers limiting competition—in this case, being the first FTC chairman to propose the destruction of the McCarran-Ferguson Act. However, the issue has again received national attention in the 2016 presidential election.

=== Airline competition ===
Oliver defended airline deregulation in the 1980s and said it had allowed for more companies to enter the market and lower overall prices—saving Americans $100 billion.

=== "The Oliver Effect" ===
Oliver's tenure at the FTC led some analysts to saying he sought to implement "The Oliver Effect" in product markets. In this way, Oliver also argued against foreign trade restrictions, saying in 1986 that they cost Americans $50 billion a year.

== Post-Reagan administration ==
Oliver was chairman Emeritus of the Pacific Research Institute, and chairman of the board of Education and Research Institute, an organization founded in 1974 by the late M. Stanton Evans, one of the founders of the modern conservative movement in America.

He also wrote a column as "The Candid American," which appeared in a variety of publications including The Federalist, The Daily Caller, Ricochet, The American Conservative, and The Washington Times.

Oliver was also Senior Director of the Washington, D.C.–based White House Writers Group, a public policy and corporate consultancy. He focussed particularly on anti-trust.

Previously, he served as president of the conservative Philadelphia Society, and was a senior fellow at The Heritage Foundation, and chairman of the San Francisco–based Pacific Research Institute for Public Policy.

== Personal life and death ==
Oliver was fluent in Russian and was a U.S. Army-trained linguist. He was married to Louise V. Oliver, U.S. ambassador to UNESCO in Paris from 2004 to 2009.

He was a member of the Episcopal Church.

Oliver died in Mattapoisett, Massachusetts, on June 26, 2026, at the age of 87.

== See also ==
- National Review
- Federal Trade Commission
- William F. Buckley, Jr.
