= Miles Kirkpatrick =

American lawyer

Miles W. Kirkpatrick (c. 1919 – May 2, 1998) was an American lawyer, who served as the chairman of the Federal Trade Commission from September 15, 1970 to February 20, 1973. Kirkpatrick is credited with the re-organisation and dramatic improvements in the functioning of FTC.

== Early life ==
Kirkpatrick is a native of Easton, Pennsylvania. He graduated from Princeton University and University of Pennsylvania Law School. While studying in Princeton, he majored in philosophy. Later, he participated in the United States Army Air Corps in World War II, but was discharged for medical reasons in 1944.

== Career ==
Kirkpatrick became a partner in the Philadelphia law firm Morgan, Lewis & Brockius in 1955 and gained prominence as an antitrust specialist. He headed the antitrust section of America's bar association from 1968 to 1969. In 1969, at the request of president Richard Nixon, he led a bar association commission to look into the FTC. The commission concluded that many high-level employees were do-nothings and incompetent, while FTC was pursuing interest in trivial matters.

Nixon was impressed by Kirkpatrick and appointed Caspar Weinberger as the chairman of FTC. In 1970, Nixon appointed Miles as the chairman of FTC, while his predecessor Kirkpatrick was appointed the head of office management and budget.

Under Kirkpatrick, the commission prodded manufacturers to back up their claims of advertised safety, performance and therapeutic value. It told Coca-Cola to stop contending that one of their drinks was abundant in vitamin C. The commission also instructed the anti-freeze Zerex to warn that it could damage automative cooling systems.

He resigned early in 1973 to pursue a legal career. It was presumed that Nixon nudged him out of office, although his son confirmed that it was voluntary, as Kirkpatrick thought "he had accomplished all he could."

Kirkpatrick retired from his law firm in 1985. After retirement, he was active in community affairs and was a board of members of Solesbury School.

== Personal life, death, and legacy ==
Miles was married to Anne Skerrett for 53 years. Together they had one son, two daughters and eight grandchildren.

Kirkpatrick died at his home in Strafford, Pennsylvania on May 2, 1998 at the age of 79. Following his death, the FTC established the Miles W. Kirkpatrick Award, awarded to individuals who have made "lasting and significant contributions to the FTC".
