= Terry Calvani =

American lawyer and professor (born 1947)

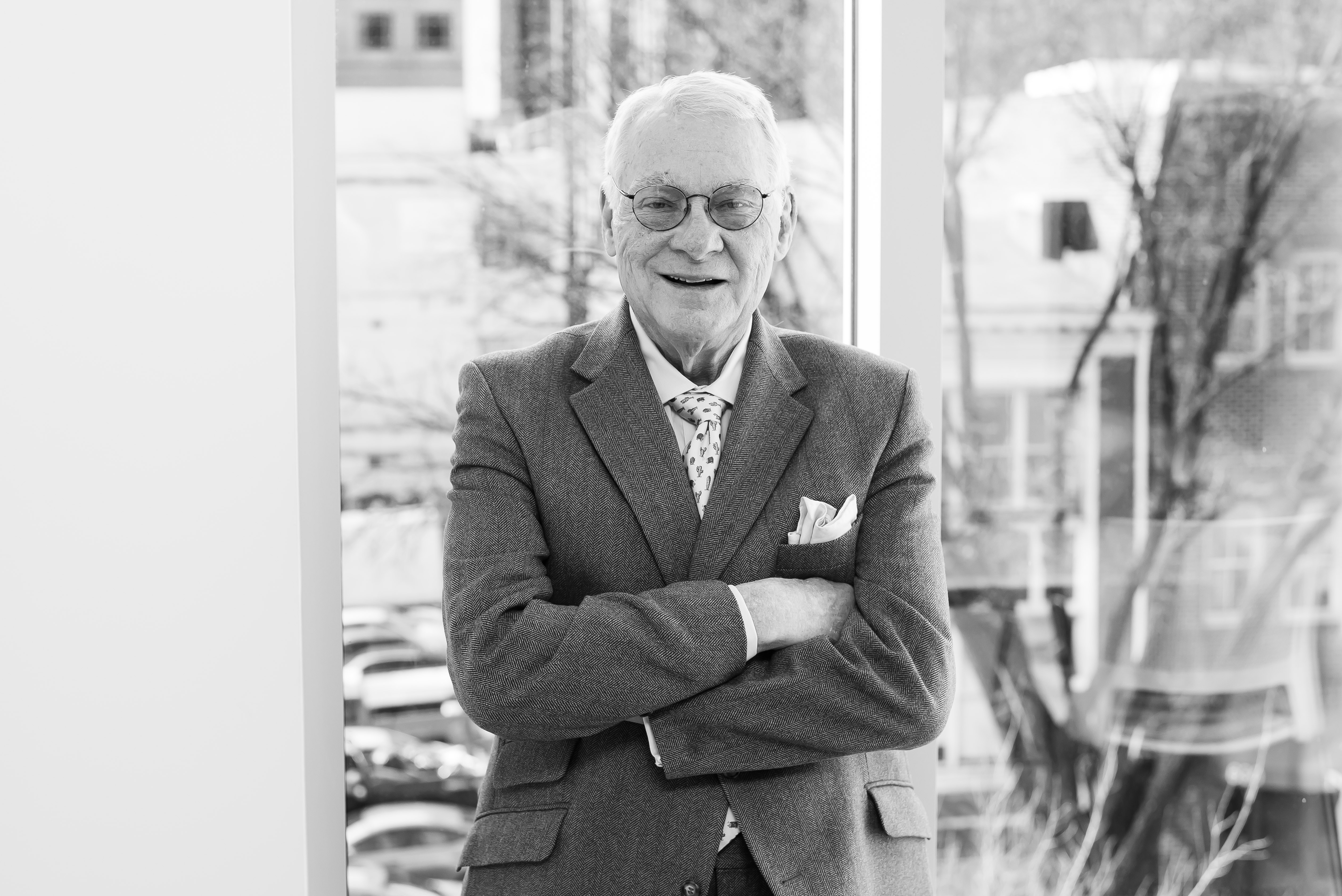

Member of the Irish Competition Authority
- In office 2002–2005
- Taoiseach: Bertie Ahern
- Succeeded by: Stanley Wong

Commissioner of the Federal Trade Commission
- In office November 18, 1983 – September 25, 1990
- President: Ronald Reagan; George H. W. Bush
- Preceded by: David Clanton
- Succeeded by: Roscoe B. Starek III

Personal details
- Born: January 29, 1947 (age 79) Carlsbad, New Mexico, U.S.
- Spouse: Sarah Sage Holter
- Education: University of New Mexico (B.A.); Cornell Law School (J.D.)

Terry Calvani (born January 29, 1947) is an American lawyer, former government official and university professor. Appointed by President Ronald Reagan, he served one term as Commissioner of the U.S. Federal Trade Commission. He was also a Member (now "Commissioner") of the governing board of the Competition Authority of Ireland (now Competition and Consumer Protection Commission ), where he held the criminal investigations portfolio. He has taught antitrust law at Vanderbilt University School of Law, Duke University School of Law, the Harvard Law School, Trinity College Dublin, Cornell Law School, Columbia Law School and University of California, Hastings College of Law. He retired from the practice of antitrust law with Freshfields Bruckhaus Deringer in April 2019. He served as a senior advisor to Brunswick Group LLC from March 2020 through February 2025.

== Professional life ==
After graduating from law school, Calvani practiced with the San Francisco firm of Pillsbury Madison & Sutro. From 1974 to 1983, Calvani was professor of law at Vanderbilt University School of Law, where he taught courses in antitrust law. In 1983, he was appointed by President Ronald Reagan to serve one term as commissioner of the U.S. Federal Trade Commission from 1983-1990. He returned to practicing law at Pillsbury Madison & Sutro from 1990 until 2002, during which time he also taught antitrust at the Harvard Law School, from 1998 to 2001 and also at Duke University School of Law, in 2000.

From 2002 until 2005, he was a member of the governing board of the Competition Authority of Ireland, where he held the criminal investigations and merger review portfolios. During his tenure at the Irish commission, he served on numerous Advisory Committees to the Directorate General for Competition of the European Commission. Concurrently, he taught antitrust law at Trinity College Dublin, from 2004 to 2005.

Calvani practiced antitrust law with Freshfields Bruckhaus Deringer, resident in its Washington, D.C., office from 2005 until his retirement in April 2019. During this period he also taught antitrust law at Cornell Law School in 2006 and 2016, Columbia Law School in 2017, and the University of California, Hastings College of Law in 2019.

Calvani is the co-editor of a book on antitrust economics and the author of numerous articles on antitrust law. He has lectured extensively on competition issues and has served as chairman of several American Bar Association antitrust committees and on the governing board of its Antitrust Section. He is a life member of the American Law Institute, the Judicial Conference for the Sixth Circuit Court of Appeals and serves on the advisory boards of the Antitrust Bulletin and Oxford Journal of Antitrust Enforcement, and has been a member of the Administrative Conference of the United States. Calvani has served as a Non-Governmental Advisor (NGA)for the United States Department of Justice Antitrust Division and the United States Federal Trade Commission to the International Competition Network (ICN) from 2005 to 2021, and has provided technical assistance to competition enforcement agencies in Africa, Asia and Latin America.

From March 2020 through February 2025 he served as a senior advisor to Brunswick Group LLC.

== Personal life ==
Calvani was born and grew up in Carlsbad, New Mexico. He received a B.A. in history from the University of New Mexico in 1970 and a J.D. with distinction from the Cornell Law School in 1972. He is married to Sarah Sage Holter, and lives in Nashville, Tennessee. He was previously married to Mary Virginia Anderson of Mill Valley, California and Judith Tbompson of Birmingham, Alabama. He has two children, Dominic Mario Calvani and Torello Howard Calvani, two step-children, Benjamin Douglas Hill and Elizabeth Sage Hill, and seven grandchildren.

== See also ==
- List of former FTC commissioners
