= Antitrust Law Journal =

ABA journal on antitrust topics

- Discipline: Antitrust law
- Language: English

Publication details
- Publisher: American Bar Association (Chicago, Illinois, U.S.)
- Frequency: Triannually

Standard abbreviations
- Bluebook: Antitrust L.J.
- ISO 4: Antitrust Law J.

Indexing
- ISSN: 0003-6056
- LCCN: 90643040
- OCLC no.: 803599253

Links
- Journal homepage; Online archive

The Antitrust Law Journal is a triannual peer-reviewed academic journal published by the Antitrust Law Section of the American Bar Association (ABA). Often cited as one of the key secondary sources in the field of competition law, the journal also features articles on data privacy and consumer protection law.

In late 1952, the ABA launched a new publication titled Section of Antitrust Law. In August 1966, the publication was renamed the Antitrust Law Journal.

Besides its articles and essays, the journal regularly prints the proceedings from the Spring and Annual Meetings of the Antitrust Law Section.

As of 2025, the journal's executive editor was J. Robert Robertson.
