= Paul Rand Dixon =

American attorney and decorated World War II veteran

Commissioner of the Federal Trade Commission
- In office March 21, 1961 – September 25, 1981
- President: John F. Kennedy; Lyndon B. Johnson; Richard Nixon; Gerald Ford; Jimmy Carter; Ronald Reagan

Personal details
- Born: September 29, 1913 Nashville, Tennessee, United States
- Died: May 2, 1996 (aged 82)
- Party: Democratic
- Education: Vanderbilt University (B.A.); University of Florida (J.D.)
- Occupation: Attorney

Paul Rand Dixon (September 29, 1913 – May 2, 1996) was an American attorney and decorated World War II veteran. Dixon was a member of the Federal Trade Commission (FTC), serving on the body from 1961 to 1981. Additionally, he served as the agency's chair from 1961 to 1969 and again briefly in 1976.

== Early life and education ==
Dixon was born September 29, 1913, in Nashville, Tennessee, to James and Sarah Dixon. He received his bachelor's degree from Vanderbilt University and his Juris Doctor from the University of Florida.

== Career ==
Dixon was a member of the FTC's staff from 1930 to 1957, except for his three years of service in the U.S. Navy from 1942 to 1945. While in the Navy, Dixon would reach the rank of lieutenant commander. Between 1957 and 1961, Dixon served as counsel and staff director for the U.S. Senate Antitrust and Monopoly Subcommittee, where he worked with Senator Estes Kefauver (D-TN).

=== Tobacco regulation ===
As FTC Chair, Dixon notably led the successful fight in 1965 to mandate cigarette companies to include health warnings on their products. The push began following a report by the Surgeon General on the carcinogenic qualities of tobacco, which led Dixon himself to stop smoking.

=== Reputation ===
During his time as an FTC Commissioner, Dixon developed a reputation as a "colorful and often controversial member" with "almost legendary wit and candor". In 1978, he was praised at a reception for his longtime service to the agency by then-FTC Chair Michael Pertschuk, who said:

"Paul Band [sic] Dixon can follow a trial of greed and abuse of market power by instinct to its source, and his heart and vote are consistently with the consummer [sic]"

== Personal life ==
Dixon was a Methodist, and attended the Metropolitan Memorial United Methodist Church in Washington, D.C. Dixon died on May 2, 1996, at the age of 82, having outlived his wife, Doris Evelyn (née Busby). Dixon was survived by his two sons, Paul Jr. and David.

== Legacy ==
In 2014 a famous dictum of his, from a ruling in a multi-level marketing (MLM) pyramid scheme case, "an intolerable potential to deceive," was newly immortalized in the title of a book, Downline... an intolerable potential to deceive, by E. Robert Smith. The FTC has awarded the "Paul Rand Dixon Award" in his honor to individuals within the agency who have displayed strong character and commitment to antitrust enforcement.

== See also ==
- List of former FTC commissioners
