= Orson Swindle =

American politician (born 1937)

Orson G. Swindle III
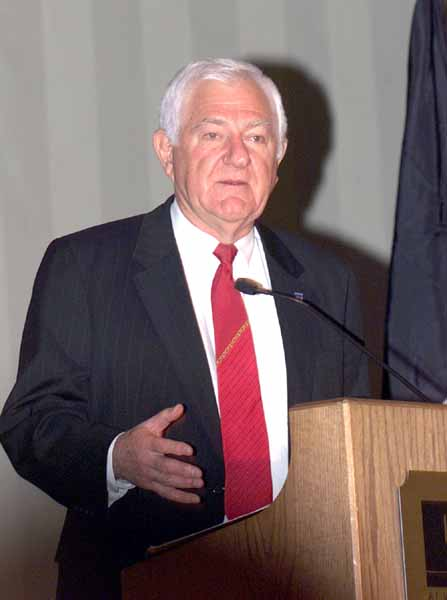

Commissioner of the Federal Trade Commission
- In office December 18, 1997 – June 30, 2005
- President: Bill Clinton; George W. Bush

Personal details
- Born: March 8, 1937 (age 89) Thomasville, Georgia, U.S.
- Party: Republican
- Spouse: Angie
- Education: Georgia Tech (BS); Florida State University (MBA)
- Occupation: Federal Trade Commission

Military service
- Allegiance: United States
- Branch/service: United States Marine Corps
- Years of service: 1959–1979
- Rank: Lieutenant Colonel
- Battles/wars: Vietnam War
- Awards: Silver Star (2); Legion of Merit (2); Bronze Star Medal (2); Purple Heart (2)

Orson G. Swindle III (born March 8, 1937) is a retired United States Marine Corps officer, a decorated Vietnam War prisoner of war, and a former Commissioner of the Federal Trade Commission of the United States, serving from December 18, 1997 to June 30, 2005. He had previously served as Assistant Secretary of Commerce during the Reagan Administration.

Swindle previously served as State Director for the U.S. Department of Agriculture. In 1994 and in 1996 he was a Republican candidate for Congress in Hawaii's 1st Congressional District. In 1996 he held the incumbent, Democrat Neil Abercrombie, to 50% of the vote. Swindle served over twenty years as a Naval Aviator in the Marine Corps, retiring as a lieutenant colonel.

== Education ==
Swindle received his bachelor's degree in Industrial Management from Georgia Tech in 1959 and a Master of Business Administration degree from Florida State University in 1975.

== Marine Corps career ==
After graduating from Georgia Tech, Swindle reported to Marine Corps Base Quantico for The Basic School. He then reported to NAS Pensacola, Florida for initial flight training followed by follow-on training at other naval air stations. After earning his wings in May 1964, he was stationed at MCAS Beaufort, South Carolina. On February 1, 1966, he deployed with VMF(AW)-235 ("The Death Angels") to DaNang Air Base and flew more than 200 sorties in the Vought F-8E Crusader during the Vietnam War.

On November 11, 1966, Captain Swindle's Crusader was shot down while on a mission over the Quảng Bình Province, North Vietnam. It was his last scheduled flight. Captured by the North Vietnamese near the city of Vinh Linh, Capt Swindle spent the next seven years being shuffled around various prison camps, including the notorious Hanoi Hilton complex. While in captivity, he shared a cell with future senator and presidential candidate, then-Lieutenant Commander (later Captain) John McCain.

Promoted to the rank of major while in captivity, Swindle was released on March 4, 1973. Restored to flying status, he then flew the A-4M Skyhawk II and TA-4F Skyhawk II at MCAS Cherry Point, North Carolina. He subsequently attended Florida State University under a Marine Corps-funded postgraduate program, earning a Master of Business Administration degree in 1975. He then returned to the Fleet Marine Force. His 20 military decorations for valor in combat include two Silver Stars, the Legion of Merit with Combat "V", two Bronze Star Medals with Combat "V", two Purple Hearts, two personal and eleven Strike/Flight awards of the Air Medal, the Navy Commendation Medal with Combat "V", the Combat Action Ribbon, the Prisoner of War Medal and numerous other unit, campaign and service awards. His non-combat decorations include a Gold Star in lieu of a second Legion of Merit and the Meritorious Service Medal.

Swindle retired from the Marine Corps in 1979 with the rank of lieutenant colonel.

== Politics and professional relationships ==
Swindle served as executive director of United We Stand America and spokesman for Ross Perot's 1992 presidential campaign.

From late 2005 until August 2009, Swindle served as a Senior Policy Advisor at the law firm of Hunton & Williams LLP in Washington, D.C. His specific charge was within the firm's Center for Information Policy Leadership, which was founded to "develop innovative, pragmatic approaches to privacy and information security issues from a business-process perspective while respecting the privacy interests of individuals." The center has approximately 40 corporate members including American Express, Eli Lilly, GE, Microsoft, IBM, Procter & Gamble, and Wal-Mart.

Swindle previously served on the board of Citizens Against Government Waste (CAGW), an independent political advocacy group that seeks to eliminate waste, mismanagement, and inefficiency in the federal government.

On September 2, 2008, he gave the opening speech on the second day of the Republican National Convention in Saint Paul, Minnesota, during which he introduced veterans and fellow prisoners of war in the crowd. He also introduced President George H. W. Bush, who ran against Swindle's candidate Perot in the 1992 presidential election.

== See also ==
- List of former FTC commissioners
