= Green industrial policy =

Strategic government policy

Green Industrial Policy
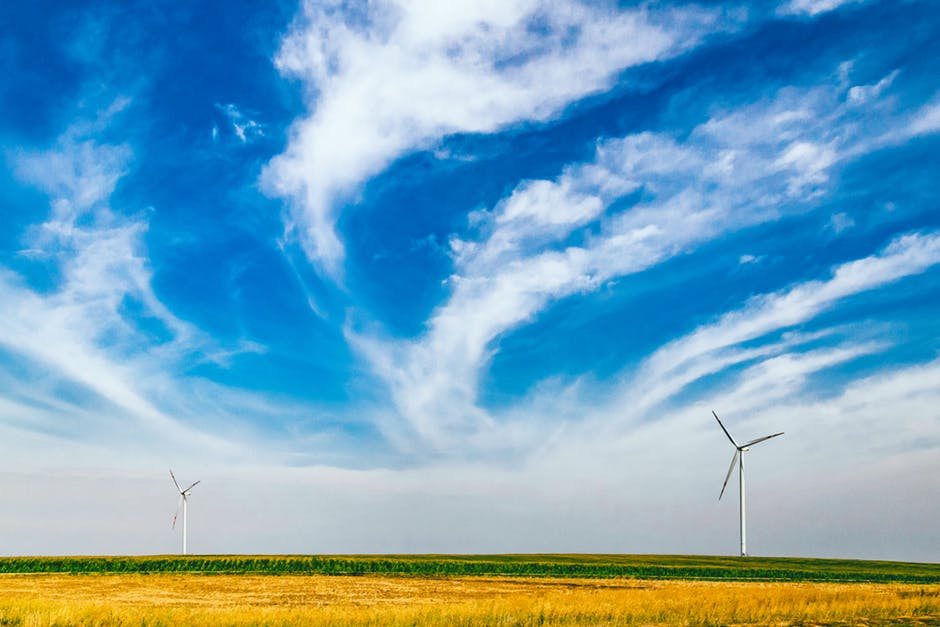
- Green industrial policy seeks to address market failures and protect the environment.

Green industrial policy (GIP) is strategic government policy that attempts to accelerate the development and growth of green industries to transition towards a low-carbon economy. Green industrial policy is necessary because green industries such as renewable energy and low-carbon public transportation infrastructure face high costs and many risks in terms of the market economy. Therefore, they need support from the public sector in the form of industrial policy until they become commercially viable. Natural scientists warn that immediate action must occur to lower greenhouse gas emissions and mitigate the effects of climate change. Social scientists argue that the mitigation of climate change requires state intervention and governance reform. Thus, governments use GIP to address the economic, political, and environmental issues of climate change. GIP is conducive to sustainable economic, institutional, and technological transformation. It goes beyond the free market economic structure to address market failures and commitment problems that hinder sustainable investment. Effective GIP builds political support for carbon regulation, which is necessary to transition towards a low-carbon economy. Several governments use different types of GIP that lead to various outcomes. The Green Industry plays a pivotal role in creating a sustainable and environmentally responsible future; By prioritizing resource efficiency, renewable energy, and eco-friendly practices, this industry significantly benefits society and the planet at large.

GIP and industrial policy are similar, although GIP has unique challenges and goals. GIP faces the particular challenge of reconciling economic and environmental issues. It deals with a high degree of uncertainty about green investment profitability. Furthermore, it addresses the reluctance of industry to invest in green development, and it helps current governments influence future climate policy.

GIP offers opportunities for energy transition to renewables and a low-carbon economy. A large challenge for climate policy is a lack of industry and public support, but GIP creates benefits that attract support for sustainability. It can create strategic niche management and generate a "green spiral," or a process of feedback that combines industrial interests with climate policy. GIP can protect employees in emerging and declining industries, which increases political support for other climate policy. While carbon pricing is efficient for abatement, it often fails to trigger radical innovation or systemic change on its own; GIP addresses these market failures by providing the "carrots" (subsidies, R&D) that make the "sticks" of carbon pricing more politically feasible. Carbon pricing, sustainable energy transitions, and decreases in greenhouse gas emissions have higher chances of success as political support increases. GID is closely associated with the green recovery, a set of policy directives to address the economic effects of COVID-19 and the environmental effects of climate change by encouraging renewable energy expansion and green job growth. However, GIP faces many risks. Some risks include poor government choices about which industries to support; political capture of economic policy; wasted resources; ineffective action to combat climate change; poor policy design that lacks policy objectives and exit strategies; trade disputes; and coordination failure. Strategic steps can be taken to manage the risks of GIP. Some include public and private sector communication, transparency, and accountability; policy with clear objectives, evaluation techniques, and exit strategies; policy learning and policy experimentation; green rent management; strong institutions; and a free press.

Governments in various countries, states, provinces, territories, and cities use different types of green industrial policy. Distinct policy instruments lead to several outcomes. Examples include sunrise and sunset policies, subsidies, research and development, local content requirements, feed-in tariffs, tax credits, export restrictions, consumer mandates, green public procurement rules, and renewable portfolio standards.

== Versus industrial policy ==
GIP and industrial policy (IP) have similarities. Both seek to promote the development of industries and the creation of new technology. Each approach also involves government intervention in the economy to address economic issues and market failures. Both use similar policy approaches, like research and development subsidies and tax credits. Further, they face comparable risks, such as implementation failure that occurs when the government fails to monitor the policy adequately. Additionally, the two are related because policymakers can use information from past IP when they design and implement GIP. Policymakers can apply policy learning and lesson drawing from the failures and successes of IP to GIP to lower its risks. For example, an important lesson from IP is that what works for one region will not necessarily work for another, so policymakers cannot directly adopt policy from a different region because it must address an area's local context to ensure success. Overall, the two approaches have many things in common.

However, GIP differs significantly from IP because it addresses environmental concerns, whereas IP does not. The current economy focuses on private benefits, such as immediate profitability, rather than social benefits, like reducing pollution. Since green investment has less private benefits than social benefits, GIP deals with the unique commitment problem that green investment profitability is highly uncertain, so firms are reluctant to invest. As a result, governments use GIP to promote green investments. Future environmental policy success, like carbon taxation policy, hinges on the future availability of renewable energy. Current investment is the only way to ensure future availability, and GIP addresses this fact. Efficient and accessible green technology will also make it politically easier to adopt future low-carbon policies. Thus, a transition towards a low-carbon economy depends on current investment, and as such, it depends on GIP.

== Energy transitions ==
The persistence of a carbon-based economy has led to environmentally destructive path dependency, and energy transitions are vital to divert from the reliance. Strategic niche management (SNM) offers an opportunity for energy transitions. New, sustainable technologies cannot immediately compete on the market with existing, unsustainable technologies due to path dependency. Green innovations that are not immediately profitable are vital for inducing sustainable development and achieving societal goals of mitigating climate change. Thus, governments must create technological niches and use forms of GIP to subsidize and nurture technological niches to ensure that green innovations develop. Technical niches provide protected space for innovative sustainable development that co-evolves with user practices, regulatory structures, and technology. Co-evolutionary dynamics are necessary for successful niche innovation -- multiple actors from multiple layers must work together for sustainable transitions. Social networks are essential for this niche development because numerous stakeholders lead to many points of view, more commitment and resources, and more innovation.

Sustainable urbanization models in cities are examples of SNM. In these instances, municipal governments and social networks help create small-scale testing spaces that allow for technological and social innovation, such as developing electric car technology and encouraging car-sharing. Overall, electric cars have not become a norm in the automobile industry. However, if a technological niche successfully emerges in the market, it can transform into a market niche and solidify its place in the industry and the socio-technical regime. In turn, the regime, or industry, influences the landscape, which can change the economic climate and induce sustainable energy transitions. Therefore, SNM and GIP can break path dependency and solidify the place of green technologies in markets and society.

Green industrial policy can induce a green spiral and can also break path dependency. Economists view carbon pricing as the most compelling approach to the mitigation of climate change, but their opinion ignores the political cost of the radical adoption of carbon pricing and its lack of political feasibility. Consequently, the immediate adoption of carbon pricing often fails, and carbon pricing schemes often adapt to the demands of the polluters, which makes them ineffective. GIP addresses the issue of a lack of political feasibility through green spiral.

Green spiral means that GIP and carbon pricing approaches are most effective when policymakers produce them in a sequence to increase climate policy support over time and encourage positive feedback. GIP encourages increases in policy support as it contributes to the growth of a political landscape of coalitions and interests, such as renewable energy firms and investors, that benefit from energy transformation. Those alliances and interests generate political support for GIP, even when unsustainable industries may oppose it. They also become political allies during the development of stricter climate policy that negatively affects polluters. Thus, GIP creates positive feedback. Early GIP helps green industries expand, and the more they expand, the more support increases for decarbonized energy systems, and the easier it becomes to apply stricter climate policy. A green spiral makes sustainability feasible, attractive, and profitable for industries, which encourages the adoption of sustainable business techniques. For example, feed-in tariffs create direct incentives for the growth of green industry groups and can push sustainable shifts in investment and revenues. These shifts then create support for policy and technology experimentation, and they induce progress towards system-wide transformation. A green spiral can create energy transitions to renewables and lower the political costs of transitions.

=== Environmental benefits ===
GIP does not immediately create a radical transformation to a green economy, but it represents practical steps towards it, and energy transitions are one of its primary goals. Without government intervention in the economy, it is unlikely that the current market will transition towards a low-carbon economy. GIP also increases political support for further climate policy. Therefore, GIP has the potential for environmental benefits. Green technologies emit fewer greenhouse gases (GHG) and use fewer resources or economize on renewable resources. A majority of natural scientists agree that an enormous reduction in GHGs is essential to mitigate the effects of climate change, such as a rise in global temperatures, droughts, floods, extreme weather events, diseases, food shortages, and species extinction. Since GIP can reduce GHG emissions, it can protect the environment, and in turn, it can preserve the health, safety, and security of humans and other species. Not all green industrial policies are successful in achieving a reduction in emissions, but some form of failure is inevitable within the policy and economic realms, and governments learn from failures to improve future policy. Immediate action is necessary to address climate change and protect the environment, and GIP offers the tools to do so.

=== Worker benefits ===
GIP creates sunrise policies and sunset policies that produce benefits for employees. Sunrise policies aim to set up and develop new technologies or grow green sectors, and they create new employment opportunities in green industries. For instance, GIP investment in research and development helped develop the renewable energy sector in Germany. GIP led to a booming German renewable energy industry that employs over 371,000 people, which is double the number of jobs that were available in 2004. Investment in innovation can also increase economic growth, which can create further benefits, such as job availability, job stability, and increased salaries. In contrast, sunset policies support declining industries to allow for a smooth economic transition away from energy-intensive industries towards sustainable ones. Sunset policies are expensive, but they are often a requirement for the political acceptability of energy transitions. Examples include retraining schemes for workers in declining industries, funding to adjust production technologies to make them more sustainable, and social safety nets, including unemployment insurance. To conclude, GIP is beneficial for both the environment and workers, which creates political support for climate policy and makes energy transitions just and feasible.

== Risks ==
Proponents and skeptics of GIP acknowledge that it involves numerous risks. Arguments against GIP state that governments cannot make practical choices about which firms or industries to support, and subsequently, they will make mistakes and waste valuable resources. Additionally, GIP raises concerns about rent-seeking and regulatory capture. Government intervention in markets can create rent-seeking behaviour - or the manipulation of policy to increase profits - so GIP may become driven by political concerns rather than economic ones. Subsidies are particularly prone to rent-seeking as special interests may lobby intensely to maintain subsidies, even when they are no longer needed, while taxpayers who may want to abolish subsidies have fewer resources for lobbying. Political capture of economic policy leads to a reluctance to abandon a failing or expensive policy, and if rent-seeking occurs, a policy is bound to be ineffective, which will waste resources.

Inadequate policy design can also lead to the failure of GIP. Failure is likely if GIP does not have clear objectives, benchmarks to measure success, close monitoring, and exit strategies. For instance, the U.S. government partially funded Solyndra, an energy efficiency firm in California, United States. The funding came from poorly planned policy, and it experienced political capture, which led to its failure.

GIP is also not an immediate solution, so skeptics argue that it constitutes ineffective action to address climate change.

Trade disputes are another risk because GIP created a new strand of trade and environment conflicts within the World Trade Organization (WTO). For example, policies with local content requirements have induced several trade disputes.

Finally, coordination failure is a significant risk, as green innovation requires inter-agency, inter-sectoral, and public-private coordination, which can be difficult to produce, and requires strong institutions. Thus, there are several potential issues of GIP, but there are several approaches to address the risks.

=== Addressing risks ===
While proponents of GIP discuss several ways to mitigate risks, some instances of targeting the wrong firms or industries are inevitable because some degree of failure is inherent in GIP effort. Profit cannot measure success, but rather, success occurs with the creation of environmental and technological externalities. Governments can take several steps to lower risks and ensure success. For example, they can make sufficient choices about which industries or companies to support to avoid failure. Governments can also avoid using the wrong policy instruments if they experiment in select parts of the country before applying policy country-wide. Policy learning and lesson drawing from industrial policy and GIP can also foster the adoption of correct policy instruments. Further, rent-seeking can be an issue, but the creation of rent attracts investors into risky green technology fields. Rent management can avoid the problem by dictating the correct amount of profit, appropriately offering profit incentives, and withdrawing them when markets can function on their own. Governments must also work with the private sector, and the two should have a mutual interest and understanding of the issues each seeks to address, although governments must avoid capture by the private sector. Independent monitoring of policy progress, strong institutions, consumer protection agencies, and a free press can deal with the risk of political capture. Furthermore, clear objectives, consistent monitoring, evaluation techniques, and exit strategies can strengthen policies. Policies can avoid trade disputes through the process of policy learning and by adhering to WTO rules. Policymakers can also evade ineffective GIP through the creation of a transparent and accountable political coalition of actors, which includes public-private partnerships, business alliances, and civil society. A strong coalition also addresses coordination failures. The extra risks of GIP options could avoid future costs by increasing progress toward more ambitious cuts in emissions. As a result, GIP that is politically optimal may be economically optimal in the long-run, even if it experiences immediate inefficiencies.

== Examples ==
=== Subsidies ===
Subsidies help offset the private costs of green investments. Subsidies for a targeted sector are the most common form of GIP. The WTO defines three types of government subsidies. The first is governments transfers or private transfers mandated by the government that create budgetary outlays. The second is programs that provide goods or services below cost, and the third is regulatory policies that create transfers from one person or group to another. The International Energy Agency predicts that subsidies for green energy will expand to almost $250 billion in 2035, compared to $39 billion in 2007. Subsidies directly contributed to the growth of renewable energy industries, and the positive benefits spread globally as the cost of renewables steadily declined. The WTO has rules that constrain subsidies to avoid rent-seeking.

=== Research and development ===
Research and development (R&D) is an essential GIP instrument because it generates green technologies. An example of green R&D is the scientific agency United States Geological Survey (USGS), which is a part of the United States government. It receives government funding for the USGS Climate R&D Program, which seeks to mitigate the complex issues of climate change. Another example is the Program of Energy Research and Development, which is run by the Canadian federal government. It provides R&D funding for federal departments and agencies, such as Agriculture and Agri-Food Canada and Transport Canada. The federal government encourages the departments and agencies to collaborate with the private sector, international organizations, universities, and provincial and municipal governments. Similar to the American program, the objective of the Canadian program is to create a sustainable energy future.

=== Local content requirements ===
Local content requirements (LCRs) mean that in the production process, producers must obtain a certain minimum percentage of goods, labour, or services from local sources. Ontario, Canada passed legislation with local content requirements in 2009 called the Green Energy and Green Economy Act. Its objectives were to expand renewable energy production and use, promote the conservation of energy, and create new green employment. The Act required Ontario-made content in renewable electricity generators, such as wind and solar farms, for the generators to be eligible for government subsidies. It created many jobs, lowered GHG emissions, and vastly expanded the renewable energy industry in Ontario. Japan and the European Union disputed the requirements, and the WTO ruled that Ontario must remove LCRs from the Act. The trade dispute and its WTO decision had adverse effects in Ontario, as support for green innovation declined, and worldwide, as many countries that used LCRs in successful GIP learned that LCRs violate WTO regulations.

=== Feed-in tariffs ===
Feed-in tariffs (FITs) are a series of policies that create long-term financial encouragement for renewable energy generation. There are different versions of FITs. One version provides a fixed price for renewables, and the price is usually higher than the market rate for non-renewable energy. The fixed price guarantee counteracts the increased costs that renewable energy producers experience, and the elimination of a cost disadvantage encourages investment and innovation. Germany's FIT approach has received worldwide acclaim as it transformed Germany into a renewable energy leader.

=== Tax credits and incentives ===
There are several green tax credits available for individuals and businesses to create financial incentives for eco-conscious actions. Several countries have tax credits for electric vehicles, including Canada, the United States, Australia, and countries in Europe. In the United States, Internal Revenue Code Section 30D provides a tax credit for plug-in electric vehicles, and the total amount of credit available is $7,500. In Belgium, the registration fee for vehicles does not apply to electric cars and plug-in hybrids. Additionally, corporations with zero-emissions automobiles have a deductibility rate of 120 percent. Several other European countries have exemptions from car-related taxes, including Austria, Bulgaria, Czech Republic, Denmark, Finland, France, Germany, Greece, Hungary, Ireland, Italy, Luxembourg, the Netherlands, Portugal, Romania, Slovakia, Spain, Sweden, and the United Kingdom.

=== Export restrictions ===
Export restrictions involve inhibiting exports of a resource with the objective of increasing competitiveness of a domestic industry that relies on the resource. The limits use taxes or quotas, or a combination of them. China restricted the export of minerals and rare earth elements and argued that restrictions constrain production, which decreases environmental harm. The limitations are for China's economic benefit, but extracting and refining the resources indeed causes environmental damage, so the policy does protect the environment. However, export restrictions can distort the trade market and negatively affect foreign consumers, which can lead to WTO challenges.

=== Mandates ===
Renewable energy mandates require that companies or consumers produce or sell a certain amount of energy from renewables. Australia's Small-scale Renewable Energy Scheme is an incentive for individual citizens and small-scale businesses to install renewable energy systems, such as rooftop solar systems. Its Large-scale Renewable Energy Target requires an increase in annual renewable electricity generation. Of the power that electricity retailers provide, 12.75 percent of it must be renewable to be eligible for subsidies. Australian electricity consumers pay for the subsidies that support the scheme.

=== Green public procurement ===
Green public procurement (GPP) occurs when governments obtain goods, works, and services that are sustainable and environmentally friendly. Rules encourage the public sector to purchase green products and supplies, such as energy efficient computers, recycled paper, green cleaning services, electric vehicles, and renewable energy. These rules can drive green innovation and produce financial savings. Also, GPP can create economic growth and increase the sales of eco-industries. An example of GPP is A Plan for Public Procurement: food and catering in the United Kingdom, which encourages sustainable food procurement for the public sector and its suppliers, and it sets out a vision for specific targets and outcomes. The policy addresses issues such as energy use, water and waste, seasonality, animal welfare, and fair trade.

=== Renewable portfolio standards ===
Renewable portfolio standards (RPS) are regulatory mandates that support increased production of renewables. Standards set a minimum amount for annual production of renewable energy. In Michigan, the United States, the 2016 Clean, Renewable and Efficient Energy Act requires that electric providers increase their supply of renewables from 10 percent in 2015 to 15 percent in 2021, with an interim requirement of 12.5 percent in 2019 and 2020. In the United States, state-level RPS have driven the development of renewable energy. RPS-motivated development accounted for 60 percent of American new renewable development in 2012.

== See also ==
- Climate change mitigation
- Energy transition
- Green New Deal
- Industrial policy
- Low-carbon economy
- The Lucas Plan
- Path dependence
- Positive feedback
- Public-private partnership
