= Dennis Yao =

Federal Trade Commission personnel

Dennis A. Yao

Commissioner of the Federal Trade Commission
- In office July 16, 1991 – August 31, 1994
- President: George H. W. Bush; Bill Clinton
- Preceded by: Andy Strenio
- Succeeded by: Christine Varney

Personal details
- Born: Dennis Alden Yao; August 29, 1953 (age 72) Urbana, Illinois
- Party: Democratic
- Education: Princeton University (B.S.E.); U.C. Berkeley (M.B.A); Stanford GSB (Ph.D)

Dennis Alden Yao (born August 29, 1953) is an American academic who served as a member of the Federal Trade Commission (FTC) from 1991 to 1994. A member of the Democratic Party, Yao was the first Asian American to serve on the FTC and the third career economist to serve on the body, which has generally been composed of attorneys. Yao is currently the Lawrence E. Fouraker Professor of Business Administration and Chair of the Doctoral Programs at Harvard Business School.

== Early life and education ==
Dennis Alden Yao was born on August 29, 1953, in Urbana, Illinois. In 1975, he received his undergraduate (B.S.E.) degree in engineering from Princeton University. Yao went on to receive his Master of Business Administration (M.B.A.) degree from the University of California, Berkeley in 1977.

After working in the private sector as a product planner for Ford Motor Company, Yao would receive his PhD in economics from the Stanford Graduate School of Business in 1985.

== Career ==
=== Academic career ===
From 1983 to 1991, Yao served in various academic capacities within the Wharton School of Business of the University of Pennsylvania. At Wharton, he developed and taught a class that focused on strategies for competition within an oligopolistic framework called “Competitive Strategy and Industrial Structure.”

=== Federal Trade Commission (FTC) ===
While serving as an associate professor at the Wharton's department of public policy and management, Yao was chosen by President George H. W. Bush to replace Andrew Strenio on the Federal Trade Commission (FTC). Yao was the third career economist to serve on the FTC, an agency generally composed of attorneys, after James C. Miller III and George W. Douglas.

During his tenure on the FTC, Yao was among the members favorable to bringing action against Microsoft, which at the time was the subject of antitrust scrutiny. During a meeting between members of the FTC and Microsoft corporate leadership, the "soft-spoken" Yao reportedly upset Bill Gates by "float[ing] a line of hypothetical questions suggesting possible curbs on Microsoft’s growing monopoly power". As a result:

"Gates was vexed. "He started by calling Yao’s ideas socialistic," recalls a source familiar with the July 15 meeting, "and as he got angrier and angrier and louder and louder, he got into calling them Communistic."

Following the inauguration of Bill Clinton as President of the United States in 1993, Yao was briefly considered for the role of FTC Chair. However, after serving three years of a seven-year term, Yao chose to resign from the FTC on September 1, 1994, in order to return to teaching at the University of Pennsylvania. In 1994, he was replaced as a member of the FTC by Christine Varney.

=== Career post-FTC ===
Yao currently serves as a Professor of Business Administration at Harvard Business School. In 2018, he was a contributor to Daniel Koh's congressional candidacy in Massachusetts's 3rd district.
