= Alan Larson =

American diplomat

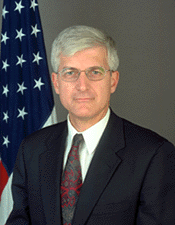

15th Under Secretary of State for Economic, Business, and Agricultural Affairs
- In office November 24, 1999 – February 25, 2005
- President: Bill Clinton; George W. Bush
- Preceded by: Stuart E. Eizenstat
- Succeeded by: Josette Sheeran

10th United States Ambassador to the Organisation for Economic Co-operation and Development
- In office June 28, 1990 – June 23, 1993
- President: George H. W. Bush
- Preceded by: Denis Lamb
- Succeeded by: David L. Aaron

20th Assistant Secretary of State for Economic and Business Affairs
- In office 1996–1999
- President: Bill Clinton
- Preceded by: Daniel Tarullo
- Succeeded by: Earl Anthony Wayne

Personal details
- Born: July 19, 1949 (age 77) Osage, Iowa
- Spouse: Nancy Naden Larson
- Children: 3
- Education: University of Iowa (BA, political science, '71; MA, economics, '78; Ph.D., economics, '82); Johns Hopkins School of Advanced International Studies
- Awards: United States Career Ambassador (2004); Secretary of State’s Distinguished Service Award, Department of State (2005)

Alan Philip Larson (born July 19, 1949) is a diplomat and a former United States Ambassador to the Organisation for Economic Co-operation and Development (OECD) in 1990–93. From 1996 to 1999, he served as U.S. Department of State Assistant Secretary for Economic and Business Affairs. In 1999 to 2005, he also served as US Undersecretary of State for Economic, Business, and Agricultural Affairs, OECD. He is a United States Career Ambassador, and a recipient of the Secretary of State’s Distinguished Service Award.

Larson currently serves as the Senior International Policy Advisor for Covington & Burling.

== Personal life ==
Larson was born in Osage, Iowa, and later lived in Webster City, Iowa, Iowa City, Iowa, and Reston, Virginia. His foreign language is French. He is married to Nancy Naden Larson, and they have a daughter and two sons.

== Education ==
Larson has a BA (political science, '71), an MA (economics, '78), and a Ph.D. in economics ('82) from the University of Iowa. He received the 2003 University of Iowa Distinguished Alumni Achievement Award. He also attended the Johns Hopkins School of Advanced International Studies.

== Career ==
=== 1973-89 ===
In 1973 Larson joined the U.S. Department of State and began a career as a United States Foreign Service officer. From 1973-75, he was first posted to the American Embassy in Sierra Leone as an economic officer.

From 1975 to 1977, Larson then had an assignment in Kinshasa, Zaire. Next, he engaged in economic studies at the University of Iowa. In 1978, he became Deputy Director of the Department of State’s Energy Policy Office.

Larson then had a tour in the economic section of the US Embassy in Kingston, Jamaica. In 1984-86, he served as an executive assistant to the Under Secretary for Economic Affairs.

In 1986, Larson was named Deputy Assistant Secretary for International Energy and Resources Policy. He then served as Principal Deputy Assistant Secretary of State for Economic and Business Affairs.

=== 1990-2005 ===
In 1990-93, Larson was the United States Ambassador to the Organisation for Economic Co-operation and Development (OECD) in Paris, France.

From 1993-96, Larson served as Principal Deputy Assistant Secretary of State in the Economic Bureau, as well as Deputy Assistant Secretary for International Finance and Development.

From 1996-99, he served as U.S. Department of State Assistant Secretary for Economic and Business Affairs.

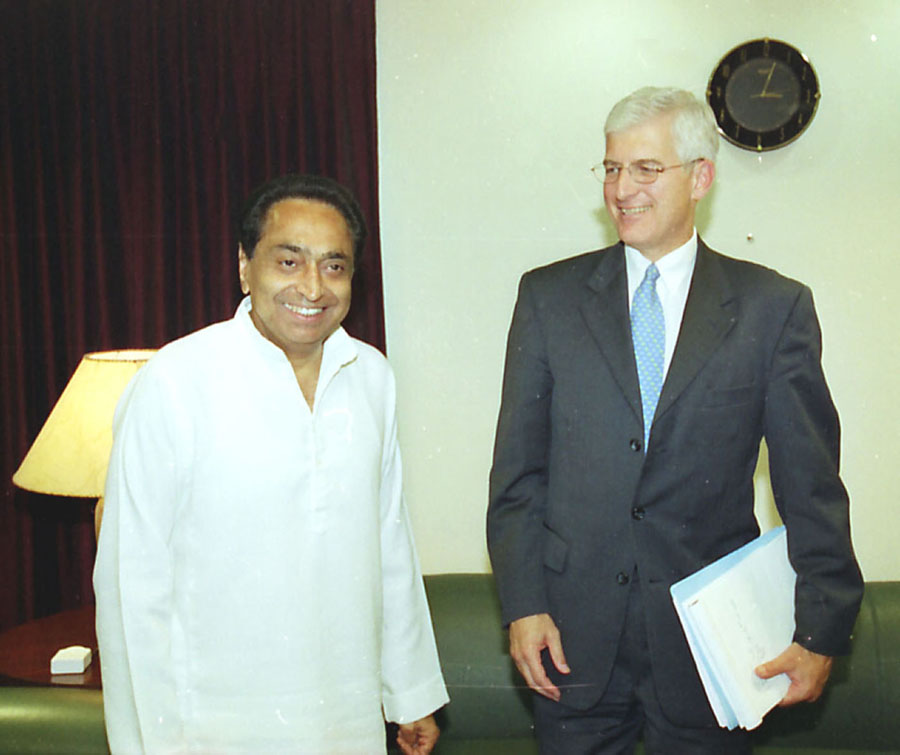
Larson and Union Minister for Commerce and Industry Shri Kamal Nath in New Delhi, India, in 2004.

In 1999–2005, appointed by President Clinton, Larson served as US Undersecretary of State for Economic, Business, and Agricultural Affairs (the first career Foreign Service officer to hold this office; he was reappointed by President George W. Bush in 2001, becoming the only individual in this role to be supported by both Democratic and Republican administrations), OECD, as senior economic advisor to Secretary of State Colin Powell, with his responsibilities including the entire range of international economic policy.

=== 2005-present ===
Larson currently serves as the Senior International Policy Advisor for Covington & Burling, a position he has held since 2005. In that capacity he advises clients on matters at the intersection of international business and public policy. He is also Chairman of the Coalition for Integrity, an NGO which fights corruption and promotes integrity in the United States and around the world.

== Honors ==
Larson is a United States Career Ambassador (awarded 2004), the State Department’s highest honor. He was awarded the 2013 Foreign Service Cup, given by the US State Department in recognition of a foreign service officer’s career in the foreign service and afterwards on behalf of their communities. Larson's awards include the Secretary of State’s Distinguished Service Award, Department of State (2005), and Superior Honor, Presidential Distinguished, and performance awards.

He is a member of the American Academy of Diplomacy.

== See also ==
- List of ambassadors of the United States to the Organisation for Economic Co-operation and Development

Government offices
Preceded by Stuart E. Eizenstat	Under Secretary of State for Economic, Business, and Agricultural Affairs; November 24, 1999 – February 25, 2005	Succeeded by Josette Sheeran
