= William Parrett =

William Parrett may refer to:

- William F. Parrett (1825–1895), U.S. Representative from Indiana
- William G. Parrett (born 1945), American executive
