= Daniel Yohannes =

American businessman

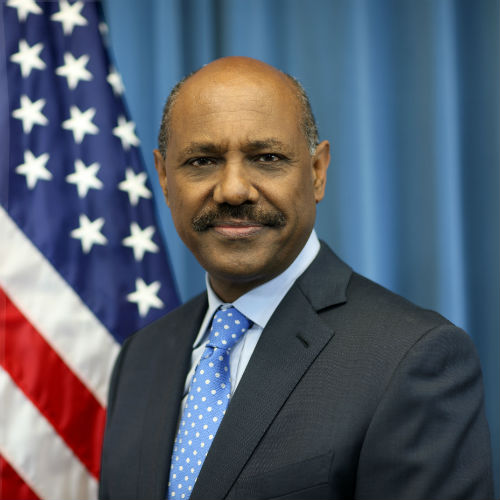

United States Ambassador to the OECD
- In office May 2, 2014 – January 20, 2017
- President: Barack Obama
- Preceded by: Karen Kornbluh
- Succeeded by: Jack Markell (2022)

CEO of the Millennium Challenge Corporation
- In office November 2009 – May 2014
- President: Barack Obama
- Preceded by: John Danilovich
- Succeeded by: Sean Cairncross

Personal details
- Born: September 22, 1952 (age 74) Addis Ababa, Ethiopian Empire
- Party: Democratic
- Spouse: Saron Yohannes
- Education: Claremont McKenna College; Pepperdine University

Daniel W. Yohannes (Amharic: ዳንኤል ዮሐንስ; born September 22, 1952) is an Ethiopian-American businessman and philanthropist who was the U.S. Ambassador to the OECD from 2014 to 2017.

From 2009 to 2014, he was the CEO of the Millennium Challenge Corporation (MCC), an independent U.S. foreign aid agency. Before his government service, he worked in the financial services industry, as president of M&R Investments, as well as roles at U.S. Bank, Colorado National Bank, and Security Pacific Bank. In July 2006 John Hickenlooper appointed Yohannes to be co-chairman of the Greenprint Council, a group charged with overseeing the city of Denver’s sustainability plan, and in November 2006, Colorado Governor Bill Ritter named him to oversee his transition team.

== Early life and family ==
Born in Addis Ababa, Ethiopia, on September 22, 1952, Yohannes completed elementary school at the Nativity Boys' School and went on to St. Joseph’s, a prestigious Catholic high school in the Ethiopian capital. He is fluent in Amharic.

In 1970, at the age of 17, Yohannes immigrated to the United States from Ethiopia. He finished high school in Los Angeles and went on to college, earning a B.A. in economics from Claremont McKenna College and an M.B.A. from Pepperdine University.

Yohannes is married to Saron Yohannes. They have three children.

== Career ==
=== Financial services ===
Yohannes began his career in the financial services industry. In 1977, he started at Security Pacific National Bank (now Bank of America) as a management trainee. Working his way up the ranks, Yohannes eventually became executive vice president before leaving in 1992. Yohannes then relocated to Denver to work for the First Bank System, as president of Colorado National Bank from 1992 to 1999. During his tenure, the bank grew from $2 billion to $9 billion in assets. Also during this time, Colorado National Bank was acquired by U.S. Bank and Yohannes became CEO of U.S. Bank’s Colorado division. Yohannes was subsequently named vice chairman and member of the management committee at U.S. Bank. He was named president of the division in 2002, and departed in 2003, stating that “it was time to do something different."

Yohannes followed his passion for protecting the environment through practical, sustainable methods by co-founding the New Resource Bank in San Francisco in 2006. The New Resource Bank invests in green projects and environmentally sustainable businesses.

Yohannes also was president of M&R Investments, an investment firm specializing in real estate, financial institutions and the green sector.

=== Millennium Challenge Corporation ===
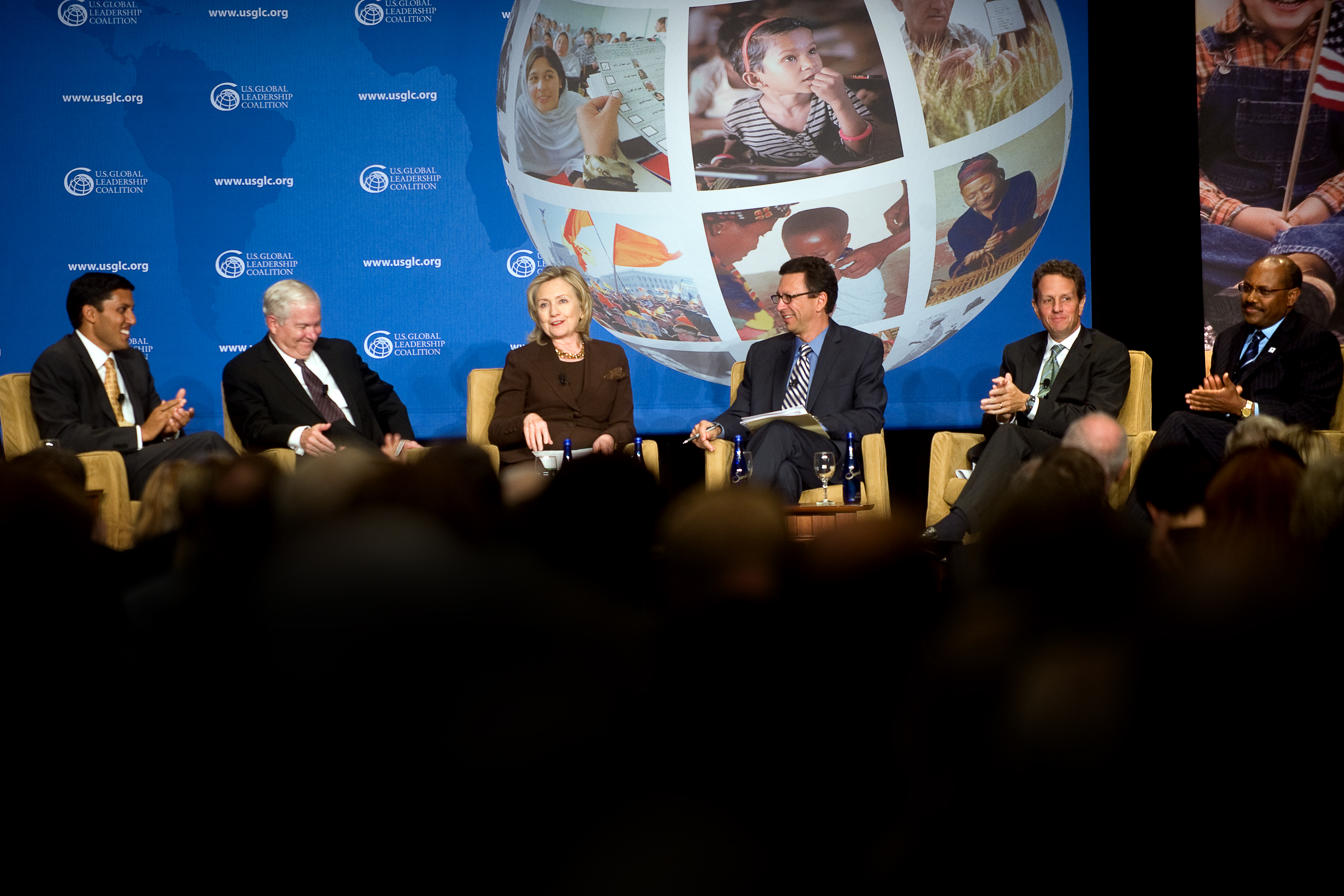
From left, USAID Administrator Rajiv Shah; U.S. Secretary of Defense Robert Gates; Secretary of State Hillary Rodham Clinton; moderator Frank Sesno, director of the School of Media and Public Affairs at George 100928-D-JB366-103

In September 2009, President Barack Obama nominated Yohannes as CEO of the Millennium Challenge Corporation, a U.S. development agency that aims to reduce global poverty by investing in select countries that demonstrate a commitment to good governance.

On November 20, 2009, the Senate Foreign Relations Committee confirmed Yohannes. Upon his confirmation, Yohannes stated, "It is challenging to replace patronage with partnership and to deliver smart aid that matters by encouraging good policies, country-led development, and sustainable results. MCC offers some important lessons on where to start. MCC lays an innovative foundation to address the complex problem of global poverty."

Described by CNN as "Obama's man on global development," Yohannes brought his private sector expertise to the position, stating that, to bring the greatest returns to American taxpayers, MCC should be run effectively and efficiently, “just like a business." Under Yohannes' leadership, MCC started or completed investments of more than $9 billion in 25 countries on projects that lifted more than 173 million people out of poverty.

Yohannes led two Presidential Delegations while CEO of MCC- the first to Dakar, Senegal for President Macky Sall’s inauguration in April 2012, and the second to Accra, Ghana for the inauguration of President John Dramani Mahama in January 2013. In June 2013, President Obama invited Yohannes to join him during his trip to Africa. Yohannes accompanied the president in Senegal from June 27–28 and in Tanzania from July 1–2, where the U.S. delegation announced the administration's Power Africa initiative, in which MCC plays a role.

While at the MCC, Yohannes stressed the importance of investment and development to "the economic future and national security of the United States." Referring to MCC's work in Africa, Yohannes stated that, "in addition to helping many African partners become self sufficient...we're also creating the next markets for American products and services." Yohannes also advocated for a holistic approach to development that looks beyond capacity-building and production to improving access to markets and fostering trade.

Yohannes departed MCC for the OECD during its landmark 10th anniversary year, after having helped cement MCC's reputation as an innovative development agency that pushes the envelope on results, evidence-driven decision-making, accountability, and data transparency.

=== U.S. Ambassador to the OECD ===
Yohannes took up his duties as U.S. Ambassador to the OECD on May 2, 2014. He was nominated by President Barack Obama on September 11, 2013, and confirmed by the U.S. Senate on April 9, 2014.

As ambassador, Yohannes has established climate change, tax reform, governance, development, and inequality as top priorities for the United States at the OECD. In cooperation with the Department of Treasury, he secured agreement for new international tax rules that helps reduce tax avoidance among multinational corporations and prevent double taxation. In November 2015, he facilitated a landmark agreement to restrict the use of export credits for coal-fired power plants. He also worked closely with the Department of Energy of Department of State to chair the International Energy Agency (IEA) Ministerial, which modernized the IEA and aligned its mission and activities with the current energy landscape.

In 2015, Yohannes began a sustained effort to strengthen and expand the OECD’s work to address rising inequality. In July, he published a joint op-ed with OECD Secretary-General José Ángel Gurría, arguing that the United States can lead a global transition towards a more inclusive model of economic growth. In October, he created a Friends of Inclusive Growth group, then leveraged his role as chair to foster collaboration with local government and private sector leaders. Explaining his strategy, he compared rising inequality to climate change, arguing that: “in the case of the climate movement, cities, NGO’s and businesses took the lead in policy experimentation and advocacy, laying the groundwork for action at the national level. They can do the same on inequality. They can lead a global movement for inclusive economic growth.” Yohannes encouraged and supported the creation of a network of Champion Mayors for Inclusive Growth, launched at the Ford Foundation on March 29, 2016. At the second meeting of Champion Mayors, he announced that he had obtained funding from the Department of State for a dedicated web platform that would strengthen collaboration between mayors and educate the public about inclusive growth. Yohannes also led outreach to the private sector, hosting the launch of the OECD Initiative on Business and Inclusive Growth on November 15, 2016.

Publicly, Yohannes insisted on the strategic value of the OECD to the United States, calling the organization “an extension of U.S. foreign policy” and “a powerful instrument to promote our values worldwide.” He was outspoken about the need for a sustained focus on gender at the OECD, arguing that “gender cannot be a side issue, a separate funding stream or an afterthought; it must be woven into the fabric of the organization so that it informs every single issue the OECD addresses.” And he pressed the OECD to make the economic case for LGBT inclusivity, arguing that “there are real costs to society when a significant segment is cut off from health care, social benefits or social protection.” Thanks to his efforts to obtain funding and generate support among other OECD members, the OECD launched a research project with the goal of developing evidence-based policy recommendations for LGBT inclusivity.

Yohannes also spoke publicly about how his experience as an immigrant inspired his public service: “I wanted to give back to the country that gave me so much,” he wrote. A strong advocate for diversity, he argued that “in diplomacy as in every other area, America’s greatest resource is its difference.” In June 2016, Yohannes co-hosted the first-ever Ethiopian American Policy Briefing at the White House. In his opening remarks, he told Ethiopian Americans that “America’s melting pot is a recipe for success” and that “what we make of our immigrant experience is up to us.”

== Boards and community service ==
Yohannes is active in his community and has been on various boards and civil organizations, including sitting on the board of Project C.U.R.E (Commission on Urgent Relief & Equipment), an organization that delivers donated medical supplies and equipment to more than 120 developing nations around the world, and the National Jewish Hospital. Yohannes helped to fund the building of a new research and medical facility at the hospital, the Iris and Michael Smith Clinics and Laboratories, which opened in 2007.

Yohannes was co-chair of the 23rd G8 summit in Denver, Colorado, in 1997 along with Bill Coors and Gail Schoettler. In this capacity, Yohannes was responsible for raising the funds necessary to host the summit. Yohannes was recognized in Denver for the significant role he played in making the summit possible.

Yohannes was also an advocate for Denver Sister Cities International, playing an influential role in pairing Denver with the Ethiopian city of Axum. In 1995, after the match was made official, Yohannes co-led a delegation of Denver officials and business leaders on a visit to Axum.

Yohannes has been on the Smithsonian National Board and the board of directors of Media One (now Comcast).

In 2006, while on the board of trustees of Denver Art Museum, Yohannes and his family endowed the museum’s first African art gallery. Beyond providing the new gallery space in the museum, Yohannes aided in expanding the museum’s African art collection.

He has been on the boards of the University of Washington Michael G. Foster School of Business, the Pacific Coast Banking School, the Boy Scouts of America, the First Western Trust Bank, the New Resource Bank, and the board of advisors for the University of Colorado Medical School.

On April 1, 2019, Yohannes was named a director of the newly formed Dow Inc.

== Memberships and Honors ==
In February 2013, outgoing Secretary of State Hillary Clinton awarded Yohannes with the State Department’s highest honor, the Secretary’s Distinguished Service Award.

In June 2013, Yohannes was invited to join the Council of Foreign Relations.

In 2013, Yohannes was named to Washington Life Magazine’s Power 100 list.

Similarly, in 2012, he was included on Paris-based The Africa Report’s list of the top 50 most influential Africans.

Three foreign governments have also recognized Yohannes’ service and leadership. The Government of the Philippines awarded him its Citation of the Order of Sikatuna with the rank of Grand Cross, Silver Distinction in October 2014. Benin honored him with its National Order of Merit, Commander. Yohannes also received the Honduran Medal of Merit, Commander.

Diplomatic posts
| Preceded by Karen Kornbluh | United States Ambassador to the OECD; 2014–2017 | Succeeded by Jack Markell |
