= List of ambassadors of the United States to the Organisation for Economic Co-operation and Development =

The following is a list of United States ambassadors to the Organisation for Economic Co-operation and Development in Paris, France. The official title for the position is the Representative of the U.S.A. to the Organisation for Economic Cooperation and Development, with the rank of Ambassador. In the absence of an ambassador, the Deputy Permanent Representative assumes the role of interim Permanent Representative and heads USOECD as Chargé d'Affaires. The current Ambassador is John Hurley.

== Office holders ==
The following is a chronological list of those who have held the office:

No.	Image	Ambassador	Time served	Classification	OECD Secretary-General	U.S. President
1		John W. Tuthill	October 4, 1961 – October 22, 1962	Career FSO	Thorkil Kristensen	John F. Kennedy
2		John M. Leddy	October 3, 1962 – June 15, 1965	Political appointee	Thorkil Kristensen	John F. Kennedy
2		John M. Leddy	October 3, 1962 – June 15, 1965	Political appointee	Thorkil Kristensen	Lyndon B. Johnson
3		Philip H. Trezise	October 26, 1965 – July 7, 1969	Career FSO	Thorkil Kristensen	Lyndon B. Johnson
3		Philip H. Trezise	October 26, 1965 – July 7, 1969	Career FSO	Thorkil Kristensen	Richard Nixon
4		Joseph A. Greenwald	July 22, 1969 – October 12, 1972	Career FSO	Thorkil Kristensen	Richard Nixon
4		Joseph A. Greenwald	July 22, 1969 – October 12, 1972	Career FSO	Emiel van Lennep	Richard Nixon
5		William C. Turner	May 23, 1974 – May 1, 1977	Political appointee	Emiel van Lennep	Richard Nixon
5		William C. Turner	May 23, 1974 – May 1, 1977	Political appointee	Emiel van Lennep	Gerald Ford
5		William C. Turner	May 23, 1974 – May 1, 1977	Political appointee	Emiel van Lennep	Jimmy Carter
6		Herbert Salzman	June 8, 1977 – March 30, 1981	Political appointee	Emiel van Lennep	Jimmy Carter
6		Herbert Salzman	June 8, 1977 – March 30, 1981	Political appointee	Emiel van Lennep	Ronald Reagan
7		Abraham Katz	July 30, 1981 – May 24, 1984	Career FSO	Emiel van Lennep	Ronald Reagan
8		Edward Streator	August 13, 1984 – June 15, 1987	Career FSO	Emiel van Lennep	Ronald Reagan
8		Edward Streator	August 13, 1984 – June 15, 1987	Career FSO	Jean-Claude Paye	Ronald Reagan
9		Denis Lamb	June 15, 1987 – June 28, 1990	Career FSO	Jean-Claude Paye	Ronald Reagan
9		Denis Lamb	June 15, 1987 – June 28, 1990	Career FSO	Jean-Claude Paye	George H. W. Bush
10		Alan Philip Larson	June 28, 1990 – June 23, 1993	Career FSO	Jean-Claude Paye	George H. W. Bush
10		Alan Philip Larson	June 28, 1990 – June 23, 1993	Career FSO	Jean-Claude Paye	Bill Clinton
11		David Laurence Aaron	August 2, 1993 – November 26, 1997	Political appointee	Jean-Claude Paye	Bill Clinton
12		Amy L. Bondurant	November 28, 1997 – July 31, 2001	Political appointee	Donald Johnston	Bill Clinton
13		Jeanne L. Phillips	August 7, 2001 – June 2, 2003	Political appointee	Donald Johnston	George W. Bush
14		Connie Morella	August 1, 2003 – August 6, 2007	Political appointee	Donald Johnston	George W. Bush
15		Christopher F. Egan	October 29, 2007 – January 20, 2009	Political appointee	José Ángel Gurría	George W. Bush
15		Christopher F. Egan	October 29, 2007 – January 20, 2009	Political appointee	José Ángel Gurría	Barack Obama
16		Karen Kornbluh	August 12, 2009 – June 23, 2012	Political appointee	José Ángel Gurría	Barack Obama
17		Daniel Yohannes	May 2, 2014 – January 20, 2017	Political appointee	José Ángel Gurría	Barack Obama
18		Jack Markell	February 11, 2022 – August 21, 2023	Political appointee	Mathias Cormann	Joe Biden
19		Sean Patrick Maloney	April 2, 2024 – January 20, 2025	Political appointee	Mathias Cormann	Joe Biden
20		John Hurley	September 4, 2026 – Present	Political appointee	Mathias Cormann	Donald Trump
