= David L. Aaron =

American diplomat and writer (born 1938)

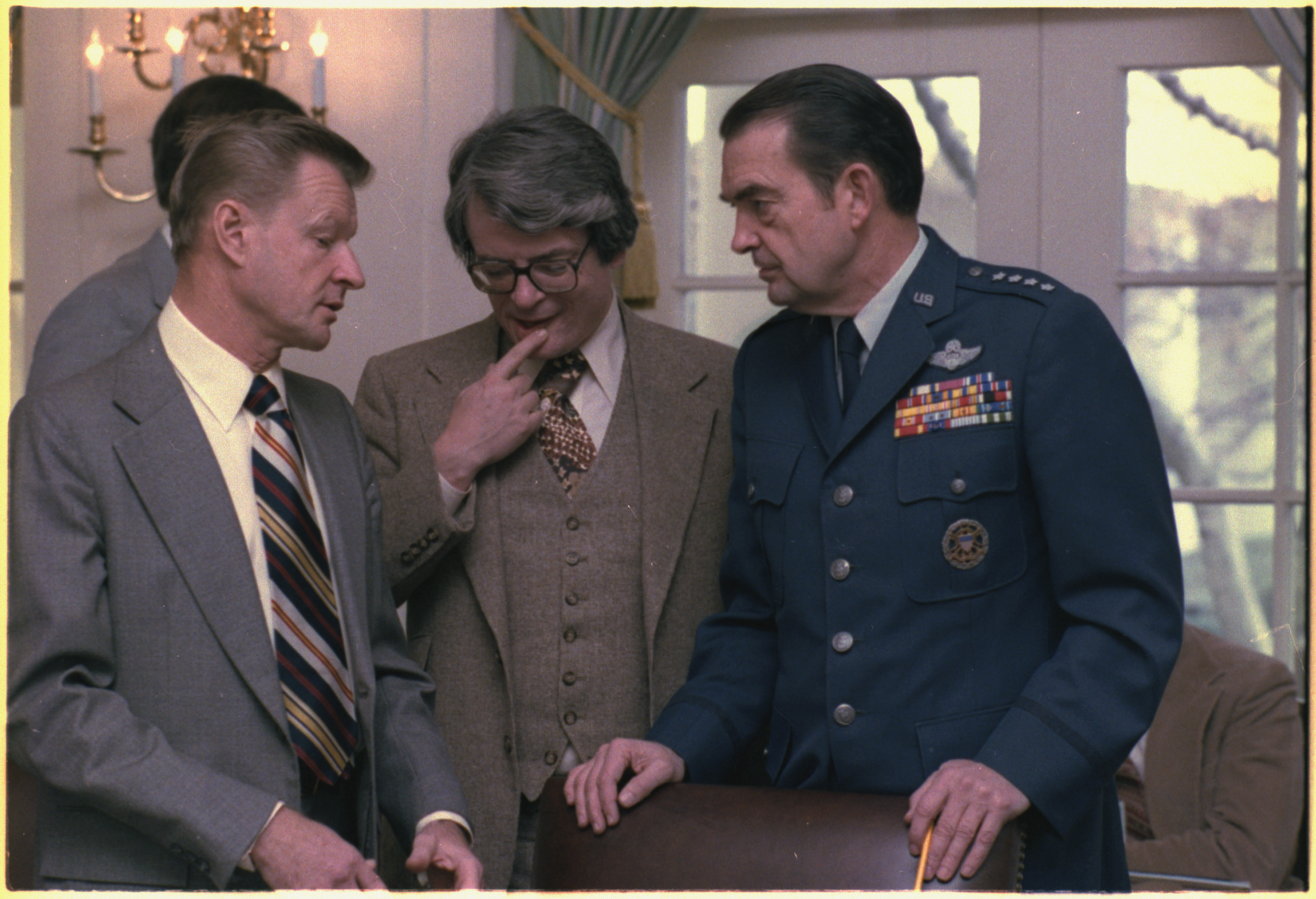
- David Aaron (center) with Zbigniew Brzezinski (left) and David Jones (right) in 1978

11th United States Ambassador to the Organisation for Economic Co-operation and Development
- In office August 2, 1993 – November 28, 1997
- President: Bill Clinton
- Preceded by: Alan Larson
- Succeeded by: Amy L. Bondurant

United States Deputy National Security Advisor
- In office January 20, 1977 – January 20, 1981
- President: Jimmy Carter
- Preceded by: William G. Hyland
- Succeeded by: James W. Nance

Personal details
- Born: August 21, 1938 (age 88) Chicago, Illinois, U.S.
- Party: Democratic
- Spouse: Chloe Aaron (m. 1962; died 2020)

David Laurence Aaron (born August 21, 1938) is an American diplomat and writer who served in the Jimmy Carter and Bill Clinton administrations. He graduated from Occidental College with a BA, and from Princeton University with an MPA. He later received an honorary Ph.D. from Occidental College. He is currently director of the RAND Corporation's Center for Middle East Public Policy.

== Background and early career ==
Aaron was born in Chicago, Illinois, United States. He entered the U.S. foreign service in 1962, where he served as a political and economic officer in Guayaquil, Ecuador. In 1964 he was assigned to the NATO desk at the Department of State. He subsequently served as a political officer to NATO where he worked on the Nuclear Planning Group and on the Non Proliferation Treaty.

He then joined the Arms Control and Disarmament Agency where he served as a member of the U.S. Delegation to the Strategic Arms Limitation Talks (SALT), during which Aaron was a key negotiator of an agreement with the Soviet Union to reduce the risk of nuclear weapon accidents. He was then recruited to serve on Henry Kissinger's National Security Council staff during the Nixon administration, from 1972 to 1974. During that time, Aaron drafted NSSM 242 on Nuclear Strategy, which came to be known as the Schlesinger Doctrine.

In 1974, on the recommendation of Zbigniew Brzezinski, Aaron became Senator Walter Mondale's legislative assistant. The following year, Aaron was task force leader of the Senate's Select Committee on Intelligence. He was the principal architect of the committee's recommendations. Aaron later followed Mondale to the Jimmy Carter Presidential campaign.

== Deputy National Security Advisor ==
In 1977, Aaron was asked by Brzezinski, who had been appointed the National Security Advisor, to become Deputy National Security Advisor in the administration of Jimmy Carter. Aaron was one of several former Kissinger aides appointed by Jimmy Carter to foreign policy and defense positions.

During his time at the White House, Aaron made a name for himself in foreign policy circles and was recognized as a rising star in the Democratic Party. Aaron was a special envoy to Africa, Latin America, China, Israel and Europe, and became a trusted envoy on Presidential missions. Shortly after Carter's inauguration, Aaron attended the Bilderberg Conference, in which he undertook lengthy private discussions with German Chancellor Helmut Schmidt. In Israel, Aaron worked with Moshe Dayan on the concept of "autonomy" for the Palestinians. This concept helped to open the door for the Camp David Agreements, which are understood to have structured peace between Egypt and Israel.

Aaron also represented the White House in talks with the Office of French President Valéry Giscard d'Estaing in Paris, as well as with the Cabinet Office at 10 Downing Street in London. President Carter tapped Aaron to lead an inter-agency mission to structure an agreement with European nations to deploy U.S. Pershing Missiles and Ground Launched Cruise Missiles in Europe, in response to the deployment of SS-20 Intermediate Missiles by the Soviet Union. He persuaded key governments to accept the U.S. deployments, as well as to seek negotiations with the U.S.S.R. for the future bilateral elimination of the deployments.

Aaron was also seen as a tough and sometimes controversial figure. The U.S. Ambassador in Paris complained that he was going behind his back in secret dealings with French President Giscard d'Estaing's office. In 1978, he came head to head with Director of Central Intelligence Turner of the CIA, on Turner's cutbacks and at the CIA. Aaron's image as a "tough customer" was intensified during an attack on North Yemen by South Yemen which was backed by the Soviet Union. President Carter, Brzezinski and Cyrus Vance were on a mission to Egypt and Israel. He remained in Washington to coordinate the U.S. response. Aaron's hard-line against Communist expansion led him to push for the dispatch of $400 million in arms to North Yemen. White House staff commented on his tough rule, one staff member was quoted as saying, "Believe it or not, people were relieved when Brzezinski got back to town".

== Post-government career ==
When Reagan became president in 1981, Aaron moved into the private sector, becoming vice president for Mergers and Acquisitions at Oppenheimer and Co. and Vice Chairman of Oppenheimer International. Aaron left Oppenheimer in 1985, to write and lecture, but went on to serve on the board of directors of Oppenheimer's Quest for Value Dual Purpose Fund. Over the next several years he published three novels (State Scarlet; Agent of Influence and Crossing By Night) which were translated into ten languages. He also wrote a television documentary, "The Lessons of the Gulf War", hosted by former Chairman of the Joint Chiefs of Staff William J. Crowe. He was also a consultant for the 20th Century Fund, from 1990 to 1992.

Aaron was involved in the election campaigns of Walter Mondale and Bill Clinton. In Mondale's campaign, Aaron played a leading role as senior consultant on foreign policy and defense. Aaron served in Clinton's foreign policy team during his election campaign.

== OECD Ambassador tenure and aftermath ==
In 1993 he became United States Permanent Representative to the Organization for Economic Cooperation and Development (OECD) in Paris, and in 1996 was assigned the additional job of White House Special Envoy for Cryptography. At the OECD he successfully negotiated the convention to Prohibit Bribery in International Business Transactions. As Special Envoy for Cryptography, Aaron pushed for a global standard that would require computer users with high grade encryption to submit keys to their codes for scrambling data to an independent authority, which would hold them in escrow and make them available to law enforcement only under a court order.

At the time, he argued that unbreakable codes in the hands of terrorists would threaten every country's security. However, he was attacked by advocates of privacy rights, who said that the compromise could easily be misused by Governments and corporations. In 1997 he was appointed Under Secretary of Commerce for International Trade, where ironically he negotiated privacy rules with the European Union on the handling of personal data.

After Clinton's second term in office, Aaron became senior international advisor at Dorsey & Whitney. He left Dorsey & Whitney in 2003 to join the RAND Corporation as a senior fellow. At RAND, he directs The Center For Middle East Public Policy and recently produced a non fiction book, "In their Own Words: Voices of Jihad", published by the RAND Corporation.

== Personal life ==
David married Chloe Aaron in 1962, with whom he had a son; his wife died in early 2020. He is a member of the American Ditchley Foundation, the Atlantic Council, the Council on Foreign Relations, the International League of Human Rights, the National Democratic Institute, and the Pacific Council on International Policy.

Legal offices
| Preceded by William G. Hyland | Deputy National Security Advisor; 1977–1981 | Succeeded by James W. Nance |
Political offices
| Preceded by Stuart E. Eizenstat | Under Secretary of Commerce for International Trade; 1997–2000 | Succeeded by Robert LaRussa |
