= Abraham Katz =

American diplomat

United States Ambassador to the OECD
- In office 1981–1984
- Preceded by: Herbert Salzman
- Succeeded by: Edward Streator

Personal details
- Born: December 4, 1926 Brooklyn, New York
- Died: February 5, 2013 (aged 86)
- Education: Brooklyn College (B.A., 1948); Columbia University, School of International Affairs (Master of International Affairs, 1950); Foreign Service Institute (1956); Harvard University (Ph.D., 1968)

Abraham Katz (December 4, 1926 – February 5, 2013) was an American diplomat who served as the United States Ambassador to the OECD from 1981 to 1984. He was also the President of the United States Council for International Business and the International Organisation of Employers.

== Early life ==
Katz was born in Brooklyn, NY, US. He was an alumnus of Brooklyn College, where he obtained his B.A. cum laude in political science in 1948. He further went to the School of International and Public Affairs, Columbia University, where he had his Master of International Affairs in 1950, and Harvard University, his Ph.D. in 1968. Katz resided in Hollywood, Florida and Washington, D.C., married to Marion Sheinberger in 1996, and had three children.

== Career ==
Katz worked in the United States Foreign Service. In 1950 he began his government career as a foreign affairs officer in the Department of State. In 1951 he was the Officer-in-charge of reimbursable military assistance, in the Office of the Special Assistant for Mutual Defense Assistance, in the Department. In 1951-53 he was vice consul and principal officer at the American consulate at Mérida, Yucatán, Mexico, and in 1953-55 he was second secretary and economic officer in the American embassy in Mexico, D.F.

1957-59 he was Chief, Foreign Economic Section, Soviet Union and Eastern Europe Division, Bureau of Intelligence and Research of the Department of State. In 1958-59 Katz was on the staff of President Eisenhower's Committee on World Economic Practices. In 1959-64 Katz was First Secretary of Delegation, U.S. Mission to NATO in Paris and European Regional Organizations (USRO), and Secretary of Delegation, U.S. Mission to OECD.

Katz was Counselor for Economic Affairs at the American Embassy in Moscow, in the USSR (1964–66). He attended the Center for International Affairs at Harvard University as a fellow in 1966-67.

In 1967-74 he was Director of the Office of OECD, European Communities and Atlantic Political Economic Affairs, Bureau of European Affairs, in the Department of State in Washington, D.C.

In 1974-78 Katz was Deputy Chief of the United States Mission to the OECD in Paris, France, with the diplomatic rank of Minister Counselor.

In October 1978-January 1980 he was on detail to the Department of Commerce as Deputy Assistant Secretary for International Economic Policy and Research. In 1980-81 Katz was on detail to the Department of Commerce as Assistant Secretary of Commerce for International Economic Policy, having been nominated by President Carter.

On July 9, 1981, President Reagan approved the nomination of Katz to be the Representative of the United States of America to the Organization for Economic Cooperation and Development, with the rank of Ambassador, a position that he held from August 1981 until May 31, 1984.

== Later life ==
Katz became President of the United States Council for International Business (USCIB) on June 1, 1984, a post from which he retired in 1999. He retired with the title of President Emeritus.

At the International Organisation of Employers General Council on May 30, 2006, Katz was elected President, a position he held through 2008, leading an organization then comprising 146 members from around the world. In this role, and as Employer Member of the ILO Governing Body, he advocated for the global business community in international forums. He retired as Honorary President.

Katz was also an author on political science and economics. He authored Politics of Economic Reform in the Soviet Union (1972), and The Atlantic Community Reappraised, A Washington Perspective, Proceedings of the Academy of Political Science, XXIX, 2, 1958.

He died in New York City after a short illness, age 86, and his funeral services were held at the Park Avenue Synagogue in Manhattan.

== Honors ==
In the US Department of State, Katz has been awarded several awards including the 1953 Commendable Service Award, and the Meritorious Honor Award in 1963.

In 1998, he received the USCIB International Leadership Award, as well as the Ordre national du Mérite.

== See also ==
- List of ambassadors of the United States to the Organisation for Economic Co-operation and Development
- List of Harvard University politicians
