= Karen Kornbluh =

American government official

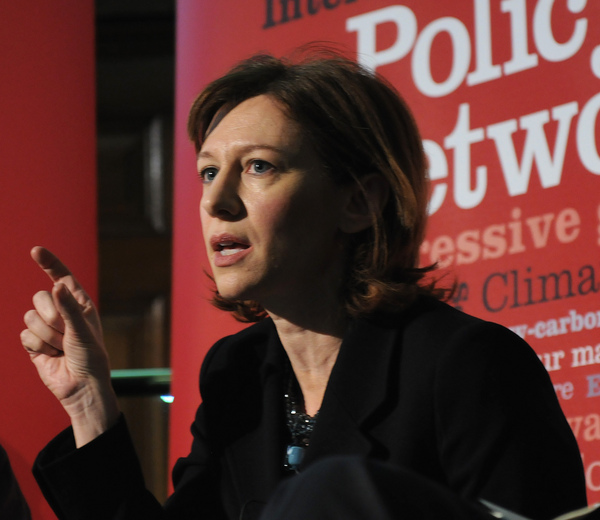

Member of the Broadcasting Board of Governors
- Incumbent
- Assumed office December 16, 2014
- President: Barack Obama; Donald Trump
- Preceded by: Michael P. Meehan

United States Ambassador to the Organisation for Economic Co-operation and Development
- In office August 12, 2009 – June 23, 2012
- President: Barack Obama
- Preceded by: Christopher Egan
- Succeeded by: Daniel Yohannes

Personal details
- Born: 1963 (age 62–63)
- Party: Democratic
- Education: Bryn Mawr College (BA); Harvard University (MPP)

Karen Kornbluh (born 1963) served as U.S. Ambassador to the OECD under President Barack Obama and as a senior official at the U.S. Department of the Treasury and Federal Communications Commission under President Bill Clinton.

She is an expert on communications policy, international trade and issues affecting working families. Her profile in The New York Times focused on her efforts “Fighting for Economic Equality.” She is now Director of the Digital Innovation and Democracy Initiative at the German Marshall Fund of the United States, a think tank dedicated to promoting transatlantic cooperation, where she is also a Senior Fellow.

She also currently serves as the Chairperson of the board of the Open Technology Fund.

She was previously Executive Vice President of External Affairs at Nielsen, Senior Fellow for Digital Policy at the Council on Foreign Relations, and a presidentially-appointed member of the Broadcasting Board of Governors.

She was a senior adviser to Barack Obama from the beginning of his Senate tenure throughout his 2008 presidential campaign.

== Education ==
Kornbluh attended Hunter College High School, earned a B.A. from Bryn Mawr College and a Master of Public Policy degree from the John F. Kennedy School of Government at Harvard University.

== Career ==
Early in her career, Kornbluh was a Telesis management consultant to Fortune 500 high-technology companies and an economist at Alan Greenspan's economic forecasting firm, Townsend-Greenspan & Co.

She worked for Senator John Kerry (D-MA) on the staff of the Commerce Committee and its Telecommunications Subcommittee.

From 1994 to 1997, she filled several roles at the Federal Communications Commission (FCC), starting in November 1994 as Senior Policy Advisor in the Office of Plans and Policy, working on educational technology and children's television. She next served as Assistant Chief of the Commission's International Bureau, helping to negotiate the World Trade Organization Agreement on Basic Telecommunications and leading negotiations for the first satellite agreement between the United States and Mexico. She became Director of the FCC's Office of Legislative and Intergovernmental Affairs in February 1997, while the agency was implementing key provisions of the Telecommunications Act of 1996. She completed her FCC service as Deputy Chief of the Mass Media Bureau.

In that role, she handled digital television matters as well as a variety of other issues before the Bureau. She went from the FCC to the Department of the Treasury, where she was deputy chief of staff, working on such issues as e-commerce and international trade.

Kornbluh founded the Work and Family Program at the New America Foundation, having joined the think tank as a Markle Fellow. She has argued for a modernized social insurance system that would better meet the needs of "juggler families", which are dependent on the incomes of both parents or that of a single parent. Prominent conservative commentator David Brooks cited Kornbluh's piece on juggler families as one of the notable magazine articles that characterized 2006 as a "year of losing ground", or a time of pronounced anxiety in the United States. Kornbluh has also published articles on economic policy in such periodicals as the Atlantic Monthly, New York Times and The Washington Post.

She was a senior fellow for digital policy at the Council on Foreign Relations.

She was appointed director of the German Marshall Fund's technology program in November 2018, where she has been charged with using the organization’s global, multi-sector network, reputation, and the sum of its substantive expertise to help shape a future in which technology strengthens rather than undermines democratic values. The technology program at GMF will contend with the challenge of online disinformation as well as other technology policy issues including 21st century jobs and innovation, democratic implications of frontier technologies, and cyber dimensions of national security.

Obama hired her as his policy director in 2004—a move that was seen as a sign of his determination to build an unusually strong staff for a freshman Senator. A 2007 New York Sun article mentions Kornbluh as one of several former Clinton Administration officials who joined "the Obama camp", rather than Hillary Rodham Clinton's team, for the 2008 presidential election. She was primary drafter of the 2008 Democratic platform.

As U.S. Ambassador to the OECD, she worked with Secretary of State Clinton to spearhead development of the first global Internet Policymaking Principles, launch the OECD Gender Initiative, and expand anti-corruption efforts of the international economic standards organization.

== Activism ==
In 2015 Kornbluh signed an open letter, coordinated by the ONE Campaign, addressed to Angela Merkel and Nkosazana Dlamini-Zuma, urging them to focus on women as they serve as the head of the G7 in Germany and the AU in South Africa respectively, which will start to set the priorities in development funding before a main UN summit in September 2015 that will establish new development goals for the generation.

== Personal ==
In 1993, Kornbluh married lawyer James J. Halpert, for whom the character Jim Halpert, on the television show The Office, is named. They have two children.

Diplomatic posts
| Preceded by Christopher Egan | United States Ambassador to the Organisation for Economic Co-operation and Development; 2009–2012 | Succeeded by Daniel Yohannes |
