= Amy L. Bondurant =

American diplomat (born 1951)

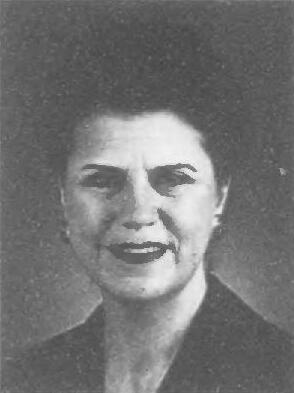

United States Ambassador to the OECD
- In office November 28, 1997 – July 31, 2001
- President: Bill Clinton; George W. Bush
- Preceded by: David Laurence Aaron
- Succeeded by: Jeanne L. Phillips

Personal details
- Born: April 20, 1951 (age 75) Union City, Tennessee
- Party: Democratic
- Spouse: David E. Dunn III
- Education: University of Kentucky (B.A.); Washington College of Law (J.D.)

Amy Laura Bondurant (born April 20, 1951) is an American attorney who served as U.S. Ambassador to the Organization for Economic Cooperation and Development (OECD) from 1997 to 2001. Bondurant was the first woman to represent the United States at the OECD and was also the first woman to serve on the board of Rolls-Royce.

== Early life and education ==
Born in Union City, Tennessee, Bondurant grew up in Hickman, Kentucky. Her father was Judge John C. Bondurant and her mother was Doris Bondurant. Bondurant attended the University of Kentucky, where she received her bachelor's degree in telecommunications in 1973 In 1978, Bondurant received her Juris Doctor degree from Washington College of Law of the American University.

== Career ==
=== Staffing and legal career ===
Bondurant began her career as a legislative assistant for Senator Wendell Ford. As the ranking member of the Senate Commerce Committee, Ford pushed for the nomination of Bondurant to serve on the Federal Trade Commission (FTC) in 1982, though this position went to George W. Douglas instead.

Bondurant later became a partner and board member of the law firm Verner, Liipfert, Bernhard, McPherson and Hand. Bondurant was the first female member of the firm's board of directors and executive committee.

=== Federal government career ===
In 1993, Secretary of Transportation Federico Peña appointed Bondurant to serve as chairwoman of the Commercial Space Transportation Advisory Committee. Bondurant served in this capacity until 1997, when she was appointed by President Bill Clinton as U.S. Representative to the Organization for Economic Cooperation and Development (OECD).

=== Post-government career ===
In 2007, Bondurant endorsed Senator Hillary Clinton's 2008 presidential campaign, alongside over a hundred Clinton Administration alumni. Bondurant remained active in the foreign policy sphere, joining the Council on Foreign Relations and speaking out in support of Clinton's plan to defeat ISIS during the 2016 campaign.

== Personal life ==
Bondurant is married to David E. Dunn III, an attorney with the Washington, D.C.–based firm Squire Patton Boggs LLP. They have one son.
