= Andy Strenio =

Member of the Federal Trade Commission

Commissioner of the Federal Trade Commission
- In office March 17, 1986 – July 15, 1991
- President: Ronald Reagan; George H. W. Bush
- Preceded by: George W. Douglas
- Succeeded by: Dennis Yao

Personal details
- Born: Andrew John Strenio, Jr. April 3, 1952 (age 74) Erie, Pennsylvania
- Party: Democratic
- Education: Princeton University (B.A.); Harvard Law School (J.D.)

Andrew John Strenio, Jr. (born April 3, 1952), known as Andy Strenio, is a retired American attorney and author who served as a member of the Federal Trade Commission (FTC) from 1986 to 1991. A Democrat, he previously served as a member of the Interstate Commerce Commission (ICC), a now-defunct independent federal agency.

As an author, Strenio notably wrote the book The Testing Trap (1981), in which he criticized the role of standardized testing in the American education system. Following his retirement from law in 2020, Strenio announced his intention to return to writing books.

== Early life and career ==
Strenio was born April 3, 1952, in Erie, Pennsylvania. In 1974, Strenio received his bachelor's degree (A.B.) from Princeton University, and in 1978 was awarded his Juris Doctor (J.D.) degree from Harvard Law School.

After working as an attorney at law firm Wald, Harkrader & Ross, Strenio joined the White House Council of Economic Advisers, where he served under Presidents Jimmy Carter and Ronald Reagan. Between 1982 and 1984, Strenio was a staffer at the Federal Trade Commission (FTC), where he served as Assistant Director for Regulatory Evaluation in the Bureau of Consumer Protection.

In 1981, Strenio's book The Testing Trap was published, where he criticized the role of standardized testing in the American education system. The book was praised in a review in The Washington Post, which stated

"[Strenio] does an absolutely first-rate job of marshalling his facts and anecdotes into compelling arguments. His anaylsis [sic] is clean, his sources extensive and there is just the right spice of outrage added to get you worked up."

== Career in federal agencies ==
=== Interstate Commerce Commission (ICC) ===
From 1984 to 1985, Strenio served as a member of the Interstate Commerce Commission (ICC), a now-defunct independent agency. During Strenio's time on the ICC, the agency's budget struggled to stay within the confines of the 1985 fiscal year, leading to the agency's more-than-900 employees to take a day off of work each week. Though ICC commissioners were barred from doing the same, Strenio chose to voluntarily give up 20% of his pay until the issue was resolved. Strenio's term on the ICC expired January 1, 1986 as a result of a congressional mandate to reduce the number of seats in the agency.

=== Federal Trade Commission (FTC) ===
Following the resignation of George W. Douglas, Strenio was nominated in 1986 to serve as a member of the Federal Trade Commission (FTC). Strenio served on the body until 1991, when he resigned to join law firm Fox, Bennett, and Turner as a partner. He was succeeded in his position by Dennis Yao, a Wharton professor and fellow Democrat.

As a member of the FTC, Strenio argued that budget cuts hindered the ability of the agency to carry out its duties. Strenio argued that the FTC is now "a gaunt and bloodied agency" as a result of budgetary constraints, noting that in 1988 that:

"Since fiscal year 1980, there has been a drop of more than 40 percent in the work years allocated to antitrust enforcement. In the same period, merger filings skyrocketed to more than 320 percent of their fiscal 1980 level."

== Post-government career ==
In 1998, Strenio joined the antitrust practice at Powell Goldstein. After three years, he resigned to join Sidley Austin, corporate law firm. In 2011, he helped secure the release of Óscar Elías Biscet, a Cuban political prisoner, which he later described as one of the proudest moments of his career:

“[Biscet] had been tortured by [Fidel] Castro's thugs because he had the temerity to engage in peaceful non-violent protest activities in support of human rights,... He had been languishing in jail. That was a great moment for all of us on that effort when he was released. That is one thing that really stands out in my memory.”

During the United States v. Microsoft Corp. lawsuit, Strenio argued that it would be in both parties' interest to reach a settlement out of court in order to avoid a case outcome imposed by the judiciary. Strenio retired from practicing law in 2020, and announced his intention to go back into book-writing almost four decades after the release of The Testing Trap in 1981.
