= Christopher F. Egan =

American businessman and diplomat

Christopher Fitzgerald Egan
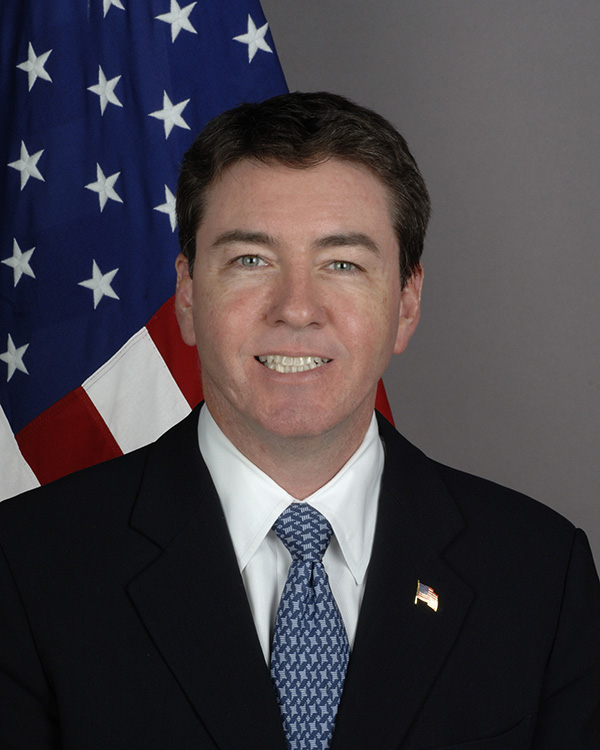

15th United States Ambassador to the Organisation for Economic Co-operation and Development
- In office October 2007 – January 2009
- President: George W. Bush
- Preceded by: Connie Morella
- Succeeded by: Karen Kornbluh

Personal details
- Born: Boston, Massachusetts
- Party: Republican
- Education: Xaverian Brothers High School; University of Massachusetts Amherst, BSEE; Harvard University, MPA

Christopher Fitzgerald Egan is an American businessman, fundraiser, diplomat and philanthropist. Egan served as United States Ambassador to the Organisation for Economic Co-operation and Development (OECD) in Paris, France from October 2007 to November 2009. He was appointed by President George W. Bush and was confirmed by the U.S. Senate on October 26, 2007.

== Biography ==
=== Early life ===
Egan was born in Boston, Massachusetts to Maureen and Richard Egan, the co-founder of the EMC Corporation. He graduated from Xaverian Brothers High School in Westwood, Massachusetts in 1982. He then received a bachelor of science in electrical engineering from the University of Massachusetts Amherst in 1986 and a master of public administration with a concentration in leadership from the John F. Kennedy School of Government at Harvard University.

=== Career ===
Egan is the President and a founding member of Carruth Capital, LLC, based in Westborough, Massachusetts. Carruth Capital, founded in 1994, is one of New England's top 10 commercial real estate investment and development firms.

In 2004, Egan produced a critically acclaimed documentary entitled, Eclipsed by the Sun: The Political Education of John Kerry, a documentary about John Kerry's unsuccessful 1972 campaign for the Massachusetts' 5th Congressional district. Egan was a Bush Ranger following his significant fundraising for the George W. Bush presidential campaign, 2004 and the John McCain presidential campaign, 2008.

From October 2007 to January 2009, Egan served as ambassador to the Paris-based Organisation for Economic Co-operation and Development (OECD). He was appointed by President George W. Bush and was confirmed by the U.S. Senate on October 26, 2007. According to Egan, he was tasked with reducing the U.S. investment in the organization while making sure other countries paid more of the budget. According to Egan, "I had to convince 29 other countries that they should pay more" and that he succeeded for the first time in history to reduce the U.S. contribution to an international organization at the same time that its budget went up.

On March 18, 2015, Egan became the Chairman of the Board of Directors for The Home for Little Wanderers, the nation's oldest and one of New England's largest child and family service agencies. In addition, Egan and his wife, Jean, founded and direct "Break the Cycle of Poverty," a non-profit foundation dedicated to lifting families out of poverty through education. The foundation works to teach economically challenged individuals and families the skills needed to break free of poverty. He is also a trustee of the Egan Family Foundation.

=== Personal ===
Egan and his wife, Jean, have five children (Mary Catherine, Christopher, Michael, Thomas, and John) and now live in Boston, Massachusetts after living in Paris, France for about two years.

Diplomatic posts
Preceded by Connie Morella	United States Ambassador to the Organisation for Economic Co-operation and Development; October 2007 – January 2009	Succeeded by Karen Kornbluh
