= Jeanne L. Phillips =

American businesswoman and diplomat

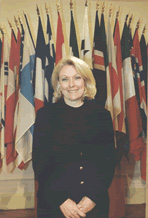

13th United States Ambassador to the Organisation for Economic Co-operation and Development
- In office August 7, 2001 – June 2, 2003
- President: George W. Bush
- Preceded by: Amy L. Bondurant
- Succeeded by: Connie Morella

Personal details
- Born: Arkansas
- Party: Republican
- Education: Southern Methodist University

Jeanne Linden Phillips (born 1954) is an American businesswoman and diplomat. She served as United States Ambassador to the Organisation for Economic Co-operation and Development from 2001 to 2003, under President George W. Bush.

== Biography ==
=== Early life ===
Phillips was born in Arkansas. She graduated in 1976 from Southern Methodist University in Dallas, Texas.

=== Career ===
Phillips served as president and chief executive officer of the consulting firm, Jeanne Johnson & Company, Inc, and as managing director of the Dallas office of Public Strategies, Inc. She served as fundraising advisor to the Woodrow Wilson International Center for Scholars in Washington, D.C., the University of Texas MD Anderson Cancer Center in Houston, Texas, her alma mater, SMU, George H. W. Bush, etc.

During George W. Bush's first presidential campaign, she served as Senior Advisor for National Finance in collaboration with the chairman of the Campaign Finance Committee. Phillips then served as deputy chairman for operations at the Republican National Committee in Washington, D.C. In 2001, she was executive director of the 54th Presidential Inaugural Committee. From 2001 to 2005, she served as United States Ambassador to the Organisation for Economic Co-operation and Development in Paris, France. In 2005, she was the chair of the 55th Presidential Inaugural Committee for President Bush's reelection.

Phillips is currently senior vice president of corporate affairs and international relations at the Hunt Refining Company, Hunt Consolidated and the Hunt Oil Company. She is a member of the American Petroleum Institute.

She serves on the board of directors of the John Goodwin Tower Center for Political Studies at SMU, the Baylor Health Care System Foundation, the Hockaday School, American Hospital of Paris Foundation and the George W. Bush Presidential Center. Phillips is a member of the Dallas Assembly, the Dallas Woman's Club and the Philosophical Society of Texas.

=== Personal life ===
Phillips resides in Dallas, Texas, where she attends St. Michael and All Angels Episcopal Church.
