= Chloe Aaron =

American television executive (1938–2020)

Chloe Wellingham Aaron
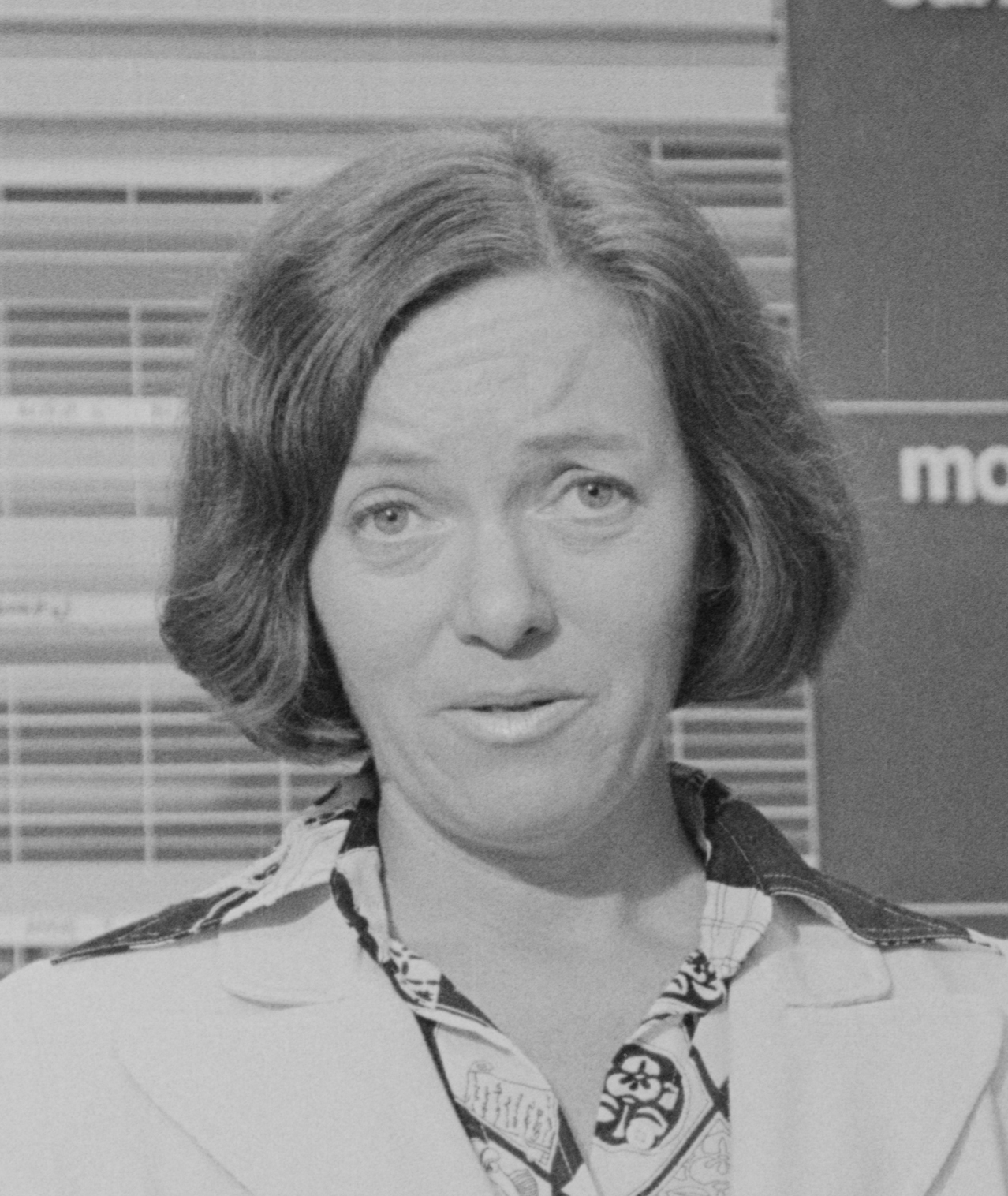
- Aaron in 1977
- Born: Chloe Wellingham; October 9, 1938; Santa Monica, California, U.S.
- Died: February 29, 2020 (aged 81)
- Education: Occidental College; George Washington University
- Occupation: American television executive

Chloe Wellingham Aaron (née Wellingham; October 9, 1938 – February 29, 2020) was an American television executive, best known for her work at the Public Broadcasting Service.

== Early and personal life ==
Chloe Wellingham was born on October 9, 1938, in Santa Monica, California.

In 1961, Wellingham graduated from Occidental College in Los Angeles. In 1962, she graduated from George Washington University in Washington, D.C., with a master's degree in American studies.

In 1962, Wellingham married David L. Aaron, an American diplomat who has held several government positions, including Deputy National Security Advisor to President Jimmy Carter.

Aaron died at her home on February 29, 2020, caused by cancer and chronic obstructive pulmonary disease.

== Career ==
Prior to joining the National Endowment for the Arts, Aaron worked as a freelance writer.

In 1970, Aaron became the founding director of the Public Media Program at the National Endowment for the Arts. There, she coordinated programs and grants for independent filmmakers and minority artists.

From 1976 to 1980, Aaron was senior vice president for programming of the Public Broadcasting Service. There, she introduced a system for satellite distribution to PBS member stations, established a schedule for PBS stations to broadcast national programs concurrently, and expanded broadcasts. Aaron promoted and expanded programs including PBS NewsHour, Nova, American Playhouse, documentaries, and live opera performances such as those of the Metropolitan Opera. According to The Wall Street Journal, Aaron "helped give the public television network a national identity" and was the "most influential woman in television in the late 1970s."

In the 1980s, Aaron worked as an independent consultant and film producer. In 1989 and 1990, Aaron was vice president of WNYC-TV in New York. In the 1990s, Aaron lived in Europe while her husband David L. Aaron served as ambassador to the Organisation for Economic Co-operation and Development. There, she produced a news show for Italian television.

Aaron also established an initiative to preserve classic films and historically important television programs at the Library of Congress in Washington, D.C., and at the Museum of Modern Art in New York City.
