= Connie Morella =

American politician (born 1931)

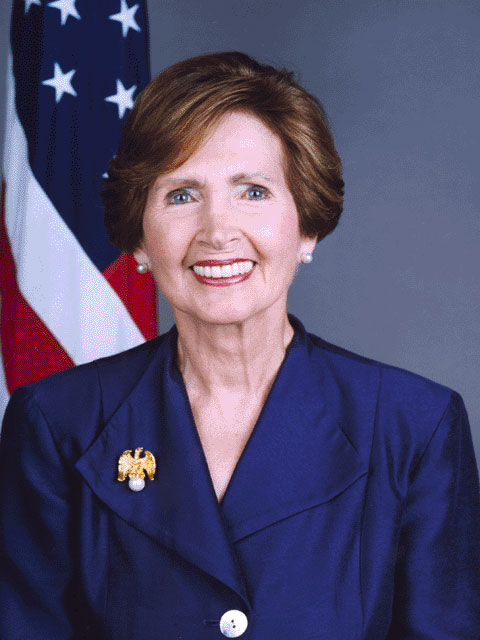
- Official portrait, c. 2003–2007

United States Ambassador to the Organisation for Economic Co-operation and Development
- In office August 1, 2003 – August 6, 2007
- President: George W. Bush
- Preceded by: Jeanne Phillips
- Succeeded by: Christopher Egan

Member of the U.S. House of Representatives from Maryland's 8th district
- In office January 3, 1987 – January 3, 2003
- Preceded by: Michael Barnes
- Succeeded by: Chris Van Hollen

Member of the Maryland House of Delegates from the 16th district
- In office January 10, 1979 – January 3, 1987
- Preceded by: John Ward
- Succeeded by: Brian Frosh; Gilbert Genn

Personal details
- Born: Constance Albanese; February 12, 1931 (age 95) Somerville, Massachusetts, U.S.
- Party: Republican
- Spouse: Anthony Morella (m. 1954; died 2020)
- Education: Boston University (BA); American University (MA)

Constance Morella (/məˈrɛlə/; née Albanese; born February 12, 1931) is an American politician and diplomat. She represented Maryland's 8th congressional district in the United States House of Representatives from 1987 to 2003. She served as Permanent Representative from the U.S. to the Organisation for Economic Co-operation and Development (OECD) from 2003 to 2007. She is on American University's faculty as an Ambassador in Residence for the Women & Politics Institute. She was appointed to the American Battle Monuments Commission (ABMC) by President Barack Obama in 2010.

== Early life ==
Morella was born Constance Albanese in Somerville, Massachusetts. After graduating from Somerville High School in 1948, she attended Boston University, where she earned an Associate of Arts in 1950 and a Bachelor of Arts in 1954. Morella became a secondary school teacher in Montgomery County Public Schools in Maryland from 1957 to 1961. She graduated from American University with an M.A. in 1967 and was an instructor there from 1968 to 1970, when she became a professor at Montgomery College in Rockville, Maryland. She continued to teach until 1985, when she left to fully focus on her political career.

== Political career ==
In 1971 Morella was appointed as a founding member to the Montgomery County Commission for Women, an advisory women's advocacy body, and she was elected its president in 1973. In 1974, she ran for the Maryland House of Delegates from the 16th District (Bethesda), but did not win. She ran again in 1978, winning the seat and receiving more votes than the three previous incumbents. She was reelected for an additional term, before running for United States Congress.

=== Congressional career ===
In 1986, Morella ran for the open Congressional seat in Maryland's 8th congressional district. The district was being vacated by Democrat Michael Barnes, who was running for the Democratic nomination for the U.S. Senate. Morella's opponent in the general election was State Senator Stewart Bainum, a multimillionaire business. Morella won endorsements from The Baltimore Sun and The Washington Post. She was the first woman to hold this seat. Although she was a Republican in an area that had become heavily Democratic, she won re-election seven times, serving until 2002.

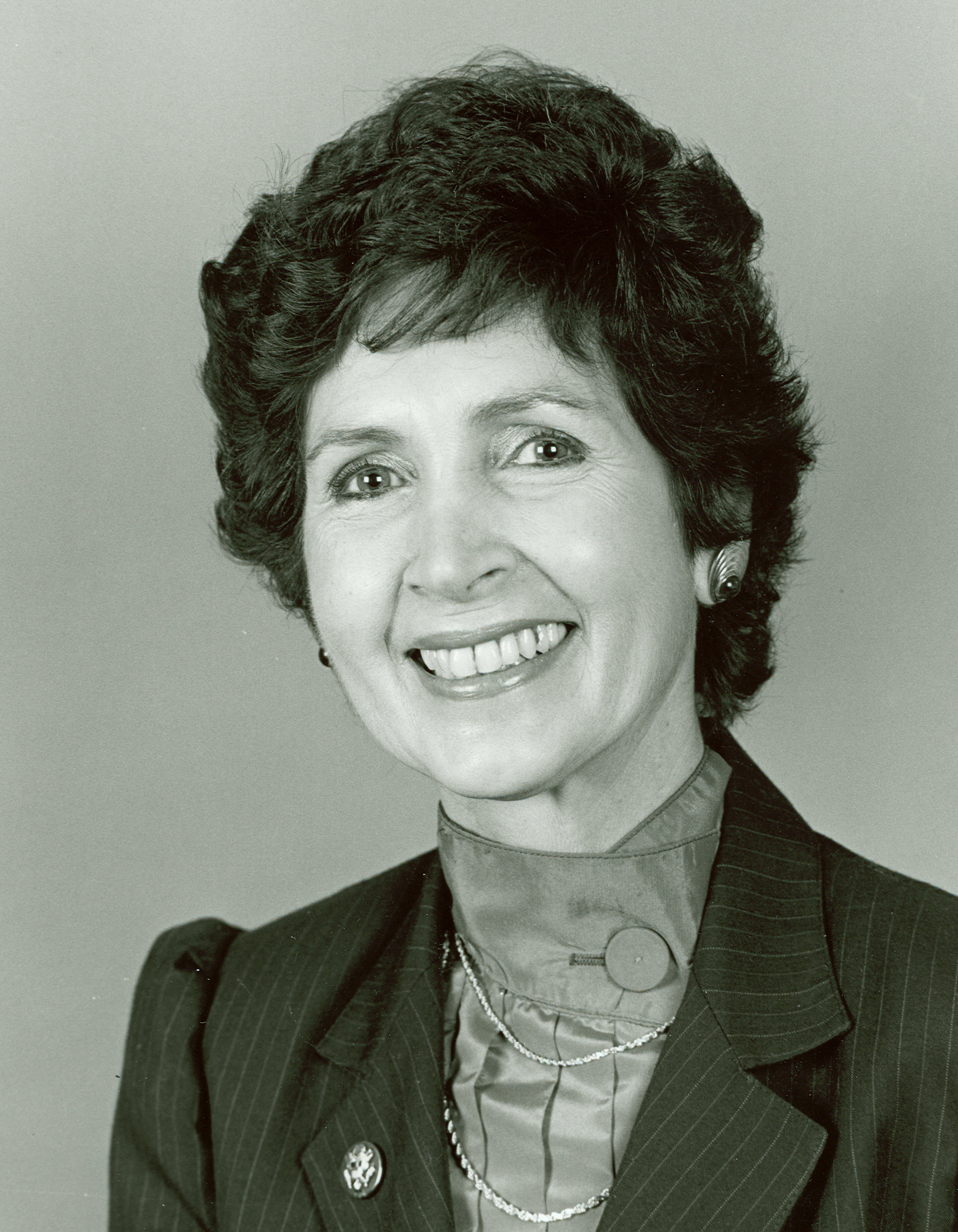
Congresswoman Connie Morella

Morella opposes her party's positions on abortion, gun control, gay rights, and the environmental movement, voted for government funding of contraceptives and needle exchange programs for drug addicts, and favored the legalization of medical marijuana. She received some support from organized labor and opposed many tax cuts. Morella, however, voted against President Clinton's 1993 budget, as all other Congressional Republicans did. She voted against declaring English the official language of the United States and, in 1996, against a bill approved by Congress and signed by President Bill Clinton to combat illegal immigration.

In 1996, Morella was one of only five Republicans to vote against the Cuban Liberty and Democratic Solidarity Act. In 1998, she was one of only three Republicans to vote against renaming the Washington National Airport the Ronald Reagan Washington National Airport. Morella was the only Republican in the entire Congress to have voted against approving the use of military force in Iraq in 1991 and again in 2002. She was active in human rights, women's health, and domestic violence issues in Congress, and served on the Science and Government Reform Committees.

Morella was U.S. representative to the 1994 U.N. International Conference on Population and Development in Cairo and co-chair of the Congressional delegation to the 1995 U.N. Fourth World Conference on Women in Beijing. Among the legislation she sponsored were the 1992 Battered Women's Testimony Act, which provided funds for indigent women to hire expert testimony in domestic abuse cases, and the Judicial Training Act, which funded programs to educate judges about domestic violence, especially in child custody cases.

Although she signed the Contract with America developed by Newt Gingrich, she had a mixed record supporting the subsequent Republican majority in Congress. She did not openly challenge the new House leadership until 1997 when she voted "present" for Speaker of the House instead of for the incumbent, Newt Gingrich. In 1998, she was one of four Republicans, along with Amo Houghton and Peter T. King of New York and Chris Shays of Connecticut, to oppose all four articles of impeachment against Clinton during the Lewinsky scandal.

==== Committee assignments ====
For the 107th Congress:

- Committee on Government Reform
  - Subcommittee on Civil Service and Agency Organization
  - Subcommittee on District of Columbia (Chair)
- Committee on Science
  - Subcommittee on Environment, Technology, and Standards

=== Electoral challenges ===
Maryland Senate President Thomas V. "Mike" Miller stated that he intended to draw Morella's district out from under her after her relatively narrow reelection in 2000. The Democrats controlled both the State Legislature and the Governor's Office in 2000, thus controlling the redistricting for the 2000 Census. Staffers from Miller, House Speaker Cas Taylor, and Governor Parris Glendening drew new maps to gerrymander out Morella and fellow moderate Republican Bob Ehrlich.

The final redistricting plan restored a heavily Democratic spur of eastern Montgomery County removed in the 1990 redistricting and added nine precincts in Prince George's County from Al Wynn's heavily Democratic 4th district. Although it forced Van Hollen and Shriver to run against each other in an expensive primary, Van Hollen defeated Morella in 2002 with 52 percent of the vote to Morella's 47 percent (Morella would have narrowly won re-election in her previous district, according to election returns).

In 2013, Morella signed an amicus curiae brief submitted to the Supreme Court in support of same-sex marriage during the Hollingsworth v. Perry case. On August 24, 2020, Morella was one of 24 former Republican lawmakers to endorse Democratic nominee Joe Biden on the opening day of the Democratic National Convention.

=== Ambassador to the OECD ===
President George W. Bush appointed her United States Permanent Representative to the Organisation for Economic Co-operation and Development (OECD) on July 11, 2003. She was unanimously confirmed by the United States Senate on July 31 and sworn in on October 8 of that year, becoming the first former member of Congress to serve as ambassador to the OECD. She is an honorary board member of the National Organization of Italian American Women who declared Morella a Feminina Excelente. She officially served as Ambassador from August 1, 2003 to August 6, 2007. In November 2007, she was succeeded by Christopher Egan, son of Richard Egan.

== Awards and honors ==
Morella has received honorary doctorates from American University, 1988; Norwich University, 1989; Dickinson College, 1989; Mt. Vernon College, 1995; University of Maryland University College, 1996; University of Maryland, 1997; Uniformed Services University of the Health Sciences, 1997; Elizabethtown College, 1999; Washington College, 2000; and National Labor College, 2004. Her awards and recognitions include induction into the Maryland Women's Hall of Fame, the Ron Brown Standards Leadership Award, and public service awards from the American Medical Association, the American Bar Association, and the Hubert H. Humphrey Civil Rights Award from the Leadership Conference on Civil Rights "for selfless and devoted service in the cause of equality." The Republic of Italy awarded her the Medal of the Legion of Merit. She received the Foremother Award by The National Center for Health Research in 2008.

In 2013, she was awarded the Knight Commander's Cross of the Order of Merit of the Federal Republic of Germany for putting "energy and enthusiasm into growing the Congressional Study Group on Germany, which is the oldest and most active parliamentary exchange involving Congress and the legislative branch of another country" during her tenure as President of the United States Association of Former Members of Congress. In 2016, she was conferred with Imperial Decorations by the Japanese government. For her contributions to deepen the U.S.-Japan alliance in the U.S. Congress, she was awarded with the Order of the Rising Sun, Gold and Silver Star. On April 14, 2018, the Bethesda Library branch of the Montgomery County Public Libraries system was renamed the Connie Morella Library.

== Electoral history ==
Maryland's 8th congressional district: Results 1986–2002
Year	Democrat	Votes	Pct	Republican	Votes	Pct	3rd Party	Party	Votes	Pct	
1986	Stewart Bainum, Jr.	82,825	47%	Constance A. Morella	92,917	53%					
1988	Peter Franchot	102,478	37%	Constance A. Morella	172,619	63%					
1990	James Walker, Jr.	39,343	17%	Constance A. Morella	180,059	79%	Sidney Altman	Independent	7,485	3%	
1992	Edward J. Heffernan	77,042	27%	Constance A. Morella	203,377	73%					
1994	Steven Van Grack	60,660	30%	Constance A. Morella	143,449	70%					
1996	Donald Mooers	96,229	39%	Constance A. Morella	152,538	61%					*
1998	Ralph G. Neas	87,497	40%	Constance A. Morella	133,145	60%					
2000	Terry Lierman	136,840	46%	Constance A. Morella	156,241	52%	Brian D. Saunders	Constitution	7,017	2%	*
2002	Chris Van Hollen	112,788	52%	Constance A. Morella	103,587	48%	Stephen Bassett	Unaffiliated	1,599	1%	

*Write-in and minor candidate notes: In 1996, write-ins received 379 votes. In 2000, Lih Young received 77 votes; write-ins received 275 votes; and Scott Walker received 19 votes.

== See also ==
- Victor Kamkin Bookstore – a Rockville, Maryland bookstore which Morella sought to save from bankruptcy
- Women in the United States House of Representatives

U.S. House of Representatives
Preceded by Michael Barnes	Member of the U.S. House of Representatives from Maryland's 8th congressional district 1987–2003	Succeeded by Chris Van Hollen
Preceded by Pat Schroeder	Chair of the Congressional Women's Caucus; 1995–1997	Succeeded by Nancy Johnson
Diplomatic posts
Preceded by Jeanne Phillips	United States Ambassador to the Organisation for Economic Co-operation and Development; 2003–2005	Succeeded by Christopher Egan
U.S. order of precedence (ceremonial)
Preceded by Barbara B. Kennelly as Former U.S. Representative	Order of precedence of the United States as Former U.S. Representative	Succeeded by Randy Forbes as Former U.S. Representative
