= 2000 United States House of Representatives elections in Maryland =

- November 7, 2000

All 8 Maryland seats to the United States House of Representatives
| | Majority party | Minority party |
|---|---|---|
| Party | Democratic | Republican |
| Seats before | 4 | 4 |
| Seats won | 4 | 4 |
| Seat change | Steady | Steady |
| Popular vote | 1,060,934 | 856,306 |
| Percentage | 55.06% | 44.44% |
| Swing | ▲0.54% | ▼1.04% |

Democratic
50–60%
60–70%
70–80%
80–90%
Republican
50–60%
60–70%
70–80%

The 2000 congressional elections in Maryland were held on November 7, 2000, to determine the persons representing the state of Maryland in the United States House of Representatives. Maryland held eight seats in the House, apportioned according to the 1990 United States census. Representatives were elected for two-year terms; those elected in 2000 served in the 107th Congress from January 3, 2001, until January 3, 2003.

As of 2021, this is the last time that Maryland's delegation to the United States House of Representatives was tied, or that Republicans have even won more two seats.

== Overview ==
United States House of Representatives elections in Maryland, 2000
| Party | Seats | Gains | Losses | Net gain/loss | Seats % | Votes % | Votes | +/− |
|---|---|---|---|---|---|---|---|---|
| Democratic | 4 | 0 | 0 | 0 | 50% | 55.06% | 1,060,934 | +0.54% |
| Republican | 4 | 0 | 0 | 0 | 50% | 44.44% | 856,306 | -1.04% |
| Constitution | 0 | 0 | 0 | 0 | — | 0.36% | 7,017 | +0.36% |
| Libertarian | 0 | 0 | 0 | 0 | — | 0.01% | 238 | +0.01% |
| Green | 0 | 0 | 0 | 0 | — | 0.01% | 155 | +0.01% |
| Other parties | 0 | 0 | 0 | 0 | — | 0.11% | 2,114 | +0.11% |
| Totals | 8 | 0 | 0 | — | 100% | 100% | 1,926,764 | |

== District 1 ==
2000 Maryland's 1st congressional district election
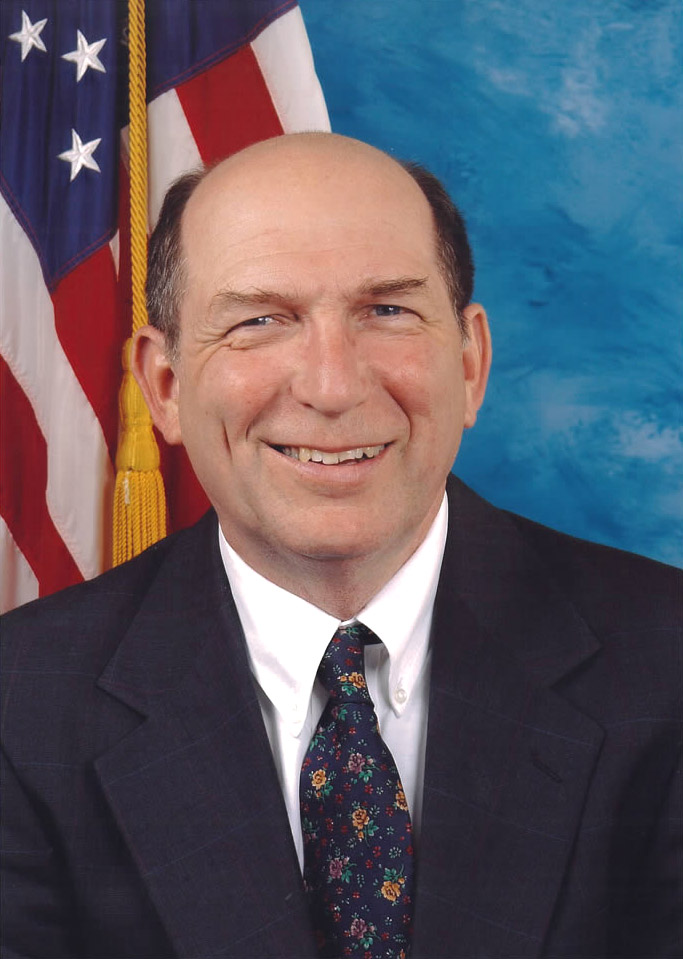

| Nominee | Wayne Gilchrest | Bennett Bozman |
| Party | Republican | Democratic |
| Popular vote | 165,293 | 91,022 |
| Percentage | 64.4% | 35.5% |
U.S. Representative before election
Wayne Gilchrest
Republican
Elected U.S. Representative
Wayne Gilchrest
Republican

2000 Maryland's 1st congressional district election
| Party | Candidate | Votes | % | ±% |
|---|---|---|---|---|
| Republican | Wayne Gilchrest (inc.) | 165,293 | 64.40 | ▼4.79 |
| Democratic | Bennett Bozman | 91,022 | 35.46 | ▲4.65 |
| Write-in | | 367 | 0.14 | |
| Total votes | | 256,682 | 100.00 | |
| Republican hold | | | | |

== District 2 ==
2000 Maryland's 2nd congressional district election

| Nominee | Bob Ehrlich | Kenneth Bosley |
| Party | Republican | Democratic |
| Popular vote | 178,556 | 81,591 |
| Percentage | 68.6% | 31.3% |
U.S. Representative before election
Robert Ehrlich
Republican
Elected U.S. Representative
Robert Ehrlich
Republican

2000 Maryland's 2nd congressional district election
| Party | Candidate | Votes | % | ±% |
|---|---|---|---|---|
| Republican | Robert Ehrlich (inc.) | 178,556 | 68.56 | ▼0.72 |
| Democratic | Kenneth Bosley | 81,591 | 31.33 | ▲0.66 |
| Write-in | | 285 | 0.11 | |
| Total votes | | 260,432 | 100.00 | |
| Republican hold | | | | |

== District 3 ==
2000 Maryland's 3rd congressional district election
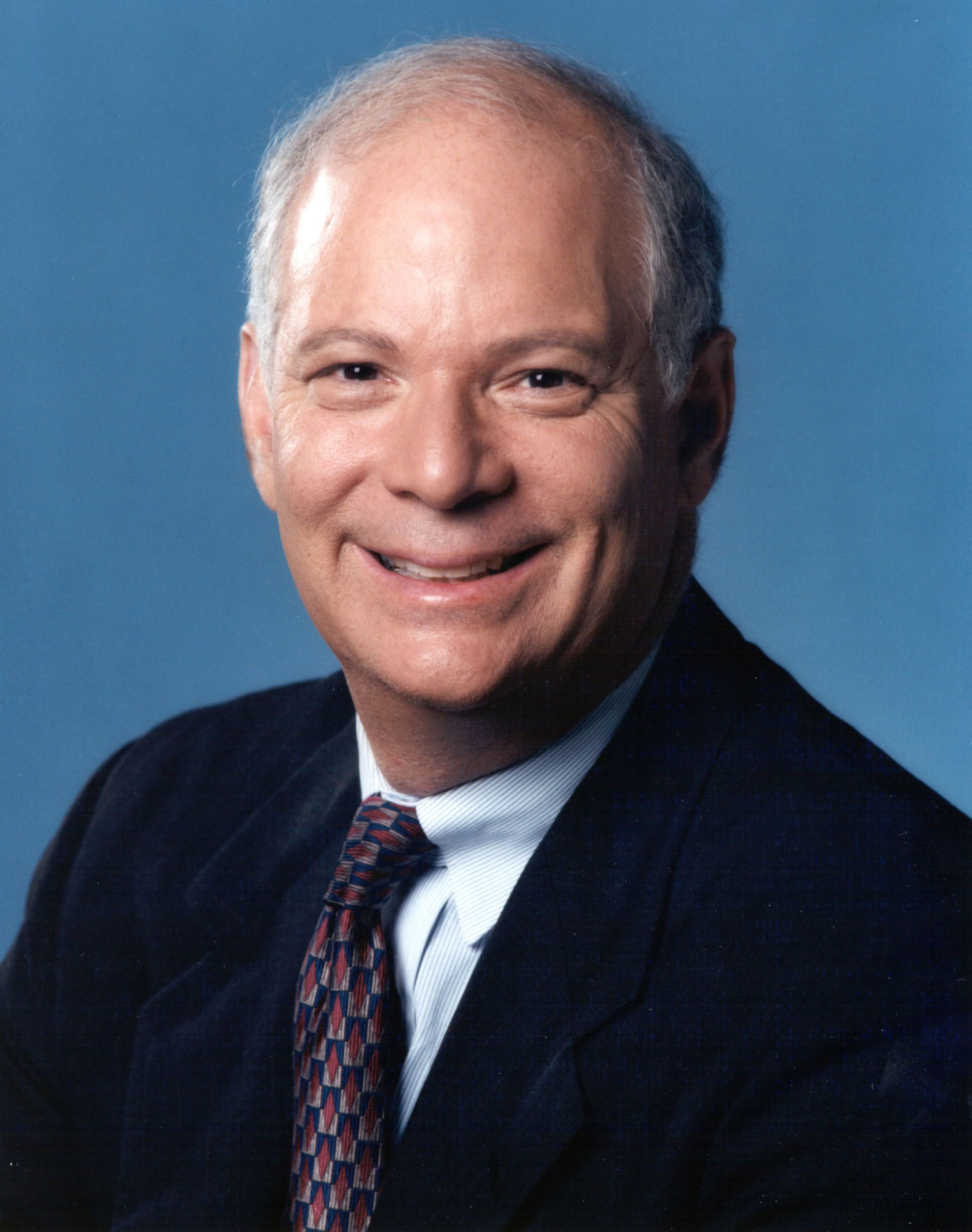

| Nominee | Ben Cardin | Colin Harby |
| Party | Democratic | Republican |
| Popular vote | 169,347 | 53,827 |
| Percentage | 75.7% | 24.1% |
U.S. Representative before election
Benjamin Cardin
Democratic
Elected U.S. Representative
Benjamin Cardin
Democratic

2000 Maryland's 3rd congressional district election
| Party | Candidate | Votes | % | ±% |
|---|---|---|---|---|
| Democratic | Benjamin Cardin (inc.) | 169,347 | 75.66 | ▼1.95 |
| Republican | Colin Harby | 53,827 | 24.05 | ▲1.66 |
| Write-in | | 644 | 0.29 | |
| Total votes | | 223,818 | 100.00 | |
| Democratic hold | | | | |

== District 4 ==
2000 Maryland's 4th congressional district election

| Nominee | Albert Wynn | John Kimble |
| Party | Democratic | Republican |
| Popular vote | 172,624 | 24,973 |
| Percentage | 87.2% | 12.6% |
U.S. Representative before election
Albert Wynn
Democratic
Elected U.S. Representative
Albert Wynn
Democratic

2000 Maryland's 4th congressional district election
| Party | Candidate | Votes | % | ±% |
|---|---|---|---|---|
| Democratic | Albert Wynn (inc.) | 172,624 | 87.20 | ▲1.48 |
| Republican | John Kimble | 24,973 | 12.61 | ▼1.67 |
| Write-in | | 372 | 0.19 | |
| Total votes | | 197,969 | 100.00 | |
| Democratic hold | | | | |

== District 5 ==
2000 Maryland's 5th congressional district election

| Nominee | Steny Hoyer | Thomas E. Hutchins |
| Party | Democratic | Republican |
| Popular vote | 166,231 | 89,019 |
| Percentage | 65.1% | 34.9% |
U.S. Representative before election
Steny Hoyer
Democratic
Elected U.S. Representative
Steny Hoyer
Democratic

2000 Maryland's 5th congressional district election
| Party | Candidate | Votes | % | ±% |
|---|---|---|---|---|
| Democratic | Steny Hoyer (inc.) | 166,231 | 65.09 | ▼0.28 |
| Republican | Thomas E. Hutchins | 89,019 | 34.86 | ▲0.23 |
| Write-in | | 125 | 0.05 | |
| Total votes | | 255,375 | 100.00 | |
| Democratic hold | | | | |

== District 6 ==
2000 Maryland's 6th congressional district election
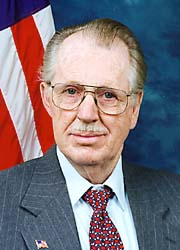

| Nominee | Roscoe Bartlett | Donald DeArmon |
| Party | Republican | Democratic |
| Popular vote | 168,624 | 109,136 |
| Percentage | 60.6% | 39.3% |
U.S. Representative before election
Roscoe Bartlett
Republican
Elected U.S. Representative
Roscoe Bartlett
Republican

2000 Maryland's 6th congressional district election
| Party | Candidate | Votes | % | ±% |
|---|---|---|---|---|
| Republican | Roscoe Bartlett (inc.) | 168,624 | 60.65 | ▼2.77 |
| Democratic | Donald DeArmon | 109,136 | 39.25 | ▲2.67 |
| Write-in | | 285 | 0.10 | |
| Total votes | | 278,045 | 100.00 | |
| Republican hold | | | | |

== District 7 ==
2000 Maryland's 7th congressional district election

| Nominee | Elijah Cummings | Kenneth Kondner |
| Party | Democratic | Republican |
| Popular vote | 134,066 | 19,773 |
| Percentage | 87.1% | 12.8% |
U.S. Representative before election
Elijah Cummings
Democratic
Elected U.S. Representative
Elijah Cummings
Democratic

2000 Maryland's 7th congressional district election
| Party | Candidate | Votes | % | ±% |
|---|---|---|---|---|
| Democratic | Elijah Cummings (inc.) | 134,066 | 87.07 | ▲1.33 |
| Republican | Kenneth Kondner | 19,773 | 12.84 | ▼1.42 |
| Write-in | | 135 | 0.09 | |
| Total votes | | 153,974 | 100.00 | |
| Democratic hold | | | | |

== District 8 ==
2000 Maryland's 8th congressional district election
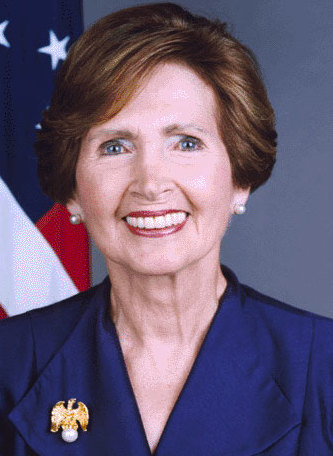

| Nominee | Constance Morella | Terry Lierman |
| Party | Republican | Democratic |
| Popular vote | 156,241 | 136,840 |
| Percentage | 52.0% | 45.5% |
U.S. Representative before election
Constance Morella
Republican
Elected U.S. Representative
Constance Morella
Republican

2000 Maryland's 8th congressional district election
| Party | Candidate | Votes | % | ±% |
|---|---|---|---|---|
| Republican | Constance Morella (inc.) | 156,241 | 52.00 | ▼8.32 |
| Democratic | Terry Lierman | 136,840 | 45.54 | ▲5.90 |
| Constitution | Brian Saunders | 7,017 | 2.34 | New |
| Write-in | | 371 | 0.12 | |
| Total votes | | 300,469 | 100.00 | |
| Republican hold | | | | |
