= United States Council for International Business =

The United States Council for International Business (USCIB) is an independent business advocacy group that was founded in 1945 to promote free trade and help represent U.S. business in the then-new United Nations. One of its primary goals is expanding market access for U.S. products and services abroad. The organization is strongly in favor of open markets and sensible regulation.

== Membership ==
The USCIB has an active membership roster of over 300 multinational companies, law firms and business associations. Membership is on a company basis, and member firms may assign as many individual executives as they like to various policy-focused committees. Committees cover a variety of issues including trade and investment policy, environment and energy, information technology and Internet policy, taxation, and labor and employment. In 2010, Harold McGraw III was elected as Chairman of the USCIB, succeeding William G. Parrett. The current President and CEO of USCIB is Peter Robinson. USCIB has Officers, a Board of Directors, and Trustees who all play an important role in running the organization.

== International affiliations ==
The USCIB is the U.S. affiliate of the International Chamber of Commerce (ICC), the Business and Industry Advisory Committee to the Organization for Economic Co-operation and Development (OECD), and the International Organization of Employers (IOE). It functions as the U.S. representative to the ICC's multifaceted dispute resolution services, including the ICC International Court of Arbitration which is charged with settlement of international business disputes and the legal and procedural aspects of arbitration.

== Functions ==
The USCIB's three function areas are policy advocacy, dispute resolution and ATA Carnet administration.

- The organization promotes business interests both to U.S. policy makers and to international groups like the United Nations. Current, stated policy priorities include advancing sustainable development, expanding international trade and investment, ensuring strong intellectual property rights and supporting information & communication technology (ICT) enabled growth.
- Dispute resolution is accomplished through the USCIB's affiliation with the ICC and its dispute resolution service which includes the ICC International Court of Arbitration. The USCIB provides assistance in the nomination of arbitrators, makes referrals to parties seeking attorneys, organizes seminars and corporate roundtables, and answers questions from U.S. businesses regarding the arbitration process and other ICC dispute resolution services.
- Since 1968, when U.S. Customs assigned them the task, the USCIB has been handling the administration of international customs documents known as ATA Carnets. In this capacity the organization issues and guarantees Carnets, which allow temporary, duty-free imports overseas for goods generally qualified for use in trade shows or as commercial samples and professional equipment. U.S. ATA Carnets can be obtained through appointed service providers as USCIB no longer issues carnets.

== Notable members ==
- Abraham Katz (1926–2013), former president of the Council, diplomat, United States Ambassador to the OECD
