= Herbert Salzman =

American diplomat and businessman

6th United States Ambassador to the Organisation for Economic Co-operation and Development
- In office June 8, 1977 – March 30, 1981
- President: Jimmy Carter; Ronald Reagan
- Preceded by: William C. Turner
- Succeeded by: Abraham Katz

Personal details
- Born: May 2, 1916 New York City, U.S.
- Died: December 23, 1990 (aged 74) New York City, U.S.
- Party: Democratic
- Education: Yale University (B.A.)

Herbert Salzman (May 2, 1916 – December 23, 1990) was an American diplomat and businessman who served as the United States Ambassador to the Organisation for Economic Co-operation and Development (OECD) from 1977 to 1981.

Salzman was born in Brooklyn, New York City to Russian immigrant parents. He attended public schools there and, in 1934, the Hebrew Reali School of Haifa, Palestine. He graduated cum laude from Yale College in 1938, and studied at Columbia University in 1954.

President Lyndon Johnson made him assistant administrator of the United States Agency for International Development (USAID) in 1966.

In 1977, President Jimmy Carter sent him to Paris as the U.S. representative to the OECD, a post he held until 1981. He concurrently served as ambassador to the International Energy Agency (IEA).

Salzman died of leukemia on December 23, 1990, in New York City at age 74.
