= George W. Douglas =

American economist

Commissioner of the Federal Trade Commission
- In office December 27, 1982 – September 18, 1985
- President: Ronald Reagan
- Preceded by: Robert Pitofsky
- Succeeded by: Andrew Strenio

Personal details
- Born: George Warren Douglas; August 10, 1938
- Died: February 10, 2012 (aged 73)
- Party: Democratic
- Education: Yale University (B.A.), (M.A.), (Ph.D)

George Warren Douglas (August 10, 1938 - February 10, 2012) was an American economist who served as a member of the Federal Trade Commission (FTC) from December 27, 1982, until September 18, 1985. Though a member of the Democratic Party, Douglas was widely known as a conservative economist, and was known as a supporter of President Ronald Reagan's economic agenda.

== Early life and career ==
Douglas was born on August 10, 1938, and grew up in Stillwater, Oklahoma. Douglas attended Yale University, where he received his bachelor's degree in 1960, his master's degree in 1963, and his PhD. in 1968. Douglas began his academic career as a lecturer in economics at the University of North Carolina, later being promoted to the position of associate professor. From 1974 to 1975, Douglas was a visiting professor at the University of Texas.

In 1974, Douglas collaborated with James C. Miller III, a fellow future FTC member, on the creation of a theoretical model analyzing the effects of deregulation. Prior to being appointed to the Federal Trade Commission (FTC), Douglas had worked in the federal government as an economist in the office of the Secretary of Transportation.

== Federal Trade Commission (FTC) ==
=== Nomination ===
In 1982, Douglas was nominated by President Ronald Reagan to replace Robert Pitofsky on the Federal Trade Commission (FTC). At the time of his nomination, Douglas was serving as president of Southwest Econometrics, Inc., a private economic research company based in Austin, Texas.

Though Douglas was a Democrat, he was known for his support for conservative economist measures. His nomination was pushed for by Republican FTC member James C. Miller III, a longtime friend and collaborator. According to the Washington Post, Douglas is believed to have voted in the 1980 Republican presidential primary in Texas.

Partially as a result of his closeness to Miller, his nomination was initially opposed by Wendell Ford, a powerful Senate Democrat who served as the party's ranking member on the Senate Commerce Committee. Though Ford favored the nomination of Amy L. Bondurant, Douglas was nevertheless confirmed to the position of FTC Commissioner.

=== Tenure ===
As a member of the FTC, Miller notably wrote the 4-0 decision that dropped the FTC's antitrust case against B.A.T Industries (British American Tobacco), a multinational tobacco company. B.A.T. had been accused of anti-competitive behavior after purchasing Appleton Papers, a fellow tobacco company.

Following Miller's resignation from as FTC Chair in 1985, he was rumored to have supported Douglas as his replacement, though the position ultimately went to Republican FTC member Daniel Oliver. In 1985, Douglas unexpectedly resigned from the FTC, leading Reagan to nominate Democrat Andy Strenio, a member of the Interstate Commerce Commission (ICC), to replace him. Douglaswas the second economist to serve on the FTC, after Miller himself. William Kovacic, who would go on to serve as FTC Chair from 2008 to 2009, credited his time as an attorney-adviser to Douglas during his FTC tenure with helping him understand the agency's functions. Douglas died on February 10, 2012.
