= Denis Lamb =

American career diplomat

Denis Lamb (born September 6, 1937) is an American career diplomat who served as the United States Ambassador to the Organisation for Economic Co-operation and Development from 1987 to 1990.

== Biography ==
Lamb was born on September 6, 1937, in Cleveland, Ohio. He graduated from Columbia University with a B.S. in 1964 and received a M.S. from the Massachusetts Institute of Technology in 1970.

He entered the United States Foreign Service in 1960 and was assigned to Fort-de-France, Martinique as vice consul between 1965 and 1966.

Mr. Lamb then became administrative adviser at the U.S. mission to the Organisation for Economic Co-operation and Development (OECD) in Paris from 1966 to 1969.

After graduating from MIT, Lamb worked was a systems analyst and computer systems manager, then as a science and technology officer, OECD desk officer, and deputy office director of the Political-Economic Office in the Bureau of European Affairs.

He was selected to serve as Executive Assistant to the Deputy Secretary of State Warren Christopher from 1977 to 1978. He became deputy chief of mission at the U.S. mission to the European Communities in Brussels, Belgium, from 1978 to 1982, and then returned to the Department as Deputy Assistant Secretary of Trade and Commercial Affairs, until 1986.

From 1986 to 1987, Lamb was Principal Deputy Assistant Secretary in the Bureau of Economic and Business Affairs in the United States Department of State.

He was appointed by President Ronald Reagan to be Ambassador to OECD on June 15, 1987. His mission ended on June 28, 1990.
