= Edward Streator =

American diplomat (1930–2019)

Edward James Streator (December 12, 1930 – April 16, 2019) was an American diplomat. He was the 1991 winner of the Benjamin Franklin Medal for his work fostering co-operation and collaboration between the United States and the United Kingdom. The Royal Society of Arts called him "a global ‘big thinker’." He was a member of White's.

== Education and early career ==
Streator attended Princeton University, graduating in 1952 with a bachelor's degree. He served four years as a lieutenant in the United States Navy.

Streator served as a career United States Foreign Service officer, starting in 1956, with postings in Addis Ababa (1958–1960), Lomé (1960–1962), Bureau of Intelligence and Research (1962–1964), and as staff assistant to the U.S. Secretary of State (1964–1966). Thereafter, he served at the U.S. Mission to the North Atlantic Treaty Organization (NATO) in Paris. Returning to Washington, he was Director of NATO affairs at the Department of State, and then became Deputy United States Permanent Representative to NATO in Brussels. Afterwards, he became Deputy Chief of Mission in London from 1977-1984. Streator was a member of the Founding Council of the Rothermere American Institute at Oxford University.

== Ambassador to OECD ==
Streator served as the United States ambassador to the Organisation for Economic Co-operation and Development, succeeding Abraham Katz. He was nominated by President Ronald Reagan for that position on July 28, 1984.

== Personal life ==
In 1957, Streator married Priscilla Kenney, the daughter of W. John Kenney, former Under Secretary of the Navy and chief operating officer of the Marshall Plan under President Harry S Truman, at the Cathedral of Saints Peter and Paul, popularly known as the Washington National Cathedral. They had three children, who in 1981 donated to St. John's Church Lafayette Square a stained glass window in his honor. His daughter Elinor had a society wedding in 1986. A lifelong Episcopalian, he served as a member of the vestry to St. John's Episcopal Church.

== In retirement ==
Streator served on several prestigious civic boards after his service as a diplomat. From 1988 - 1993, he was President of the American Chamber of Commerce (U.K.) in London. He also was on the board of overseers of the Whitehead School of Diplomacy and International Relations at Seton Hall University. He was founding chairman of the New Atlantic Initiative, "a network of policy institutes and individuals," which is affiliated with the American Enterprise Institute. He was a member of the Founding Council of the Rothermere American Institute and the University of Oxford.

Among other boards on which he served were: the International Institute for Strategic Studies, the Royal United Services Institute, the European Council of American Chambers of Commerce, the Development Board of the National Gallery of Art in London, the International Foundation of the British Museum of Natural History, and the American Hospital in Paris. He remained President of the Train Foundation in New York that awards an annual prize for civil courage.

After his diplomatic service, Streator retired to Condom, France, where, according to The New York Times, he lived in "a magnificently restored country house a few miles outside town.".

== See also ==
- Lomé Convention
