= William G. Parrett =

American businessman (born 1945)

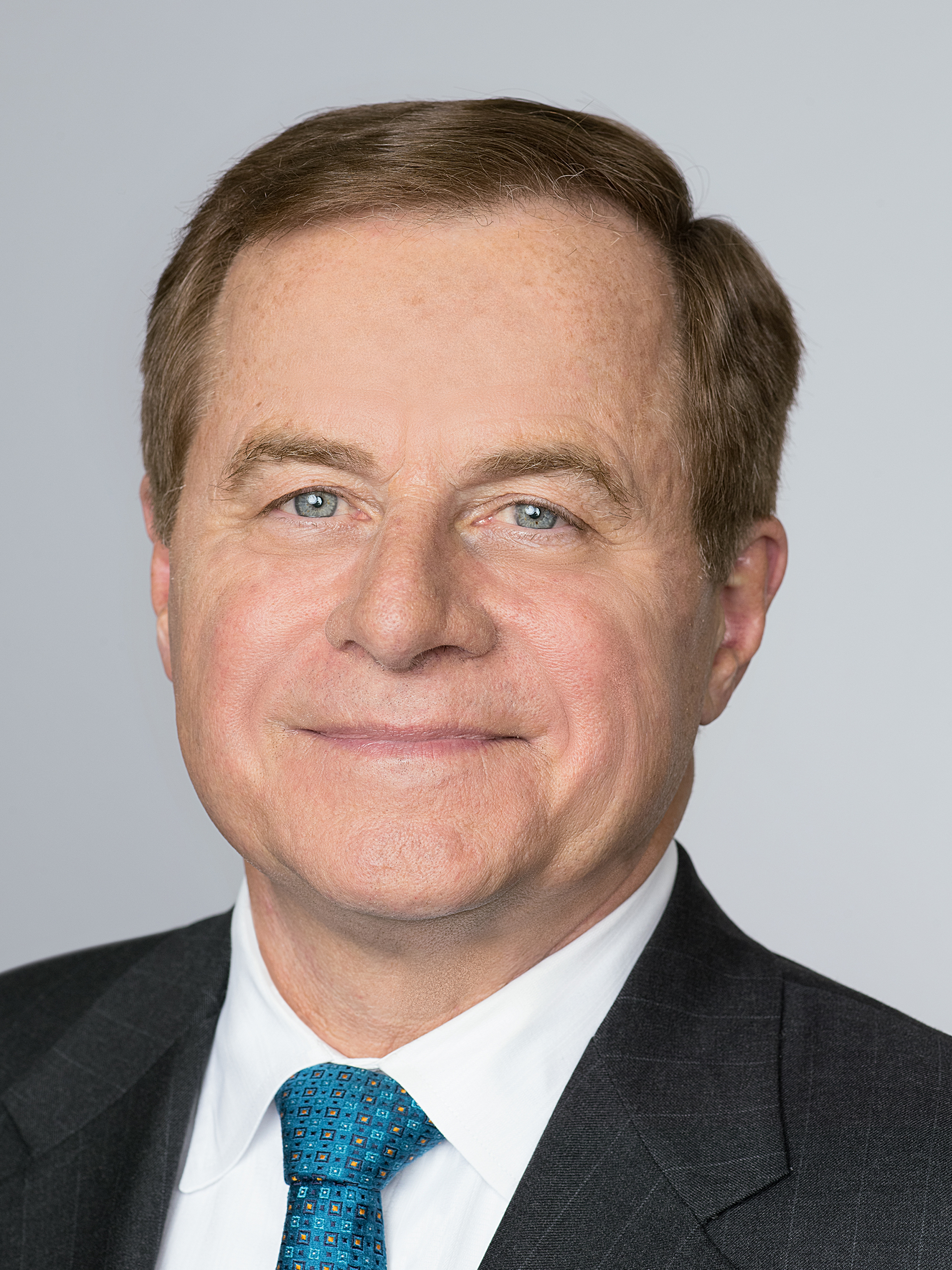
- Born: June 4, 1945 (age 81)
- Education: St. Francis College, New York
- Occupations: Founder of the US National Financial Services Industry Group and the Global Financial Services Industry Group of Deloitte, CPA, management in finance
- Board member of: UBS Americas Holding LLC, Blackstone Group, the Eastman Kodak Company, Thermo Fisher Scientific Inc., IGATE Corporation
- Spouse: Diane Parrett
- Children: 6

William G. Parrett (born June 4, 1945) is an American businessman and senior manager who has served public, private, governmental, and state-owned clients worldwide. In October 2008, Parrett was elected to the board of directors of UBS AG and, in November 2014, to the Board of Directors of UBS Group AG. In May 2018, he stepped down from this role and was focusing on the position of President of UBS Americas Holding LLC.

== Education ==
Parrett graduated with an undergraduate degree (BBA) in accounting from St. Francis College, New York, in 1967. He then became a certified public accountant. In April 2007, he was given an honorary degree of Doctor of Humane Letters by his alma mater.

== Career ==
Parrett was the chairman of the board of the United States Council for International Business from April 2005 through March 2010. Prior to that, Parrett was the CEO of Deloitte Touche Tohmatsu from 2003 until he retired from his position in 2007. He served on Deloitte's Global Executive Committee from 1999 to 2007. In 1997, he also founded the Global Financial Services Industry Group, which he led as chairman. In UBS, Parrett chaired the Audit Committee since 2009, had been a member of the Corporate Culture and Responsibility Committee since 2012 and member of the Compensation Committee since 2015.

His previous positions include a board membership at the International Chamber of Commerce, chairman of the board of the United Way Worldwide and a trustee of the Catholic University of America. He has provided service to many of the Deloitte's leading clients serving as an Advisory or Leadership Partner, among others to General Motors, Merrill Lynch & Co., Abbott Laboratories, Metropolitan Life Insurance Company, Royal Bank of Canada, BASF, Bridgestone Corp., The Charles Schwab Corp., Marsh & McLennan Companies and The Procter & Gamble Company.

=== Other activities and functions ===
- Board member of the Eastman Kodak Company (chairman of the audit committee)
- Board member of the Blackstone Group LP (chairman of the audit committee and chairman of the conflicts committee)
- Board member of Thermo Fisher Scientific Inc. (chairman of the audit committee)
- Member of the Committee on Capital Markets Regulation
- Member of the Carnegie Hall Board of Trustees.

As a member of the boards of Kodak, Blackstone Group, and Thermo Fisher Scientific, he is required to publicly report his interests in those companies, amounting approximately to US$4 million, as of 2016.

== Family ==
Spouse: Diane Parrett

Children: Debra Volpe, Suzie Vallerie, Courtney Balsam, Christie Parrett, Steven Parrett, Gregory Parrett

Grandchildren: Brooke Volpe, Paige Volpe, Steven Parrett Jr, Ellie Volpe, Lila Volpe, Sarah Parrett, Ray Vallerie, Cynthia Parrett, Luke Balsam, Dominic Parrett, Connor Balsam
