= Policy experimentation =

Policy experimentation points to political-administrative procedures and initiatives that allow to discover or test novel instruments of problem-solving and thereby propel broader-based policy innovation or institutional adaptation in a given polity, economy or society.

As compared to centralized legislation or national regulation, one of the major advantages of decentralized policy experimentation is seen in allowing spatially, sectorally or temporally limited policy trials that reduce the risks and costs of introducing major reform schemes to the national polity, economy and society. A major deficit of policy experimentation is seen in promoting policy heterogeneity, legal fragmentation and jurisdictional disparities.

The term has come to renewed prominence in the discussion about the political processes behind China's economic rise since the beginning of the reform and opening up policies in 1978.

== Definition ==
Policy experimentation often just paraphrases the cycles of policy reversals and policy re-prioritization that are characteristic of all political systems if established policies come to be seen as failing, too costly, or politically risky.

In a stricter definition policy experimentation implies a policy process in which experimenting units try out a variety of methods and processes to find imaginative solutions to predefined tasks or to new challenges that emerge during experimental activity. Policy experimentation is not equivalent to freewheeling trial and error or spontaneous policy diffusion. It is a purposeful and coordinated activity geared to producing novel policy options that are injected into official policymaking and then replicated on a larger scale, or even formally incorporated into national law.

In more technical terms, experimentation aims "to inform policy by using experiments with direct interventions and control groups instead of observational studies or theoretical analyses"

== Types of policy experimentation ==
=== Small-scale policy experimentation ===
If policy experimentation is designed and evaluated by social scientists as part of government-sponsored pilot programs, it is usually limited to narrowly defined trial measures and preselected target groups. It often is confined to the fine-tuning of implementation technicalities (such as testing the suitability of a new social security card in a pilot site), but only very rarely to substantive policy formulation (such as the extent, focus, or budgeting of social policies) that are the object of complex bargaining processes in which tactical political considerations weigh much heavier than outside expertise.

=== Broad-based transformative policy experimentation ===
Transformative policy experimentation is much more comprehensive and ambitious since it strives to alter economic and administrative behavior and institutions. Such experimentation also opens up entirely new market segments and establishes new types of corporate organization, thereby regularly moving beyond the originally defined test groups and procedures and involving policymakers on different levels of the political system. Mosteller sees such "reorganization experiments" as the most difficult to carry out because they depend on a chain of complex interrelations, may require a great deal of time and resources, tend to provoke stiff political opposition, have to deal with ongoing contextual changes, and are subject to political-administrative interference and changes of the rules of the game in the middle of the experimental process. Transformative experimentation usually comes in the shape of demonstration projects taking place in a politically realistic—i.e., fluid, disturbed, and contested—context that escapes strict scientific controls, but can give a fuller view of the workings of novel policies and their impact on major social, market, or administrative actors.

=== Implementation prior to legislation ===
Policy experimentation in this variant constitutes a distinct mode of governance that differs in one fundamental way from standard assumptions about policymaking. The conventional model of the policy process that is widely taken for granted by jurists, economists, and political scientists holds that policy analysis, formulation, and embodiment in legislation precede implementation. But policy experimentation means innovating through implementation first, and drafting universal laws and regulations later.

== Policy experimentation versus incrementalism ==
At first sight, policy experimentation displays commonalities with what Lindblom characterizes as the incremental method of successive limited comparisons in making public policy: the exploratory, reversible character of policymaking and the prior reduction of political antagonisms by avoiding drastic change at the outset. Yet, under certain conditions, experimentation can transcend incrementalist tinkering with existing practices and lead to drastic policy departures and transformative change marked by the emergence of new configurations of actors, interests, institutions, ideologies, and goals.

== Tools of experimentation ==
In democratic polities, policy experimentation comes as mostly small-scale explorative pilot projects, as pioneering legislation by individual states in federal systems ("states as laboratories"), as experimental or sunset clauses incorporated into formal legislation, or, very rarely, as a special dispensation for local administrative districts to be exempt from certain provisions of national law.

For the Chinese government, experimentation comes in three main forms as (1) experimental regulation (provisional rules made for trial implementation), (2) "experimental points" (model demonstrations and pilot projects in a specific policy domain), and (3) "experimental zones" (local jurisdictions with broad discretionary powers).
