= Jon Leibowitz =

American lawyer and former FTC chairman

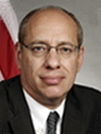

53th Chair of the Federal Trade Commission
- In office March 2, 2009 – February 15, 2013
- President: Barack Obama
- Preceded by: William Kovacic
- Succeeded by: Edith Ramirez

Commissioner of the Federal Trade Commission
- In office September 3, 2004 – February 15, 2013
- President: Barack Obama
- Preceded by: Mozelle W. Thompson
- Succeeded by: Edith Ramirez

Personal details
- Party: Democratic
- Spouse: Ruth Marcus
- Children: 2
- Education: University of Wisconsin, Madison (BA); New York University (JD)

Jon Leibowitz is an American attorney who served as the 53rd chair of the Federal Trade Commission (FTC) from 2009 to 2013. A member of the Democratic Party, he served as a commissioner of the FTC from 2004 to 2013.

During Leibowitz's tenure, the FTC brought privacy cases against Google, Facebook and others for violating consumer privacy, as well as enforcement against "pay-for-delay" deals in which pharmaceutical companies paid competitors to stay out of the market. Prior to joining the FTC, Leibowitz was Vice President for Congressional Affairs from 2000 to 2004 of the MPAA .

Prior to this, Leibowitz served in a variety of roles on Capitol Hill, including as a counsel to the Senate Antitrust Subcommittee in the office of Senator Herb Kohl. From 1984 to 1986, Leibowitz was an attorney in private practice in Washington, D.C. Since leaving the FTC, Leibowitz was a partner at the law firm Davis Polk & Wardwell, where he helped found the "21st Century Privacy Coalition." In 2021, he was appointed to the position of Senior Counsel in the Maryland Attorney General's office. He also serves as vice-chair of the National Consumers League, a consumer advocacy organization.

== Early life and education ==
Leibowitz grew up in Englewood, New Jersey, where he attended Dwight Morrow High School. During his childhood, he developed a reputation as a "smart kid who didn't flaunt his intelligence, and who was friends with everyone".

Leibowitz attended the University of Wisconsin, where he graduated Phi Beta Kappa in 1980 with a bachelor's degree in American History. After completing his undergraduate education, Leibowitz enrolled in the New York University School of Law, where he received his Juris Doctor in 1984. As of 2009, Leibowitz is a member of the District of Columbia Bar.

== Early career ==
In 1986, Leibowitz joined the staff of Senator Paul Simon (D-IL). In 1989, Leibowitz became chief counsel for Senator Herb Kohl (D-WI), serving in the position until 2000. While serving in Kohl's office, Leibowitz additionally worked in the Senate Subcommittee on Juvenile Justice from 1991 to 1994, and as chief counsel to the Subcommittee on Terrorism and Technology from 1995 to 1996. Additionally, he served as Democratic chief counsel and staff director for the Senate Antitrust Subcommittee from 1997 to 2000.

== Federal Trade Commission (FTC) ==
In 2004, President George W. Bush appointed Leibowitz to serve as a member of the Federal Trade Commission (FTC), replacing Mozelle W. Thompson. Leibowitz was sworn in to the position on September 3, 2004, and on March 2, 2009, was chosen to serve as FTC Chair by President Barack Obama. In 2012, U.S. Senate confirmed Leibowitz's appointment for a second term. Leibowitz resigned as both chair and as a member of the FTC on February 15, 2013.

=== Consumer protection ===
During Leibowitz's tenure as chair, the FTC filed more than 40 law enforcement actions to stop scams that prey on consumers suffering from the economic downturn, such as foreclosure "rescue" and mortgage modification schemes, phony debt-reduction and credit-repair services, bogus government grant opportunities, job scams, and get-rich quick frauds. In one of the largest judgments imposed in an FTC case—and one of the few major judgments against companies responsible for the Great Recession—Countrywide settled for $108 million with the FTC in June 2010 for collecting excessive fees from borrowers who were struggling to keep their homes. In 2011, the FTC mailed 450,177 refund checks to homeowners who were allegedly overcharged by Countrywide.

=== Healthcare ===
Leibowitz was active in preserving competition in the health care and pharmaceutical sectors. He criticized of "pay-for-delay" settlements in the pharmaceutical industry. The Commission aggressively worked at stopping pay-for-delay patent settlements in the pharmaceutical industry. These are deals in which a brand-name drug firm pays its potential generic drug rival to prevent price competition in the market. As Leibowitz explained, the practice results not only in windfalls for both companies—sometimes of more than a billion dollars—but also in higher drug prices for consumers. Leibowitz has published articles on this issue and advocates bringing cases against firms that engage in these practices.

An FTC study released in October 2011 revealed that some pharmaceutical companies continued to engage in pay-for-delay deals in FY 2011. The findings prompted Leibowitz to ask Congress' "Super Committee" to restrict these deals, stating that it could help reduce the deficit and lower the nation's healthcare costs.

=== Internet, telecommunications and technology ===
During Leibowitz's tenure, the agency focused on promoting consumer protection, competition and innovation in technology sectors, through both policy initiatives and law enforcement. As FTC Chair, Leibowitz brought a number of high-profile privacy cases against Google, Facebook and other high-profile technology companies for violating consumer privacy as well as major antitrust cases against multiple pharmaceutical companies for engaging in sweetheart "pay-for-delay" deals in which brand pharma companies paid generic competitors to stay out of the market.

The agency released a preliminary staff report December 1, 2010 titled, Protecting Consumer Privacy in an Era of Rapid Change: A Proposed Framework for Businesses and Policymakers. With regard to consumer's online privacy, Leibowitz stated: "The FTC wants to help ensure that the growing, changing, thriving information marketplace is built on a framework that promotes privacy, transparency, business innovation and consumer choice. We believe that's what most Americans want as well."

Also, the FTC proposed revisions to the Children's Online Privacy Protection Act (COPPA) Rule in September 2011 and sought public comments. Leibowitz said the revisions were in response to the rapid changes in technology. "We want to ensure that the COPPA Rule is effective in helping parents protect their children online, without unnecessarily burdening online businesses. We look forward to the continuing thoughtful input from industry, children's advocates, and other stakeholders as we work to update the Rule."

During an October 2011 speech about protecting online consumer privacy while ensuring an internet that generates the free content, Leibowitz coined the term "cyberazzi." Leibowitz explained the term, stating "[a] host of invisible cyberazzi – cookies and other data catchers – follow us as we browse, reporting our every stop and action to marketing firms that, in turn, collect an astonishingly complete profile of online behavior," said Leibowitz.

Under Leibowitz, the FTC settled in 2010 with Intel to restore competition and innovation that was lost as a result of Intel's alleged anticompetitive actions. In May 2010, the FTC closed its high-profile investigation of Google's proposed acquisition of AdMob, concluding it was unlikely to harm competition in the mobile advertising market, citing Apple's move to launch a competing mobile ad network.

Leibowitz urged the commission to "name names" of advertisers who paid to advertise through so-called nuisance adware, software that displays or downloads advertisements on consumers' computers without their consent. Leibowitz has also advocated for balanced "Net Neutrality" rules and for the right of municipalities to offer broadband to consumers free from restrictive state laws.

=== Advertising and marketing to children ===
Leibowitz has called for strong industry self-regulatory initiatives to help combat childhood obesity and ensure that only healthier foods and beverages are marketed to America's children. He has also advocated continued review of entertainment industry marketing practices to prevent children from being exposed to inappropriate content. The commission has completed five reports on this topic since 2000.

=== Energy ===
As FTC chair, Leibowitz was involved in efforts to rein in concentration in the oil industry. In 2011, Leibowitz stated that "[the FTC's] report spells out the factors that determine what consumers pay at the pump, and why gas prices seem to 'rocket up' but feather down." Leibowitz was the one commissioner to dissent on a 2007 FTC Report on Spring/Summer 2006 Nationwide Gasoline Price Increases, which found that the increase could be explained by market forces.

Leibowitz suggested that the plausible explanation for the increase in gasoline prices, that the Commission found, was not necessarily the only explanation. "The question you ask determines the answer you get," he wrote, "whatever theoretical justifications exist don't exclude the real world threat that there was profiteering at the expense of consumers." Similarly, in an earlier report investigating accusations of price gouging by oil companies after Hurricane Katrina, Leibowitz wrote separately to note that a handful of refiners studied displayed "troubling" conduct.

=== Enforcement ===
Leibowitz advocated for re-invigorated enforcement of the FTC Act as a way to stop anticompetitive behavior that can no longer be reached under prevailing judicial interpretation of the antitrust laws. Leibowitz argued that in founding the FTC, "Congress intended to create an agency with authority that extended beyond the limits of the Sherman Antitrust Act." Leibowitz has supported the use of Section 5 of the FTC Act ("unfair methods of competition") beyond the Sherman Act in standard setting cases, in a case involving a failed agreement to fix prices, and in other areas where companies behaved unscrupulously. With Commissioner J. Thomas Rosch (a Republican) and Commissioner Pamela Jones Harbour (an Independent), Leibowitz repudiated a 2008 Department of Justice Report on monopolization, saying that DoJ's approach placed "a thumb on the scales in favor of firms with monopoly or near-monopoly power and against other equally significant stakeholders."

== 21st Century Privacy Coalition ==
Leibowitz is also founding co-chair of the "21st Century Privacy Coalition," a coalition of telecommunications companies and trade associations focused on relaxing federal privacy laws. The 21st Century Privacy Coalition aims to help companies escape regulations on how they have to handle customer data.

Leibowitz formerly served as co-chair of the 21st Century Privacy Coalition, a group that has advocated for a strong federal privacy law to protect American consumers, but has also been criticized for trying to loosen regulations on how companies have to protect consumer's sensitive information.

=== Internet privacy repeal ===
The 21st Century Coalition and Leibowitz were strong advocates behind April 2017 legislation passed by President Trump that repealed many of the Obama-era regulations on internet privacy, allowing ISPs to sell its users' data. Though Leibowitz did not support that Trump-supported repeal, he did tell CNN that the bill's effects on privacy are overblown and called complaints "hyper-partisan hyperbole," criticizing both sides of the Net Neutrality Debate. Leibowitz justified his position by claiming that the law would allow a new set of rules for the entire industry. In a February 2020 op-ed, Leibowtz called for lawmakers to "do their job" and pass a strong national privacy law, noting bipartisan support for such a law.

== Personal life ==
He is married to journalist Ruth Marcus of The Washington Post. The couple have two daughters; Emma and Julia. In June 2013, Leibowitz joined the Washington D.C. office of Davis Polk & Wardwell LLP.

== Recognition ==
Bloomberg Businessweek named Leibowitz a "Power Broker" in 2011. Leibowitz's "sound bite", a featured quote from all honorees, was "Despite some good actors, self-regulation of privacy … is not working adequately for American consumers. We deserve far better from the companies we entrust our data to."

== See also ==
- List of former FTC commissioners

Political offices
Preceded by William Kovacic	Chair of the Federal Trade Commission; 2009–2013	Succeeded by Edith Ramirez
