= Ruth Marcus =

Ruth Marcus may refer to:

- Ruth Barcan Marcus (1921–2012), philosopher and logician
- Ruth Marcus (journalist) (born 1958), former opinion columnist for the Washington Post
