= Christine A. Varney =

American lawyer (born 1955)

Christine Varney
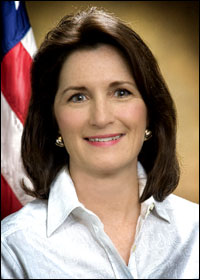

United States Assistant Attorney General for the Antitrust Division
- In office April 20, 2009 – August 4, 2011
- President: Barack Obama
- Preceded by: Thomas O. Barnett
- Succeeded by: William Baer (2013)

Commissioner of the Federal Trade Commission
- In office October 17, 1994 – August 5, 1997
- President: Bill Clinton
- Preceded by: Dennis Yao
- Succeeded by: Mozelle W. Thompson

White House Cabinet Secretary
- In office January 20, 1993 – October 14, 1994
- President: Bill Clinton
- Preceded by: Daniel Casse
- Succeeded by: Kitty Higgins

Personal details
- Born: December 17, 1955 (age 70) Washington, D.C., U.S.
- Party: Democratic
- Spouse: Thomas J. "Tom" Graham
- Children: 2
- Education: State University of New York, Albany (BA); Syracuse University (MPA); Georgetown University (JD)
- Website: Official website

Christine A. Varney (born December 17, 1955) is an American antitrust attorney who served as the U.S. assistant attorney general of the Antitrust Division for the Obama administration and as a Federal Trade commissioner in the Clinton administration. Since August 2011, Varney has been a partner of the New York law firm Cravath, Swaine & Moore, where she chairs the antitrust department.

== Early life and education ==
Varney was born in Washington, D.C., and raised in Syracuse, New York. She earned a Bachelor of Arts degree from University at Albany, SUNY, in 1977. As an undergraduate, she studied abroad at Trinity College, Dublin. She later earned a Master of Public Administration from the Maxwell School of Citizenship and Public Affairs at Syracuse University, and a Juris Doctor from Georgetown Law School.

== Career ==
=== Early career and Clinton administration ===
Varney served as general counsel to the Democratic National Committee from 1989 to 1992; chief counsel to the Bill Clinton 1992 presidential campaign, general counsel to the 1992 Presidential Inaugural Committee, associate and partner of the firm of Hogan & Hartson, and as assistant to the president and White House cabinet secretary. In the latter role, she acted as a liaison between the White House and cabinet departments. She stated the Clinton administration's philosophy of cabinet management this way: "if you don’t surprise us, we won't micromanage you!"

=== Federal Trade Commission (FTC) ===
Varney served in the Clinton administration as a member of the Federal Trade Commission (FTC) from October 17, 1994, to August 5, 1997. As a commissioner, Varney voted to bring actions against Toys "R" Us for pressuring manufacturers to keep popular toys out of discount stores; to pursue charges of unfair advertising against the R. J. Reynolds Tobacco Company, for its "Joe Camel" advertising campaign; and to impose conditions on the mega-merger between Time Warner and Turner Broadcasting System.

Varney became known for spearheading the FTC's examination of privacy and commerce, and for promoting innovation market theory analysis in the fields of information technology and biotechnology. In 1997, Varney was succeeded by Mozelle W. Thompson as a member of the FTC.

=== Lobbying and legal work ===
Varney was a partner at the Washington, D.C. law firm Hogan & Hartson, where she chaired the Internet practice group, and was registered as a lobbyist. As a lawyer, Varney represented and advised companies on matters such as antitrust, privacy, business planning corporate governance, intellectual property, and general liability issues. She represented Netscape during United States v. Microsoft Corp. and its merger with AOL. There, her other clients included eBay, DoubleClick, The Washington Post Company's Newsweek Interactive subsidiary, Dow Jones & Company, AOL, Synopsys, Compaq, Gateway, the Liberty Alliance, and RealNetworks.

Varney was a fundraiser for the Hillary Clinton campaign during the 2008 Democratic Party presidential primaries and the 2016 Democratic Party presidential primaries. Following the election of President Barack Obama, in 2009, Varney served as personnel counsel on the Obama–Biden Transition Project.

=== Assistant Attorney General (AAG) ===
Varney was nominated for the position of Assistant Attorney General for the Antitrust Division of the Department of Justice in February 2009, and confirmed by the Senate on April 20, 2009. On August 4, 2011, Varney resigned her position at the Justice Department.

=== Post-AAG career ===
Evan Chesler, then presiding partner at Cravath, recruited Varney in September 2011, when average partner pay at the firm was 3.1 million. Varney is only the fourth outsider recruited to be named a partner at the firm in 50 years. There, Varney has advised clients on mergers across various industries, including acquisitions of Time Warner by ATT, Virgin Atlantic by Delta, Talenti by Unilever, Pinnacle by Conagra, and Heinz by Kraft

Varney joined the faculty of Columbia Law School as a lecturer in law in 2017 and teaches the course Antitrust in Action, alongside her Cravath colleague David R. Marriott.

Varney is recognized by The National Law Journal as one of the "100 Most Influential Lawyers in America", and as among the 50 "Governance, Risk & Compliance Trailblazers & Pioneers". Law360 also named her a "Competition MVP", and Global Competition Review named her "Lawyer of the Year".

During the 2020 Democratic Party presidential primaries, Varney made the maximum allowable campaign contributions to candidates Pete Buttigieg and Joe Biden.

== Positions ==
=== Online privacy ===
While at the FTC, Varney predicted that online privacy would "become a critical aspect of [the FTC's] consumer protection responsibilities." Former FTC Chairman Robert Pitofsky has credited Varney as "the leading force in getting the agency active on the online privacy front."

In advocating adoption of the FTC's privacy guidelines, Varney identified a major goal of the FTC's Privacy Initiative as "avoid[ing] cumbersome regulation by facilitating the development of a set of voluntary principles." Varney's promotion of voluntary privacy guidelines was criticized by consumer privacy advocates as insufficient to provide adequate consumer protection. Others, however, lauded Varney's approach, believing that tight government regulations would stifle innovation.

As legal counsel and spokesperson for the Online Privacy Alliance, Varney championed self-regulation as the basis for encouraging compliance with Internet privacy standards. Over time, Varney's position changed — according to an article from November 2000, Varney said, "You could characterize the OPA as having a mantra of 'self-regulation, self-regulation, self-regulation’ . . . Next year, the mantra will be 'industry best practices as part of a comprehensive solution, and there may be legislation that would help.’"

=== Health and pharmaceuticals ===
As an FTC commissioner, Varney voiced concerns about legislation that would grant certain antitrust immunities to doctors, as well as potential competitive problems caused by vertical integration of drug companies into the pharmacy benefits management market.

As Assistant Attorney General, Varney has suggested that there may be a lack of competition in the health insurance market, and has endorsed a measure that would revoke the federal antitrust exemption for health insurers. Varney has also been critical of "reverse payment patent settlement" or "pay-for-delay" agreements, in which a potential generic competitor delays entry of a generic drug in exchange for a payment from a branded drug manufacturer with market power. A brief signed by Varney argues that such agreements are "presumptively unlawful", signifying a departure from the previous DOJ positions, aligning the DOJ's position with that of the FTC.

=== Antitrust ===
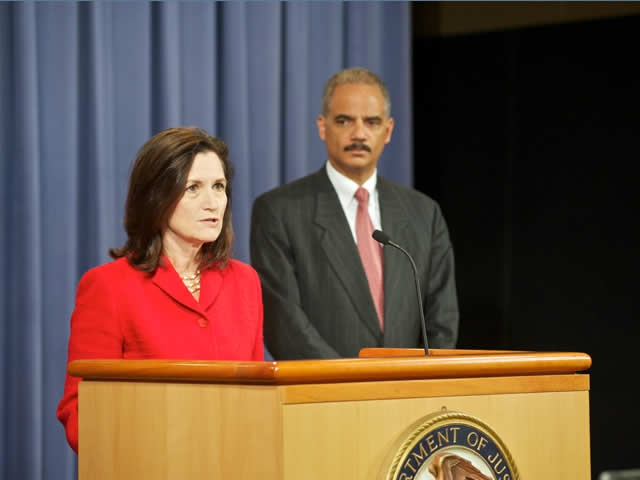
Varney (left) with Attorney General Eric Holder (right) speaks on credit card surcharge, in 2010, as Assistant Attorney General for the Antitrust Division.

As a Commissioner at the FTC, Varney was outspoken about monopolies in innovation markets and about the possibility that vertical mergers create unfair barriers to entry in networked industries.

Upon her nomination as the Assistant Attorney General for the Antitrust Division by President Barack Obama, Varney was predicted to be a more aggressive enforcer of antitrust laws than her predecessors in the Bush administration. Her nomination was confirmed by the United States Senate on April 20, 2009, by a vote of 87 to 1.

Consistent with predictions, one of Varney's first acts as an Assistant Attorney General was to withdraw the Justice Department's 2008 guidelines for enforcement of Section 2 of the Sherman Act. In her first public comments as an Assistant Attorney General, Varney criticized the guidelines for "effectively straightjacket[ing] antitrust enforcers and courts from redressing monopolistic abuses, thereby allowing all but the most bold and predatory conduct to go unpunished and undeterred." She delivered the speech twice, first, on May 11, 2009, at the Center for American Progress and, on the following day, at the United States Chamber of Commerce.

Varney opened inquiries into the financial services and wireless phone industries, and began probing the settlement between Google and the Association of American Publishers.

Between 2009 and 2011, the Antitrust Division's criminal enforcement work resulted in the assessment of over $1.5 billion in fines against criminal conspirators.

As both a Commissioner of the FTC and Assistant Attorney General, Varney has called for more cooperation in international antitrust enforcement. As an FTC Commissioner, Varney stated, "there is much more to be done by way of fostering communication and cooperation between enforcement authorities," and promoted adherence to international antitrust guidelines. Similarly, in her first public remarks as Assistant Attorney General, Varney stated, "I believe that as targets of antitrust enforcement have expanded their operations worldwide, there is a greater need for U.S. authorities to reach out to other antitrust agencies." Since then, Varney has called for greater convergence, cooperation, and transparency between international antitrust enforcement agencies.

During her tenure, Varney successfully prevented several mergers and acquisitions, including NASDAQ and Intercontinental Exchange from acquiring NYSE Euronext, as well as Verifone's acquisition of Hypercom. She allowed the mergers of Live Nation Entertainment with Ticketmaster, and of Comcast with NBCUniversal. After Varney and the Administrator of the Grain Inspection, Packers and Stockyards Administration proposed rules to combat price fixing by meat packing industry, Congress defunded its enforcement.

Varney approved the merger of Continental Airlines and United Airlines, on condition that several assets were to be divested.

In October 2010, Varney brought an anti-competition suit against Visa Inc., MasterCard, each of which soon settled, and American Express, which did not.

Epic Games enlisted the counsel of Varney and Cravath, Swaine & Moore in their antitrust lawsuits against Apple, Inc. and Google filed in August 2020 over monopolistic practices on the App Store and Google Play storefronts after they had forced Epic's Fortnite off the service.

== Boards and affiliations ==
Varney was instrumental in establishing several industry associations, including the Online Privacy Alliance, which helped promote self-regulation and identify Internet best practices in the field of online privacy. She has served on the board of directors of TRUSTe, a privacy certification and seal program.

She serves on the boards of trustees of the American Museum of Natural History and Third Way; on the boards of directors of the Brennan Center for Justice and the Legal Aid Society; and on the board of advisors of the American Constitution Society.

Varney is a fellow of the American Bar Foundation and serves as a member of the International Bar Association, the Council on Foreign Relations, The American Law Institute, and the Economic Club of New York.

== See also ==
- List of former FTC commissioners

Political offices
Preceded by Daniel Casse	White House Cabinet Secretary; 1993–1994	Succeeded by Kitty Higgins
