= Wendy Schaetzel Lesko =

- Born: 1950 (age 75–76)
- Education: Rollins College, International Institute for Restorative Practices
- Occupations: Author, Nonprofit executive
- Spouse: Matthew Lesko
- Writing career
- Subjects: Youth activism, Youth studies
- Notable works: Why Aren't We Doing This! Collaborating with Minors in Major Ways (2023); No Kidding Around (1992)
- Notable awards: Youth MOVE National Dr. Gary M. Blau Professional of the Year ROCKSTAR Award (2019), WETA-TV "Hometown Heroes" Award (2004)
- Website: www.youthinfusion.org

Wendy Schaetzel Lesko is co-founder of Youth Infusion as well as co-founder of the Youth Activism Project. Lesko is an author of several books on youth-led advocacy, especially in the public policy arena, and recognized nationally as an expert on intergenerational collaboration.

== Biography ==
During Lesko's last two years at Rollins College, she created a recreational program for 100 children of Florida orange pickers about 45 minutes from campus. After graduating, she worked as a community organizer for Cesar Chavez's United Farm Workers Union.

Her career has included working as the managing editor of the Congressional Monitor, and starting "Today on the Hill," a live daily radio program focused on action in the U.S. Congress, broadcast on WTOP in Washington, D.C. Lesko lives in Washington, D.C., with her husband Matthew Lesko. Wendy met Matthew in 1982 while she was working at the Congressional Monitor.

In 1992, Lesko launched the influential Activism 2000 Project that introduced youth-led policy participation that contrasted with community service.

In 2004, together with a group of middle school students, she founded the nonprofit Youth Activism Project and its first international initiative called School Girls Unite in Maryland, These youth together with their partners in Mali, co-authored the bilingual action guide, Girls Gone Activist! How to Change the World through Education. Another major achievement of School Girls Unite was its victorious grassroots campaign that helped establish the United Nations International Day of the Girl Child, recognized annually on October 11 around the world.

Lesko has served on advisory boards for several organizations, including CommonAction. She has presented hundreds of speeches and workshops ranging from the National Human Services Assembly to the US State Department International Visitors Leadership Program. Youth Voice Plus Youth Vote is the subject of her 2017 TEDx Talk.

In response to the school-to-prison pipeline, Lesko pursued a graduate degree with the International Institute for Restorative Practices and in 2018, she received a master's degree .

In 2018, Anika Manzoor, one of the co-founders at age 12 of School Girls Unite and the Youth Activism Project, became the first full-time paid executive director.

Beginning in 2021, Lesko started Youth Infusion which focuses on building anti-racist intergenerational organizations. In 2023, she co-authored a book called Why Aren't We Doing This! Collaborating with Minors in Major Ways with Denise Webb.

== Books ==
- Why Aren't We Doing This! Collaborating with Minors in Major Ways (2023) with Denise Webb. Published by Youth Infusion ISBN 979-8-860-66319-0
- Safer Schools: Students Talk About Talking Circles (2018) Published by Wendy Schaetzel Lesko.
- Unleashing the Potential of Young RP Advocates (2015) Presented at International Institute for Restorative Practices Conference.
- Catalyst! Successful Strategies to Empower Young Advocates (2013) Published by Youth Activism Project.
- Knock-Your-Socks-Off Training Teens To Be Successful Activists! The Complete Guide For Facilitating A 1-2 Hour Workshop. (2005) Published by Youth Activism Project.
- Maximum Youth Involvement: The Complete Gameplan for Community Action (2003) Published by Youth Activism Project. ASIN: B0006SBDI4
- Youth As Equal Partners (2002) with Adam Kendall. Published by United Way of America.
- Youth Empowerment Question Why (2001) Published by North Carolina Department of Health.
- Youth! The 26% Solution (1998) with Emanuel Tsourounis, II. Published by Information USA. ISBN 978-1-878346-47-6
- Student Activist Training Action Guide (1997) Published by Mothers Against Drunk Driving & U.S. Department of Transportation National Highway Transportation Safety Administration.
- Youth Advocacy Module (1996) Published by U.S. Health & Human Service.
- No Kidding Around: America's Young Activists Are Changing Our World and You Can Too! (1992) Published by Information USA. ISBN 978-1-878346-10-0
- The People Rising: The Campaign Against the Bork Nomination (1989) with Michael Pertschuk. Published by Thunder's Mouth Press. ISBN 978-0-938410-89-8
- The Maternity Sourcebook: 230 Basic Decisions for Pregnancy, Birth, and Baby Care. (1984) Published by Warner Books. ISBN 978-0-446-37525-2
- The Maternity Sourcebook. (1985) (Reissue) with Matthew Lesko. Published by Warner Books. ISBN 978-0-446-38375-2

== Recognition ==
In 2019 Lesko received Youth MOVE National Dr. Gary M. Blau Professional of the Year ROCKSTAR Award. [7]

Lesko has been recognized as a leading expert in youth-led policy advocacy by diverse publications from across the nation, including The Washington Post, Houston Chronicle and Youth Today.

Together with Karen Jackson-Knight, Lesko co-founded SPARK, a community-based program that provided free tutoring to hundreds of public school students for over a decade. WETA-TV's "Hometown Heroes" Award in 2004.
