= Pamela Jones (disambiguation) =

Pamela Jones, PJ, is a website editor.

Pamela Jones or Pam Jones may also refer to:

- Pamela Jones, character in Alice Upside Down
- Pamela Jones, character in Bridget Jones's Diary
- Pamjones, minor planet

== See also ==
- Pamela Jones Harbour
- Pamela Goldsmith-Jones
