= Mary Azcuenaga =

American attorney

Mary Laurie Azcuenaga

Commissioner of the Federal Trade Commission
- In office November 27, 1984 – June 3, 1998
- President: Ronald Reagan; George H. W. Bush; Bill Clinton
- Preceded by: Michael Pertschuk
- Succeeded by: Thomas B. Leary

Personal details
- Born: July 25, 1945 (age 81) Council, Idaho
- Party: Independent
- Education: Stanford University (A.B.); University of Chicago Law School (J.D.)

Mary Laurie Azcuenaga (born July 25, 1945) is an American attorney who served from 1984 to 1998 as a member of the Federal Trade Commission (FTC). As of 2017, Azcuenaga is one of just three political independents to serve on the FTC.

== Early life and career ==
Born to a family of Basque-American descent, Azcuenaga was born on July 25, 1945, in Council, Idaho. Azcuenaga received her undergraduate degree from Stanford University, graduating with a bachelor's degree (A.B.) in 1967.

In 1973, she graduated from the University of Chicago Law School with a J.D. degree. Azcuenaga began her career within the Federal Trade Commission (FTC), joining the agency as an assistant to the General Counsel in 1975.

== Member of the Federal Trade Commission (FTC) ==
Azcuenaga remained in various legal roles within the FTC until 1984, when she was appointed to serve as a commissioner by President Ronald Reagan. Azcuenaga was sworn into the body on November 27, 1984, to a term ending on September 25, 1991, replacing former commissioner Michael Pertschuk.

The Washington Post reported on her nomination by noting that as a political independent, she was seen as less conservative than the FTC's two Republican appointees. Additionally, it was noted that Azcuenaga was seen as a strong nominee owing to her being a woman of Hispanic background. However, the article noted that Azcuenaga "doesn't believe in using the Hispanic label for political advantage", with Azcuenaga herself stating "I've been told I count as a Hispanic... I'm proud of my Basque heritage."

In 1991, she was re-appointed to a second term in office by President George H. W. Bush in 1991. Azcuenaga remained on the FTC until June 3, 1998, when she chose to resign months before her second term was set to expire. During her tenure, Azcuenaga joined a majority in opposition to taking action against cigarette brand Camel over its "Joe Camel" cartoon mascot. In a joint statement, Azcuenaga argued:

Although it may seem intuitive to some that the Joe Camel advertising campaign would lead more children to smoke, or lead children to smoke more, the evidence to support that intuition is not there.

Azcuenaga was replaced on the FTC in 1999 by antitrust attorney Thomas B. Leary, a member of the Republican Party. As of 2017, Azcuenaga is one of just three independents to have served on the FTC, along with Philip Elman (who served from 1961 to 1970) and Pamela Jones Harbour (who served from 2003 to 2009).
