= Mozelle W. Thompson =

American attorney

Commissioner of the Federal Trade Commission
- In office December 17, 1997 – August 31, 2004
- President: Bill Clinton; George W. Bush
- Preceded by: Christine A. Varney
- Succeeded by: Jon Leibowitz

Personal details
- Born: Pittsburgh, Pennsylvania
- Education: Columbia University (BA, JD); Princeton University (MPA)

Mozelle Willmont Thompson is an American attorney who served as a member of the Federal Trade Commission (FTC) from 1997 to 2004. Thompson was the second African American to serve as a member of the FTC.

== Education ==
Originally from Pittsburgh, Pennsylvania, Thompson attended Columbia University for both his undergraduate and legal education. Thompson graduated with a bachelor's degree from Columbia College in 1976 and received his Juris Doctor (J.D.) degree from Columbia Law School in 1981. After law school, he attended the Woodrow Wilson School of Public and International Affairs at Princeton University, where he received his M.P.A.

== Legal career ==
After graduating from law school, Thompson served as a law clerk to judge William M. Hoeveler of the United States District Court for the Southern District of Florida. Thompson later practiced law in the private sector at Skadden Arps Slate Meagher & Flom in New York, where he worked from 1982 to 1990. Thompson has also served in academia, having previously been an adjunct associate professor at Fordham University School of Law.

Thompson later held posts in the public sector, serving as acting executive director, senior vice president and general counsel of the New York State Housing Finance Agency and the State of New York Mortgage Agency.

Thompson joined the federal government in 1993, where he joined the Department of the Treasury in 1993 a Principal Deputy Assistant Secretary for Financial Policy. In this capacity, Thompson oversaw the operations of the Federal Financing Bank and the Office of Corporate Finance, and helped refinance the United States Postal Service (USPS) as well as Oglethorpe Power in Georgia.

=== Federal Trade Commission (FTC) ===
In 1997, Thompson was one of three candidates under consideration to replace Steven Wallman on the Securities and Exchange Commission (SEC). Instead, Thompson was appointed that year President Bill Clinton to serve on the Federal Trade Commission for a term that expired on September 25, 2003. He replaced the vacant seat held by Christine A. Varney and was in office until August 2004, until he was succeeded by Jon Leibowitz.

During his tenure at the Federal Trade Commission, he also served as a delegate to the Organization of Economic Cooperation and Development and chaired its Committee on Consumer Policy. In 2004, Thompson ultimately agreed to support the then-proposed Sony-BMG merger deal, though he stated he had reservations about the potential impact of the deal on the music industry.

As of 2021, Thompson is one of just three African-Americans to have served on the FTC: The other two were A. Leon Higginbotham Jr. (served from 1962-1964) and Pamela Jones Harbour (served from 2003-2009).

=== Post-FTC career ===
In 2008, Thompson served as a team leader in the presidential transition of Barack Obama team in charge of Economics and International Trade, in which he led the review of the U.S. Securities and Exchange Commission.

After retiring from public service, he started his eponymous consulting company and advises clients such as Facebook and The Walt Disney Company. He served on the advisory board of Facebook for ten years and Samsung's advisory board for three years. He is an entrepreneur and adviser to young startup companies. Thompson is also engaged with several charitable and mentoring organizations like the Lenfest Scholars Foundation where he serves as Chairman of the Board.

== Awards ==
In 2014, he received the John Jay Award for outstanding professional achievement from Columbia College, along with Nobel Prize winner Robert Lefkowitz and hedge fund manager, Olympic fencer James Melcher. In 2016, he received Columbia University alumni association's highest honor, the Alumni Medal. In 2025, Princeton University awarded him its Award for Service to Princeton.

== See also ==
- List of former FTC commissioners
