= Philip Elman =

American lawyer (1918–1999)

Commissioner of the Federal Trade Commission
- In office April 21, 1961 – October 18, 1970
- President: John F. Kennedy; Lyndon B. Johnson; Richard Nixon

Personal details
- Born: March 14, 1918 Paterson, New Jersey, U.S.
- Died: November 30, 1999 (aged 81) Washington, D.C., U.S.
- Party: Independent
- Education: City College of New York (BA); Harvard University (LLB)

Philip Elman (March 14, 1918 – November 30, 1999) was an American lawyer at the United States Department of Justice and former member of the Federal Trade Commission (FTC). Elman is best known for writing the government's brief in Brown v. Board of Education. Elman is also notable for being one of just three political independents to have ever served on the FTC.

== Early life and education ==
Elman was born in Paterson, New Jersey, to Polish-Jewish immigrants who worked in the silk industry. During the Great Depression, he moved with his family to New York City, where he attended DeWitt Clinton High School and the City College of New York. He went on to Harvard Law School, where he was an editor of the Harvard Law Review in 1938 and 1939.

== Legal career ==
=== Judicial clerkships ===
Elman began his legal career as a law clerk to Judge Calvert Magruder of the U.S. Court of Appeals for the First Circuit, 1939–1940. After a brief stint at the Federal Communications Commission (1940–1941), he served as a law clerk to U.S. Supreme Court Justice Felix Frankfurter from 1941 to 1943. Among the opinions Elman was involved in drafting during his clerkship was Frankfurter's dissent in the second Flag Salute case, West Virginia State Board of Education v. Barnette. Elman and Frankfurter remained close friends; Elman would later recount that Frankfurter still regarded him as his clerk for years after Elman had joined the Justice Department.

=== Solicitor General's office ===
After his clerkship with Frankfurter, Elman joined the United States Department of Justice, where he worked as an assistant to the Solicitor General of the United States from 1944 to 1961. He took part in drafting briefs and arguments for a number of civil rights cases, including Shelley v. Kraemer.

In his oral history about his time at the Solicitor General's office, Elman recounted his involvement in Brown v. Board of Education. He explained how the Solicitor General's brief used the phrase "with all deliberate speed":

It's because we were the first to suggest, and all the parties and amicus on both sides rejected it after the government proposed it, that if the Court should hold that racial segregation in public schools is unconstitutional, it should give the district courts a reasonable period of time to work out the details and timing of the implementation of the decision. In other words, "with all deliberate speed".

Elman wanted a "middle ground" between reaffirming the "separate but equal" doctrine of Plessy v. Ferguson and requiring immediate integration of all public schools, even though that meant separating the constitutional principle from the judicial remedy. He believed that otherwise the Supreme Court could not have decided the case unanimously and the American public would not have tolerated the decision.

According to Elman, he borrowed the deliberate speed concept from antitrust cases and boundary dispute cases in the United States Supreme Court, particularly opinions by Oliver Wendell Holmes Jr., but he had difficulty tracking down the phrase's precise origin. Researchers from the National Association for the Advancement of Colored People later discovered the phrase in Francis Thompson's poem, The Hound of Heaven.

=== Federal Trade Commission ===
Elman wanted to become an Assistant Attorney General of the United States, but an interview with then-United States Attorney General Robert F. Kennedy did not go as he had hoped. Instead, Elman was nominated to a seat on the Federal Trade Commission. The United States Senate confirmed the nomination. Elman served on the FTC from 1961 to 1970.

While at the FTC, his main agenda was enforcing federal laws against false advertising. His actions led to the FTC requiring warning labels on cigarette packs in the United States. One of Elman's assistants at the FTC was a young Richard Posner, who went on to become a professor at University of Chicago Law School and a judge on the United States Court of Appeals for the Seventh Circuit.

Since Elman's tenure, only two other political independents have served on the body: Mary Azcuenaga, who served from 1984 to 1998, and Pamela Jones Harbour, who served from 2003 to 2009.

== Later in life ==
Elman taught at Georgetown University Law Center from 1970 to 1976.

Elman admitted in his oral history that he and Justice Frankfurter conferred privately about the intended remedy in the case, which technically constituted a breach of judicial ethics. He was publicly criticized for this in 1987 by Time and The New York Times. Elman defended both himself and Justice Frankfurter by stating that these discussions took place before the United States became a party to the case, and even then, the United States was not an adversary party but rather an amicus curiae.

Elman died at Sibley Memorial Hospital in 1999.

== See also ==
- List of former FTC commissioners
- List of law clerks for the second seat of the Supreme Court of the United States
