= Beryl Anthony Jr. =

American lawyer and politician (1938–2025)

Beryl Anthony
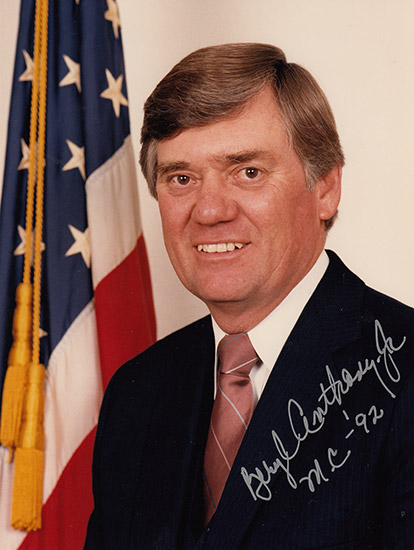

Chair of the Democratic Congressional Campaign Committee
- In office January 3, 1987 – January 3, 1991
- Leader: Jim Wright; Tom Foley
- Preceded by: Tony Coelho
- Succeeded by: Vic Fazio

Member of the U.S. House of Representatives from Arkansas's 4th district
- In office January 3, 1979 – January 3, 1993
- Preceded by: Ray Thornton
- Succeeded by: Jay Dickey

Personal details
- Born: Beryl Franklin Anthony Jr. February 21, 1938 El Dorado, Arkansas, U.S.
- Died: January 11, 2025 (aged 86) Palm City, Florida, U.S.
- Party: Democratic
- Spouse: Sheila F. Anthony
- Relatives: Vince Foster (brother-in-law)
- Education: University of Arkansas (BS, JD)

Beryl Franklin Anthony Jr. (February 21, 1938 – January 11, 2025) was an American lawyer and politician who represented Arkansas in the United States House of Representatives for seven terms from 1979 to 1993.

== Early life and education ==
Anthony was born in El Dorado, Arkansas, the son of Oma Lee Roark and Beryl Franklin Anthony. He attended the Union County public schools, graduating from El Dorado High School in 1956. In 1961, he received a Bachelor of Science and Bachelor of Arts degrees from the University of Arkansas where he became a member of the Sigma Chi fraternity. He obtained a Juris Doctor from the same university in 1963.

== Legal career prior to Congress ==
Anthony was admitted to the Arkansas bar in 1963 and began practice in El Dorado. He became assistant attorney general from 1964 to 1965; deputy prosecuting attorney in Union County from 1966 to 1970; prosecuting attorney for the 13th Judicial District from 1971 to 1976, and legal counsel to Anthony Forest Products Co. in 1977. He started his own private practice of law in 1977.

== Political career ==
Anthony was a delegate to Arkansas State Democratic conventions from 1964 to 1978.

=== Congress ===
In November 1978, he was elected as a Democrat to the United States House of Representatives and served seven terms, from January 3, 1979, to January 3, 1993.

Vice president of his freshman class in Congress, Anthony was a founding member of the Sunbelt Coalition, a group that monitored the legislative impact upon southern states. After one term, he was appointed to the House Ways and Means Committee. He also served on the Oversight and Trade Subcommittees as well as the Select Committee on Children, Youth, and Families. Anthony chaired the Democratic Congressional Campaign Committee from 1987 to 1991. He maintained a conservative voting record in Congress, similar to other Southern Democrats.

As a member of the Ways and Means Committee, Anthony pursued a variety of important issues. In the 1980s, he played a major role in restructuring the Social Security trust fund. He championed legislation for improved rural health care, for which he was given awards by both the Arkansas Hospital Association and the American Hospital Association. In his last terms, he focused on international trade, working on the North American Free Trade Agreement (NAFTA) and on legislation for the General Agreement on Tariffs and Trade (GATT).

In 1988, Congress created the bipartisan Anthony Public Finance Commission, composed of mayors, governors, local government officials, and members of the finance community, to recommend legislation to enable local governments to better finance the building of roads, schools, hospitals, and wastewater treatment facilities. The commission's Arbitrage Relief Provision, enacted in 1989, substantially lessened the borrowing costs for infrastructure investments.

Due in part to his involvement with the House banking scandal, Anthony lost his bid for renomination in the Democratic Primary runoff in June 1992 to Arkansas Secretary of State William J. "Bill" McCuen who lost the general election to Republican Jay W. Dickey due to a series of embarrassing incidents. McCuen received campaign funding from the National Rifle Association (NRA) due to Anthony's support of legislation limiting so-called “Cop Killer” bullets.

== Activities after leaving Congress ==
In January 1993, Anthony became a partner in the Washington, D.C. office of Winston & Strawn. His clients have included major trade associations, governmental entities, and national and multinational corporations. On Capitol Hill and before the White House and executive agencies, Anthony has worked on matters involving health care reform, Superfund, trade relations with China, tax law changes affecting pharmaceuticals, and authorization and funding of major weapons systems. He was a member of the board of directors of Beverly Enterprises which in 2006 before its acquisition by a private equity firm, operated 345 skilled nursing facilities, 18 assisted living centers, and 56 hospice/home care centers.

== Personal life and death ==
Anthony's wife, Sheila Foster Anthony is the sister of Vince Foster, the deputy White House counsel who committed suicide in 1993. The couple's first child was born in 1964. She was a teacher before getting a law degree. In 1993, after working in the U.S. Commerce Department as the nominated Assistant Secretary for Legislation and Intergovernmental Affairs for several months, she moved to the U.S. Department of Justice in a similar position, where she worked for two years. From 1997 to 2002, she was a commissioner at the Federal Trade Commission.

Anthony died in Palm City, Florida, on January 11, 2025, at the age of 86.

== Notes ==
U.S. House of Representatives
Preceded by Ray Thornton	Member of the U.S. House of Representatives from Arkansas's 4th congressional district 1979–1993	Succeeded by Jay W. Dickey
Party political offices
Preceded by Tony Coelho	Chair of the Democratic Congressional Campaign Committee; 1987–1991	Succeeded by Vic Fazio
