= Sheila F. Anthony =

American attorney

Sheila Anthony

Commissioner of the Federal Trade Commission
- In office September 30, 1997 – September 25, 2003
- President: Bill Clinton; George W. Bush
- Preceded by: Janet Steiger
- Succeeded by: Pamela Jones Harbour

Personal details
- Born: Sheila Foster; Hope, Arkansas, United States
- Political party: Democratic
- Spouse: Beryl Anthony (m. 1962; died 2025)
- Relatives: Vince Foster (brother)
- Education: University of Arkansas (BA); American University (JD)

Sheila Foster Anthony is an American attorney and former government official. From 1997 to 2002, she served as a member of the Federal Trade Commission (FTC).

== Early life and education ==
Anthony is a native of Hope, Arkansas. Anthony received her undergraduate education at the University of Arkansas, graduating in 1962. Anthony went on to receive her degree in law from Washington College of Law at American University.

== Early career ==
Prior to entering government, Anthony practiced law at Dow, Lohnes & Albertson in Washington, D.C., where she specialized in intellectual property (IP) law. From 1993 to 1995, Anthony served as Assistant Attorney General for Legislative Affairs. Anthony aided the development of a joint regulation by the Executive Office for Immigration Review and Immigration and Naturalization Services, allowing immigration judges to enter uncontested stipulated orders for deportation or exclusion without a hearing. This was codified under the Illegal Immigration Reform and Immigrant Responsibility Act of 1996. Anthony encouraged Congress to pass reforms reducing frivolous prisoner litigation.

== Federal Trade Commission (FTC) ==
In 1997, President Bill Clinton nominated her to replace Janet Steiger on the FTC. Upon her nomination to the FTC in 1997, she was described as an "unknown but politically connected intellectual property attorney" who would likely support the agency's then-ongoing scrutiny of online service company AOL.

In 2000, Anthony joined a 3-2 vote to reach a consent decree with McCormick & Company for offering discriminatory discounts to grocers. This marked the first-ever FTC action on slotting fees, as well as its first enforcement of the Robinson-Patman Act in a decade. In the run-up to the FTC's approval of the proposed merger between AOL and Time Warner, Anthony was seen as a key swing vote. Other notable votes included the unanimous approval of BP Amoco's purchase of ARCO in 2000, and a 2-2 deadlock (following the recusal of Chairman Timothy Muris) which resulted in PepsiCo's acquisition of the Quaker Oats Company in 2001. In 2003, Anthony entreated media outlets to voluntarily regulate deceptive advertising of weight-loss products prior to publication.

She was replaced as a member of the FTC by Pamela Jones Harbour in 2003.

== Personal life ==
Anthony was married to Beryl Anthony Jr., a former Democratic member of the House of Representatives from Arkansas, from 1962 until his death in 2025. They had two daughters and five granddaughters.

Anthony and her husband provided evidence that she had referred her brother, Deputy White House Counsel Vince Foster, to psychiatric counseling when he divulged depression before his suicide on July 20, 1993. In 2016, she wrote an op-ed in the Washington Post criticizing Donald Trump for repeating conspiracy theories about her brother's suicide.
