= Noah J. Phillips =

American attorney (born 1978)

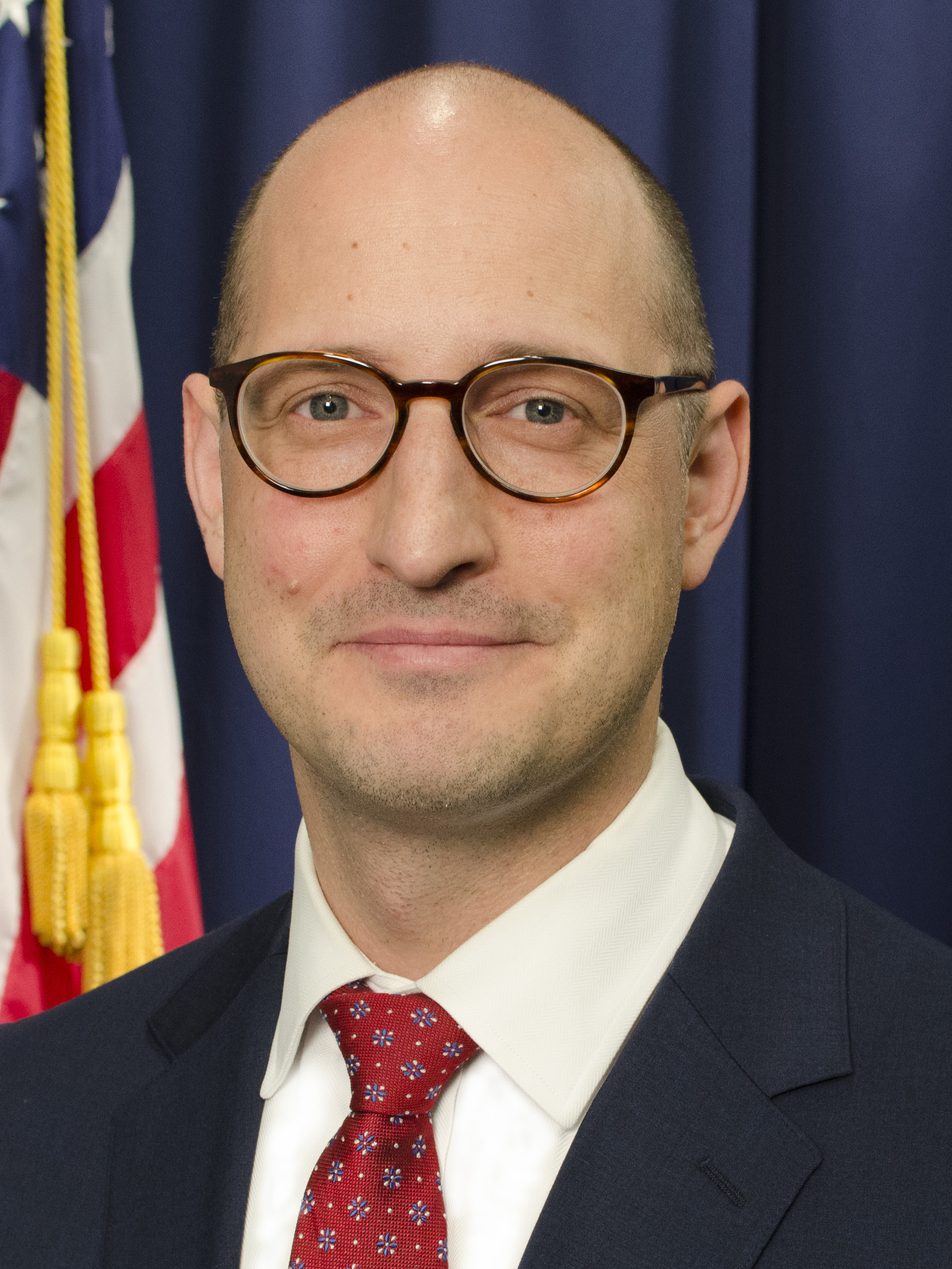
- Official portrait, 2018

Commissioner of the Federal Trade Commission
- In office May 2, 2018 – October 14, 2022
- President: Donald Trump; Joe Biden
- Preceded by: Julie Brill
- Succeeded by: Andrew N. Ferguson

Personal details
- Born: August 3, 1978 (age 46); Boston, Massachusetts, U.S.
- Political party: Republican
- Education: Dartmouth College (BA); Stanford University (JD)

Noah Joshua Phillips (born August 3, 1978) is an American attorney who served on the Federal Trade Commission (FTC) from 2018 to 2022. Phillips was appointed to this position in 2018 by President Donald Trump, and was confirmed unanimously by the U.S. Senate. During the Biden administration, Phillips was one of two Republicans on the FTC, along with fellow commissioner Christine S. Wilson.

After leaving the FTC, Phillips joined the law firm Cravath, Swaine & Moore as the co-leader of its antitrust practice.

== Education and early career ==
Phillips was born on August 3, 1978, in Boston, Massachusetts. He graduated from Dartmouth College in 2000 with a Bachelor of Arts, magna cum laude. He later attended Stanford Law School, receiving a Juris Doctor in 2005.

After graduating from law school, Phillips began his career at New York-based investment bank Wasserstein Perella & Co. Phillips previously clerked for Judge Edward C. Prado during his tenure on the Court of Appeals for the Fifth Circuit. Phillips later worked as a litigator at Cravath, Swaine & Moore LLP in New York and Steptoe & Johnson LLP in Washington, D.C.

== Government career ==
From 2011, Phillips worked in the office of Senator John Cornyn (R-TX), where he advised on matters of antitrust and constitution law as well as consumer privacy and intellectual property (IP) policy. Cornyn praised Trump's decision to nominate Phillips to serve on the FTC in 2018, stating that Phillips “will be a big asset to the commission.” Phillips was sworn in on May 2, 2018, filling a position on the FTC left vacant by Julie Brill's resignation over two years prior.

Phillips resigned from office on October 14, 2022. Following his tenure on the FTC, Phillips joined law firm Cravath, Swaine & Moore as a partner.
