= Anna Sofaer =

American archaeologist

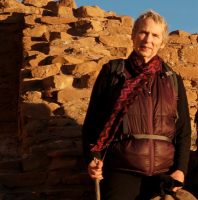
Anna Sofaer

Anna Sofaer (born November 20, 1940) is an American researcher and educator on the archaeoastronomy of the Ancestral Puebloans of the American Southwest and other ancient cultures. In 1977, she "rediscovered" the astronomical marker site known as the Sun Dagger on Fajada Butte in Chaco Culture National Historical Park. Research has indicated this site records the solar and lunar cycles.

In 1978, she founded the non-profit Solstice Project, through which she has produced a book of peer-reviewed research papers and two documentary, PBS broadcast films on Chaco Canyon. She continues to produce research and films from Santa Fe, New Mexico, where the Solstice Project is based.

== Life and education ==
Sofaer was born on November 20, 1940, in Philadelphia, PA, where she grew up. She graduated from Sarah Lawrence College in 1962, where she met scholar of mythology Joseph Campbell. He became a research adviser when she founded the Solstice Project. Working previously in social planning, community organization, housing opportunity initiatives, and as an artist, she developed an interest in Maya astronomy, leading to her documentation of Southwestern pictographs and petroglyphs.

She married Michael Pertschuk in 1977.

== Solstice Project ==
=== Rediscovery of the Sun Dagger ===
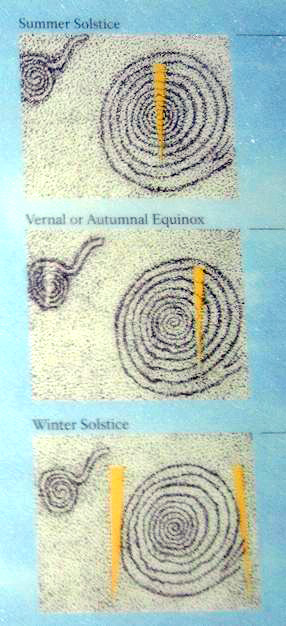
Fajada Butte Sun Dagger Diagram

In 1977 Sofaer visited Chaco Canyon as a volunteer recording ancient Southwestern American rock art. She chanced to record petroglyphs on Fajada Butte at what is now called the Sun Dagger or Three Slab site, now perhaps the most famous site in Chaco Canyon, located at a southeastern facing cliff near the top of Fajada Butte. The three large stone slabs leaning against the cliff channeled light and cast shadow so as to create light "dagger" markings on two spiral petroglyphs on the cliff wall. "We happened to get there near noon, a week from solstice, and a dagger of light was bisecting the spiral." Her research has since indicated this site to likely have been a calendrical shrine, marking the sun's varying heights at solstices and equinoxes, and the moon's rise over its 18.6 year standstill cycle.

=== Research and films ===
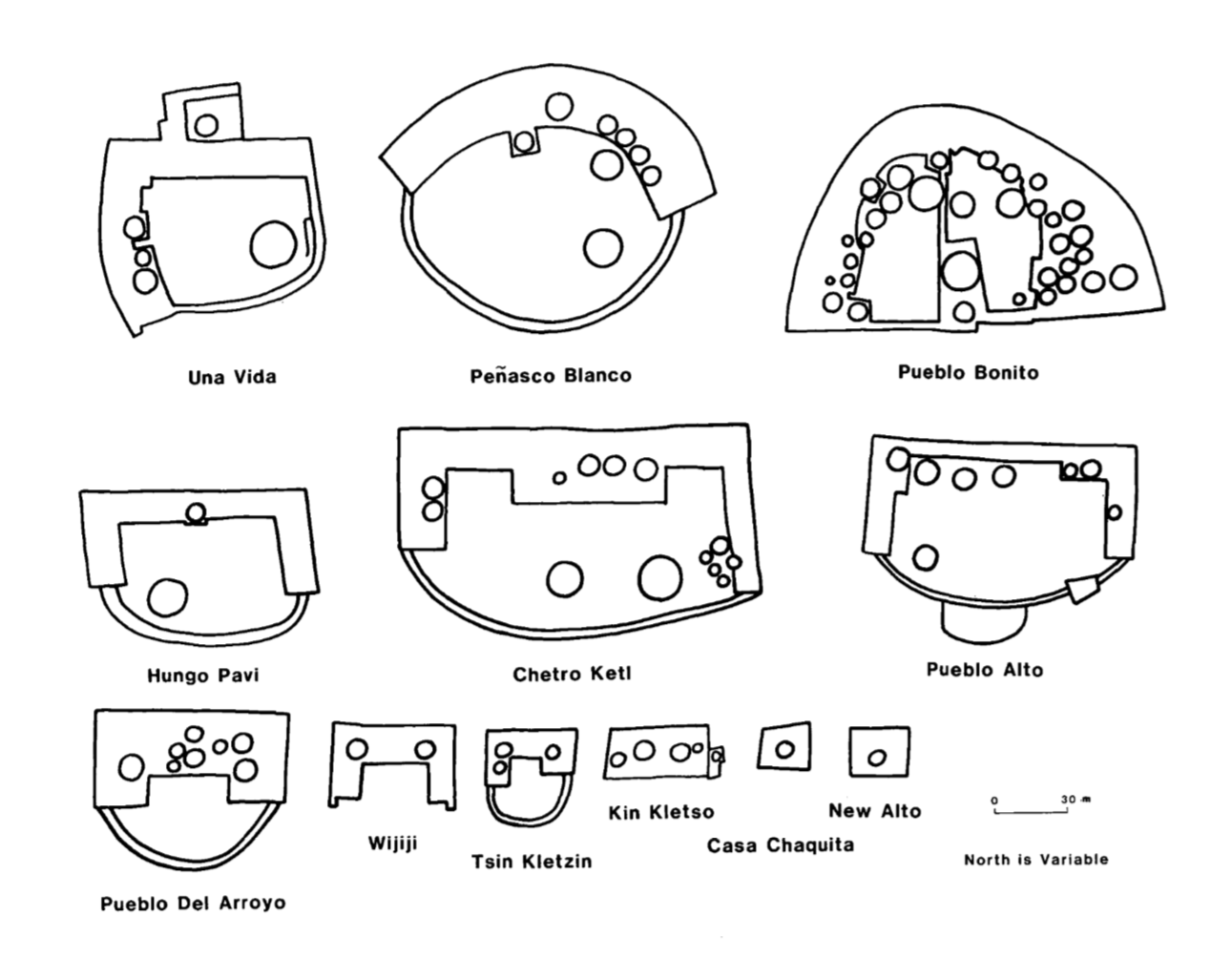
Major Ruins of Chaco Canyon

In 1978, Sofaer founded the 501(c) organization Solstice Project. The purposes of the organization are research, preservation, and education regarding the ancient Chaco culture of the Four Corners region. The Solstice Project's research initially focused on the Sun Dagger site, with research collaborators including physicist Rolf Sinclair (NSF), astronomer LeRoy Doggett (USNO), architect Volker Zinser, archaeologist R. Gwinn Vivian, and anthropologist and MacArthur Fellow, Alfonso Ortiz of the Tewa Ohkay Owingeh, New Mexico Pueblo. The Solstice Project expanded its studies to include surveys, in collaboration with Phillip Tuwaletstiwa and other geodesists of the National Geodetic Survey of the National Oceanic and Atmospheric Administration, of the orientations of the Chacoan Great Houses and the Great North Road. In 2008, Sofaer's peer-reviewed research papers to date were compiled and published as Chaco Astronomy: An Ancient American Cosmology, by Ocean Tree Books.

Some archaeologists were initially skeptical of the role of the moon in ancient monuments but Sofaer's work in general has been met with praise from such groups as the American Association for the Advancement of Science, National Geographic, archaeologists such as Timothy Pauketat and Stephen Lekson and the American Southwest's Native American communities. Her research has also been presented in astronomy textbooks and encyclopedias

The Solstice Project's films to date are The Sun Dagger (1982) and The Mystery of Chaco Canyon (1999), both narrated by Robert Redford and broadcast by PBS.

== Awards and recognition ==
As well as being featured in books for children, Sofaer was ceremonially recognized with a day of honor by her hometown of Santa Fe, New Mexico.
