= Youth Activism Project =

The Youth Activism Project (YAP), founded in 1992, is an international non-partisan organization designed "to encourage young people to speak up and pursue lasting solutions to problems they care deeply about." YAP has various projects and focuses on online activism. Formerly called Activism 2000 Project, the organization provides a variety of resources, training, and advocacy to promote youth civic engagement around the world.

== Structure ==
Wendy Schaetzel Lesko is the President of the Youth Activism Project and co-founder Anika Manzoor is the Executive Director. This nonprofit organization is governed by a Board of Directors which includes five teen activists who have full voting rights.

== Activities ==
This nonpartisan clearinghouse offers free information, resource-sharing and networking for young people who seek to pursue community change, such as changing a school board or city council policy. Trainings and consulting with adult organizations that seek to partner as equals with young people is another area of activity. Various publications include "Youth! The 26% Solution," "Girls Gone Activist: How to Change the World through Education," and "Catalyst! Successful Strategies to Empower Young Advocates."

Some of the online activism projects include topics such as interview-based studies to find out how often young people engage in flash activism, as well as topics like the consequences of online social activity's.

=== International initiatives ===
The Youth Activism Project's flagship initiative is called School Girls Unite which concluded after 15 years. This youth-driven initiative, founded in 2004, had 13 chapters in Washington, D.C. area middle and high schools, collaborating with another group of high school and university students in Mali called Les Filles Unies pour l'Education. Together these African and American activists advocated for gender equity and universal education. They raised donations and provided scholarships to 40 girls living in extreme poverty in Mali to attend school in their villages . Les Filles Unies made regular trips to the schools to hold meetings with the village elders, teachers, parents and the younger students. This firsthand knowledge and youth-led evaluation increased their credibility when these young people—who are not yet old enough to vote—meet with government officials such as the Ministry of Education in Mali and Members of Congress. Ongoing participation with the Global Campaign for Education has seen an increase in the US government's assistance for basic education for children in developing countries from $400 million in 2005 to $740 million in 2008.

== Recognition ==
The Youth Activism Project has been recognized by youth industry publications such as Youth Today, national organizations including the American Legacy Foundation and Points of Light Foundation, and from foundations
