= Fajada Gap =

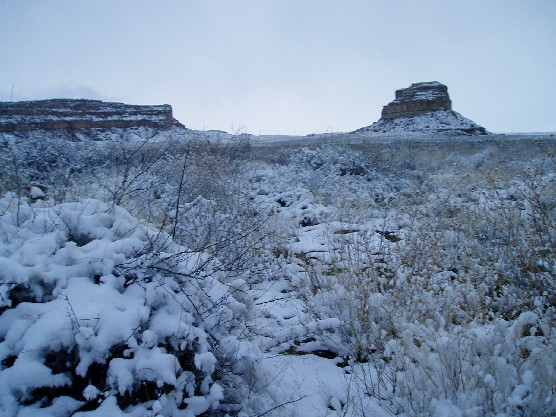
- Fajada Butte and Fajada Gap

- Location within New Mexico

Location
- Location: San Juan County, New Mexico, United States
- Coordinates: 36°01′08″N 107°54′35″W
- Topo map: USGS Pueblo Bonito

Fajada Gap

Geology
- Rock age: Cretaceous
- Mountain type: Sandstone rock

The Fajada Gap is a geographical feature in the southwestern portion of Chaco Canyon, which is part of the Chaco Culture National Historical Park located in the U.S. state of New Mexico. Surrounding Fajada Butte, it consists of a conspicuous gap penetrating the Chacra Mesa, which comprises much of the southwestern cliff faces hemming Chaco Canyon. Fajada Gap has historically helped funnel summer and winter thunderstorms and accompanying precipitation into the Chaco Canyon area.
