= Michael Pertschuk =

American lawyer and advocate (1933–2022)

Commissioner of the Federal Trade Commission
- In office April 21, 1977 – October 15, 1984
- President: Jimmy Carter; Ronald Reagan
- Succeeded by: Mary Azcuenaga

Personal details
- Born: January 12, 1933 London, England
- Died: November 16, 2022 (aged 89) Santa Fe, New Mexico, U.S.
- Spouse: Anna Sofaer (m. 1977)

Michael Pertschuk (January 12, 1933 – November 16, 2022) was an American attorney and advocate for consumer protection and public health. He served as a member of the Federal Trade Commission (FTC) from 1977 to 1984, and served as FTC Chair from 1977 to 1981. During his tenure, Pertschuk worked to strengthen the FTC's consumer protection powers.

Prior to joining the FTC, Pertschuk worked on Capitol Hill, where he was nicknamed the "101st Senator" owing to his influence in passing consumer protection legislation. Pertschuk served as chief counsel and staff director to the Senate Committee on Commerce, Science and Transportation from 1965 to 1976 and was instrumental in drafting the landmark legislation requiring cigarette warning labels and banning broadcast advertising of tobacco products. He also helped pass automobile and product safety laws and the Magnuson–Moss Warranty Act.

== Early life and education ==
Pertschuk was born on January 12, 1933, in London, United Kingdom. Pertschuk earned his Bachelor of Arts from Yale University in 1954 and was a member of the Manuscript Society.

Pertschuk served with an artillery unit in the United States Army from 1954 to 1956, reaching the rank of First Lieutenant. In 1957 he became an assistant in instruction at Yale Law School, receiving his Juris Doctor from Yale Law School in 1959. He was admitted to the Oregon bar in 1959.

== Career ==
=== Early career ===
From 1959 to 1960, Pertschuk was a law clerk for United States District Court Judge Gus J. Solomon, Portland, Oregon. From 1960 to 1962, he was an Associate in the law firm Hart, Rockwood, Davies, Biggs & Strayer, of Portland, Oregon. From 1962 to 1964 he was a legislative assistant for Senator Maurine B. Neuberger of Oregon.

=== Senate Commerce Committee ===
From 1964 to 1968 he worked as counsel for the Senate Commerce Committee. From 1968 to 1977, he was Chief counsel and staff director for the Senate Commerce Committee.

During his time working as a Senate staffer, he, along with a few others, occupied "the top stratum of an invisible network of staff power and influence in the Senate, with impact on the life of every citizen of the United States", according to a 1977 article in the Washington Post.

Pertschuk was an early opponent of the tobacco industry. In the 1960s, he helped draft legislation that required warning labels on cigarette packages stating: "Caution: Cigarette Smoking May Be Hazardous to Your Health." He also worked on legislation that banned cigarette advertising from television and radio.

After the publication of Ralph Nader's 1965 book Unsafe at Any Speed: The Designed-In Dangers of the American Automobile Pertschuk and Nader collaborated on automobile safety. Pertschuk helped ensure the 1966 passage of the National Traffic and Motor Vehicle Safety Act, which established automobile safety standards.

Pertschuk helped to pass the 1972 Consumer Product Safety Act, which established the Consumer Product Safety Commission. He also helped pass the 1975 Magnuson-Moss Act, which regulated warranties on consumer products.

=== Federal Trade Commission ===
President Jimmy Carter appointed him as Chairman of the Federal Trade Commission in 1977. He relinquished that position in 1981 following the election of Ronald Reagan as president, but remained a Commissioner of the FTC through 1984.

=== Late career ===
In 1982, he published Revolt Against Regulation: The Rise and Pause of the Consumer Movement.

In 1984, he was one of the co-founders of the Advocacy Institute in Washington, D.C.; he also served as its co-director and later became a director emeritus.

He founded the Smoking Control Advocacy Resource Center, which, as part of the Advocacy Institute, provided guides, training, strategic counseling, and other resources to combat the tobacco industry. He was instrumental in developing GLOBALink, the primary communication tool for the international tobacco control movement.

From 1984 to 1985, he was a Fellow of the Woodrow Wilson International Center for Scholars in Washington, D.C. In 1985, Pertschuk was elected to the Common Cause National Governing Board.

In 1989, with Wendy Schaetzel, he published The People Rising: The Campaign Against the Bork Nomination.

In 2001, he published Smoke in Their Eyes: Lessons in Movement Leadership from the Tobacco Wars (about the failure of the 1997 settlement leading to the weaker 1998 Tobacco Master Settlement Agreement).

The papers of Michael Pertschuk are available at the United States Library of Congress. They span the years 1949–2002, with the majority of the papers concentrated from 1977 through 2001. They focus on Pertschuk's work in the arena of consumer protection and consist of two parts processed at different times. Part I relates primarily to Pertschuk's career in the Federal Trade Commission (FTC). Part II focuses primarily on his writing projects and his work in the field of public interest lobbying and as a tobacco control advocate in the years following his departure from the FTC.

== Awards and honors ==
In 2003, Pertschuk received a career service award from the American Cancer Society.

On May 1, 2013, he received the Champion Award from the Campaign for Tobacco Free Kids for his five decades of leadership in the fight against tobacco.

== Personal life and death ==
Pertschuk married Carleen Joyce Dooley in 1954; they divorced in 1976. He married Anna Sofaer in 1977.

Pertschuk died of pneumonia at his home in Santa Fe, New Mexico, on November 16, 2022, at age 89.

== Publications ==
=== Books ===
- Revolt Against Regulation: The Rise and Pause of the Consumer Movement (University of California Press, 1983)
- Giant Killers (1986)
- With Wendy Schaetzel: The People Rising: The Campaign Against the Bork Nomination (1989)
- Smoke in Their Eyes: Lessons in Movement Leadership from the Tobacco Wars (2001), ISBN 9780826513939
- The DeMarco Factor: Transforming Public Will into Political Power (2010) regarding the work of Vincent DeMarco

== See also ==
- List of former FTC commissioners
