= Julie Brill =

American lawyer

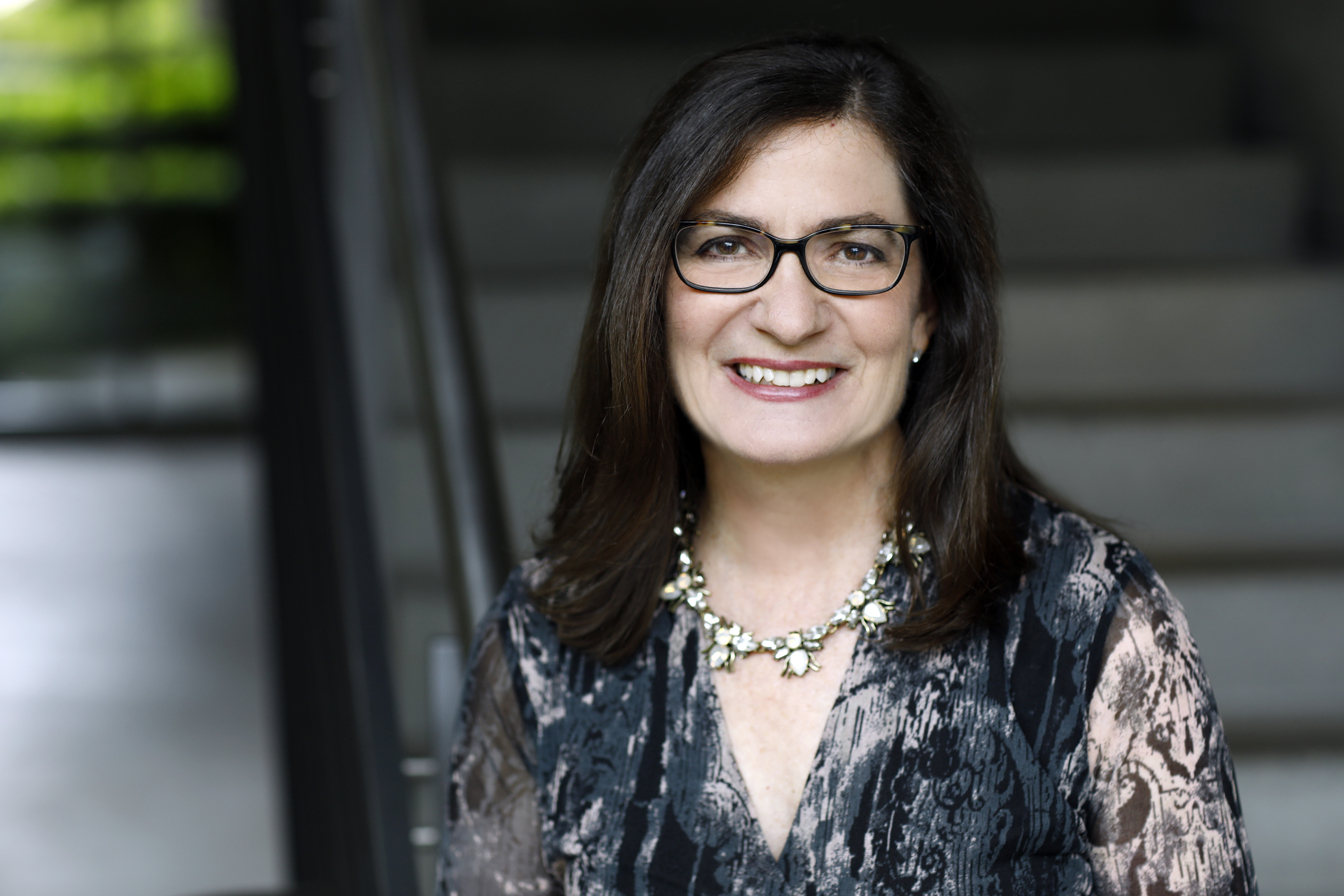
- Brill at Microsoft's Redmond campus, July 2017

Commissioner of the Federal Trade Commission
- In office April 6, 2010 – March 31, 2016
- President: Barack Obama
- Preceded by: Pamela Jones Harbour
- Succeeded by: Noah J. Phillips

Personal details
- Born: Julie Simone Brill; March 12, 1959 (age 67) Houston, Texas, U.S.
- Education: Princeton University (BA); New York University School of Law (JD)

Julie Simone Brill (born March 12, 1959) is an American lawyer who is Chief Privacy Officer and Corporate Vice President for Global Privacy, Safety and Regulatory Affairs at Microsoft. Prior to her role at Microsoft, Brill was nominated by President Barack Obama on November 16, 2009, and confirmed unanimously by the US Senate to serve as Commissioner of the US Federal Trade Commission on March 3, 2010. Brill was a Commissioner of the Federal Trade Commission (FTC) from 2010 to 2016.

== Early life and education ==
Brill was born in Houston, Texas on March 12, 1959. In 1977, Brill graduated from Columbia High School in Maplewood, New Jersey, and was later inducted into the school's hall of fame in 2012. Brill graduated magna cum laude with a bachelor's degree (B.A.) in economics from Princeton University. In 1985, she received her Juris Doctor (J.D.) degree from the New York University School of Law as a Root-Tilden-Kern scholar.

== Government career ==
=== Offices of State Attorneys General ===
From 1988 to 2008, Brill served in the Vermont Attorney General's office as Assistant Attorney General for Consumer Protection and Antitrust. She worked to coordinate with other states as co-chair of the Privacy Working Group at the National Association of Attorneys General. In 1991, she and her staff discovered hundreds of Vermont residents were incorrectly identified as having tax liens against them by a consumer credit reporting agency, leading to a major settlement with the credit reporting industry. Brill testified in Congress about these issues, and ultimately the Fair Credit Reporting Act was revised in 1996 based on problems discovered by Brill and others.

From 2008-2010, Brill was Deputy Attorney General in charge of Consumer Protection and Competition in North Carolina, serving under then-Attorney General Roy Cooper.

=== Federal Trade Commission (FTC) ===
In 2009, President Barack Obama nominated Brill to replace Pamela Jones Harbour as a member of the Federal Trade Commission (FTC). Brill was unanimously confirmed by the Senate on March 3, 2010, and she was officially sworn in on April 6, 2010. While at the FTC, Brill focused on the privacy implications of emerging technologies, including how personal data is gathered and used.

During her tenure on the FTC, Brill actioned against technology companies for failing to secure personal data properly and supported additional protection for consumer data rights. Brill advocated for the development of a "do not track" feature to allow Internet users to tell websites to stop tracking their online activities, and created a "Reclaim Your Name" project to encourage more transparency within the data broker industry. In 2014 she appeared on CBS 60 Minutes to discuss the data broker industry and what needs to change to provide more control for consumers.

Commissioner Brill advocated for effective antitrust enforcement in the healthcare and high-tech sectors. She wrote the Commission’s unanimous decision in ProMedica, dissolving the merger of two hospitals in Toledo, Ohio. Commissioner Brill’s ProMedica decision was upheld on appeal by the U.S. Court of Appeals for the Sixth Circuit. She also dissented from the Commission’s decision to allow two Pharmacy Benefit Manager companies to merge because the merger would likely increase the cost of healthcare, an issue that the FTC began to investigate in 2023.

Additional matters that Brill was involved in at the FTC included the $22.5 million settlement with Google over its circumvention of Safari browser privacy settings in 2012, the $1.2 billion settlement with Teva Pharmaceuticals over its pay-for-delay agreements with generic drug makers in 2015, and the $1 billion settlement with Qualcomm over its anticompetitive licensing practices in 2019.

Brill also led the development of several policy initiatives and reports at the FTC, including The Data Broker report in 2014, The Internet of Things report in 2015, and The Big Data report in 2016.

Brill left office on March 31, 2016, after serving six years. Her seat was later filled in 2018 by Noah J. Phillips, a Republican.

== Post-government career ==
=== Microsoft ===
In 2017, Julie Brill joined Microsoft as corporate vice president and deputy general counsel for Privacy and Regulatory Affairs. In this role, she led the company's global privacy and regulatory strategy, overseeing Microsoft's compliance with emerging data protection laws such as the European Union's General Data Protection Regulation (GDPR). Later, she became Microsoft's Chief Privacy Officer.

=== Boards ===
Brill serves as a board member of the International Association of Privacy Professionals, a board member of the IAPP AI Governance Center Advisory Board, a board member of the Center for Democracy and Technology, and a Governor for The Ditchley Foundation. She was also elected to the American Law Institute in 2013.

== See also ==
- List of former FTC commissioners
