= Thomas B. Leary =

American politician (1931–2021)

Commissioner of the Federal Trade Commission
- In office November 17, 1999 – December 31, 2005
- President: Bill Clinton; George W. Bush
- Preceded by: Mary L. Azcuenaga
- Succeeded by: J. Thomas Rosch

Personal details
- Born: Thomas Barrett Leary; July 15, 1931 Orange, New Jersey
- Died: May 21, 2021 (age 89)
- Party: Republican
- Spouse: Stephanie Lynn Abbott
- Children: 3
- Education: Princeton University (B.A.); Harvard Law School (J.D.)

Thomas Barrett Leary (July 15, 1931 – May 21, 2021) was an American attorney who served as a member of the Federal Trade Commission (FTC) from November 17, 1999 until his resignation from the body December 31, 2005.

== Education and military service ==
Leary was born July 15, 1931, in Orange, New Jersey. Leary received his undergraduate education from Princeton University, where he graduated with a bachelor's degree in economics in 1952. From 1952 to 1955, Leary served in the United States Navy, where he was an Air Intelligence Officer on active duty. In 1955, Leary enrolled in Harvard Law School, where he was an editor of the Harvard Law Review.

== Legal career ==
Leary began his legal career after receiving his Juris Doctor (J.D.) degree from Harvard Law School in 1958. Leary initially worked at international law firm White & Case in New York, before joining General Motors as the company's assistant general counsel. At General Motors, he was tasked primarily with antitrust, consumer protections, and commercial law matters. In 1983, he became a partner at Hogan & Hartson, where he served until his nomination to the Federal Trade Commission (FTC) in 1999.

In 1999, he was nominated by President Bill Clinton to serve as a member of the FTC following the resignation of Mary Azcuenaga. Leary was nominated following a recommendation from Senate Majority Leader Trent Lott (R-MS). As a member of the FTC, Leary notably voted in favor of the merger of BP and ARCO following assurances from company executives it would not work to keep gas prices artificially high.

Leary served on the FTC until he resigned from the position on December 31, 2005. Upon his resignation, he was praised by FTC Chair Deborah Platt Majoras as a "gentle giant in the antitrust world" who conducted himself with the "utmost grace and collegiality". In 2005, he was succeeded in his position by antitrust attorney J. Thomas Rosch.

Following his tenure at the FTC, Leary remained active in private practice. In 2013, Leary wrote an op-ed for USA Today, where he praised the FTC's decision to close its antitrust investigation into search engine company Google. Watchdog group Public Citizen criticized the publication of this article over ethical concerns, noting that Leary had represented Google in private practice. Leary was a critic of rigid partisanship in the field of antitrust policy, stating:

"There really is no such thing as a “Republican” or a “Democratic” antitrust agenda today. People may have different views on the facts of individual cases for a variety of reasons, but there is a broad mainstream consensus on the basic approach to antitrust issues."

== Personal life ==
Leary was married to Stephanie Lynn Abbott, with whom he had three children. Leary died on May 21, 2021, at the age of 89.
