= Fajada Butte =

Butte in New Mexico, United States

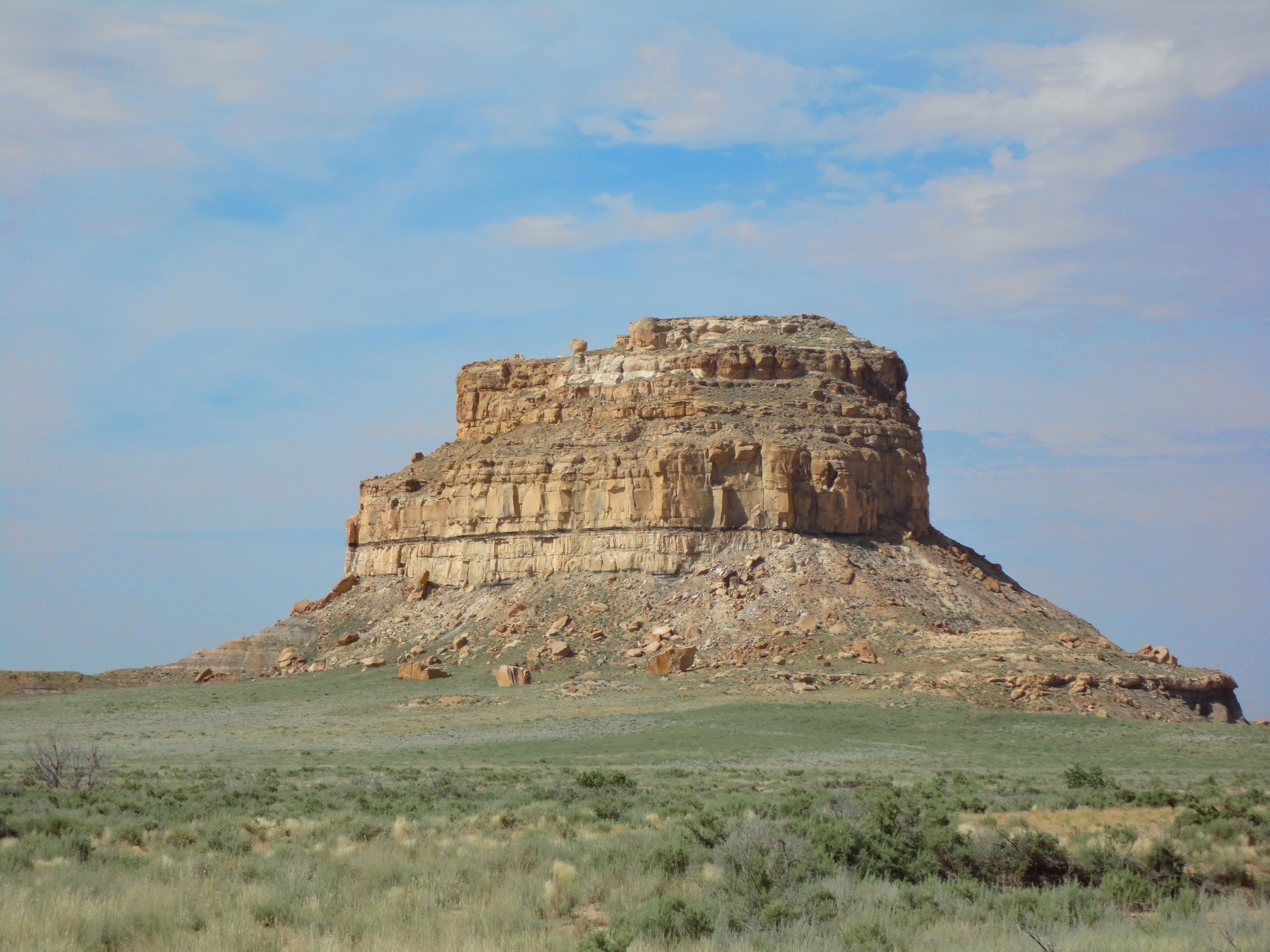
- Fajada Butte mid-morning

Highest point
- Elevation: 6,623 ft (2,019 m) NGVD 29
- Coordinates: 36°01′08″N 107°54′35″W

Geography
- Location within New Mexico
- Location: San Juan County, New Mexico, U.S.
- Topo map: USGS Pueblo Bonito

Geology
- Rock age: Cretaceous
- Mountain type: Sandstone

Climbing
- First ascent: circa 850 AD
- Easiest route: closed to visitors

Fajada Butte is a butte in Chaco Culture National Historical Park, in northwest New Mexico.

Fajada Butte (Banded Butte) rises 135 meters above the canyon floor. Although there is no water source on the butte, there are ruins of small cliff dwellings in the higher regions of the butte. Analysis of fragments of pottery found on Fajada show that these structures were used between the 10th to 13th centuries.

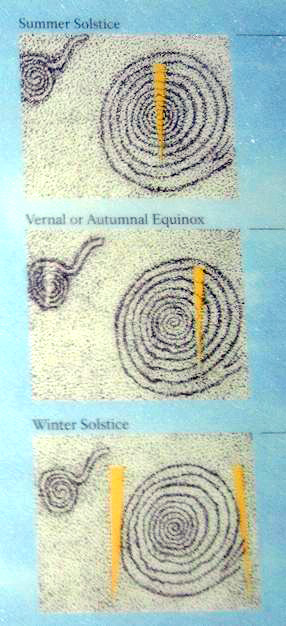
Diagram showing the location of the sun daggers on the petroglyph on various days

The remains of a 95-meter-high, 230-meter-long ramp are evident on the southwestern face of the butte (Ford 1993, p. 478). The magnitude of this building project, without an apparent utilitarian purpose, indicates that Fajada Butte may have had considerable ceremonial importance for the Chacoan people.

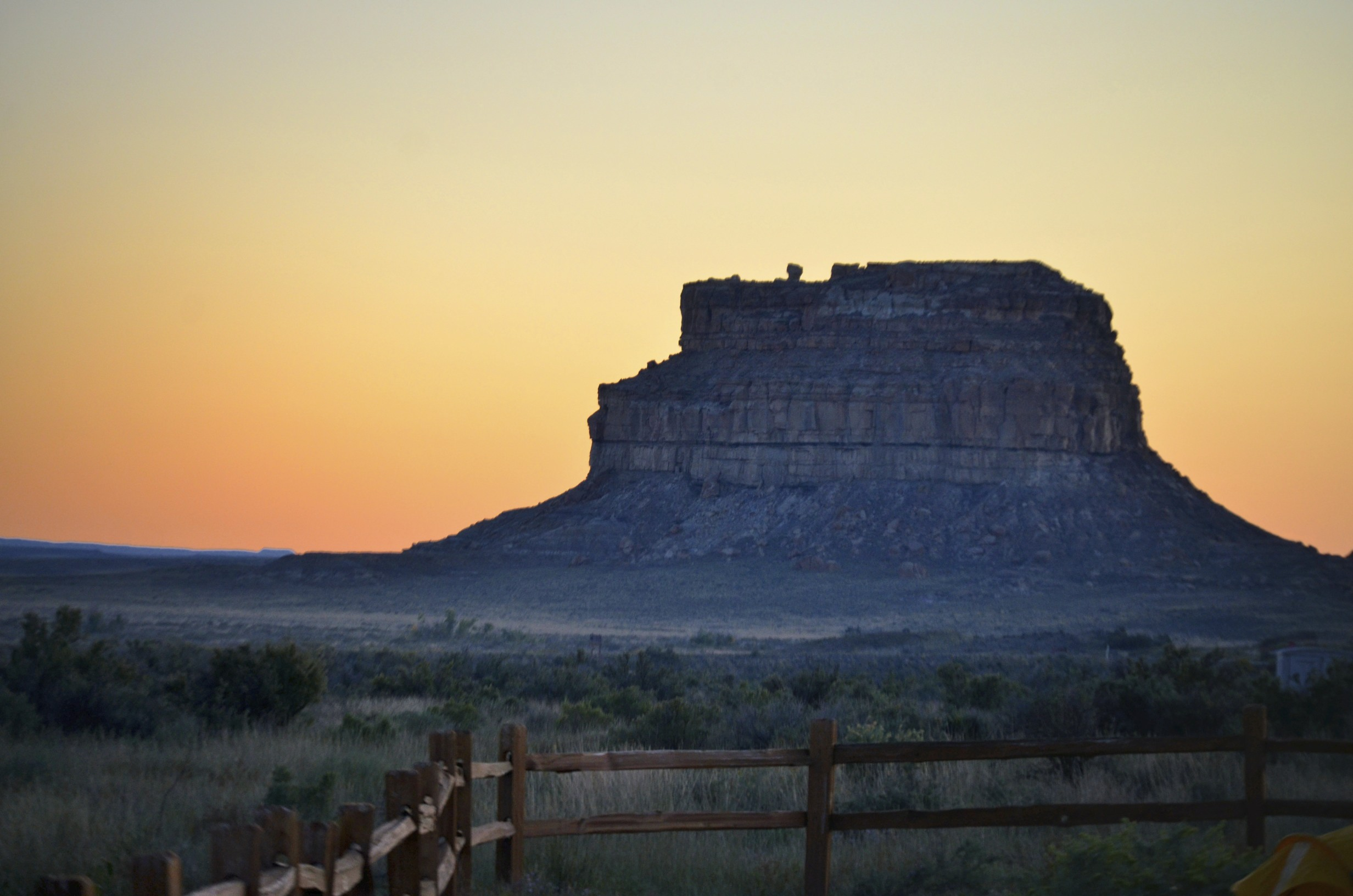
Fajada Butte at sunset in October, 2011

== Sun Dagger site ==
In 1977 the artist Anna Sofaer visited Chaco Canyon as a volunteer recording rock art. There she recorded petroglyphs on Fajada Butte at what is now called the Sun Dagger site, now perhaps the most famous site in Chaco Canyon, located at a southeastern facing cliff near the top of Fajada Butte. She noted three large stone slabs leaning against the cliff which channel light and shadow markings onto two spiral petroglyphs on the cliff wall. On her second visit she saw a "dagger of light" bisecting one of the spirals. At about 11:15 am. on the summer solstice a dagger-shaped light form pierces the larger of the two spirals (Sofaer, Zinser and Sinclair 1979, p. 285). Similar sun daggers mark the winter solstice and equinoxes {Sofaer, Zinser and Sinclair 1979, p. 286} At one extreme in the moon's eighteen- to nineteen-year cycle (the lunar minor standstill), a shadow bisects the larger spiral just as the moon rises; and at its other extreme, nine-and-a-half years later (the lunar major standstill), the shadow of the rising moon falls on the left edge of the larger spiral.(Sofaer, Sinclair and Doggett 1982, p. 43) In each case these shadows align with pecked grooves (Sofaer and Sinclair 1987, pp. 48 – 59). Due to one of the slabs settling, the "dagger of light" no longer crosses through the center of the spiral during the summer solstice. Public access to the butte was curtailed when, in 1989, erosion from modern foot traffic was found to be responsible for one of the three screening slabs at the "Sun Dagger" site shifting out of its ancient position. Because of that shift, the assemblage of stones has lost some of its former spatial and temporal precision as a solar and lunar calendar. In 1990 the screens were stabilized and placed under observation, but the wayward slab was not moved back into its original orientation.

At two other sites on Fajada Butte, located a short distance below the Sun Dagger site, five petroglyphs are also marked by visually compelling patterns of shadow and light that indicate solar noon distinctively at the solstices and equinoxes (Sofaer and Sinclair 1987, p. 59). It has been noted, however, that these five noontime events are essentially the number one would expect by chance (McCluskey 1988, p. S69).

In the 1980s the National Park Service closed off access to the butte due to the delicate nature of the site and the damage and erosion caused by tourism.

Studies by Sofaer's Solstice Project suggest that the major buildings of the ancient Chacoan culture of New Mexico also contain solar and lunar cosmology in three separate articulations: their orientations, internal geometry, and geographic interrelationships were developed in relationship to the cycles of the sun and moon (Sofaer 2007, p. 225).

=== Debate ===
There are several issues surrounding this site. One is when the two spirals were pecked into the walls, some scholars suggesting it "postdates the height of the Chaco tradition". Another is its importance. Although other solar observatories constructed by the Pueblo people predict solar events by the movement of the light over a period of time, this one does not. It has also been suggested that it was not built but that those who made the inscriptions were using a convenient existing fall of rock (Kantner 2004, p. 99).

Critics generally agree that the light and shadow phenomena at the site were intended to mark the arrival of the sun at the solstices and equinoxes (Carlson 1987, pp. 86–7; Zeilik 1985, p. S84). There is less agreement on the lunar phenomena; Michael Zeilik found no ethnographic evidence for a concern with the lunar standstill cycle in the historic pueblos (Zeilik 1985, pp. S80-4). He also noted that contemporary pueblo horizon observations achieve greater precision than that possible using the sun-dagger site, leading him to conclude that the Sun Dagger site may have been a sun shrine, but would not have functioned well to regulate the solar calendar (Zeilik 1985, pp. S71, S77–S80).

== See also ==
- Archaeoastronomy
- Fajada Gap
