= Ruth Marcus (journalist) =

American journalist

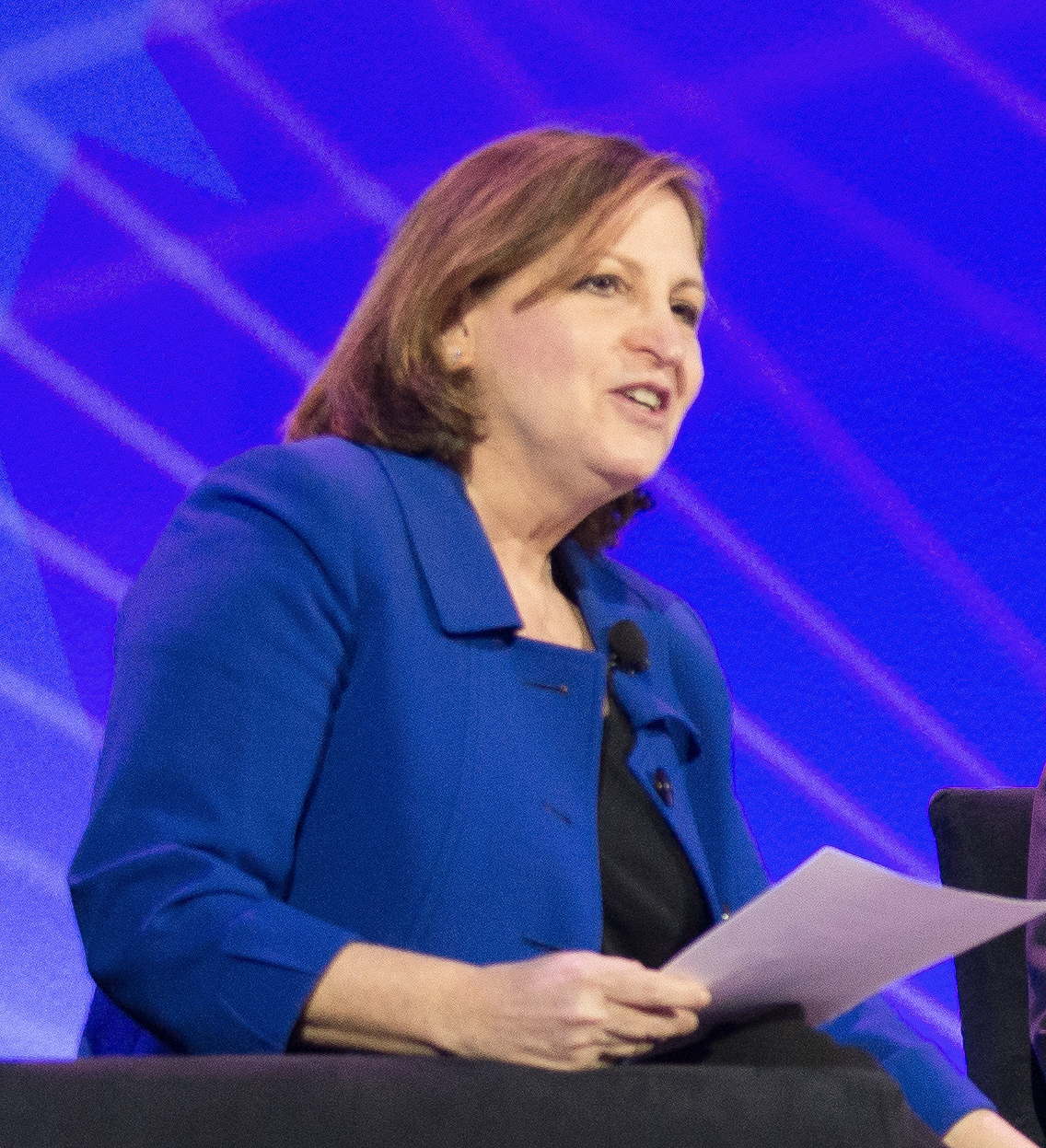
- Marcus in 2016
- Born: Ruth Allyn Marcus; May 15, 1958 (age 68); Philadelphia, Pennsylvania, U.S.
- Education: Yale University (BA); Harvard University (JD)
- Occupations: Journalist, political commentator
- Employer(s): The Washington Post; NBCUniversal, Comcast
- Spouse: Jon Leibowitz
- Children: 2

Ruth Allyn Marcus (born May 15, 1958) is an American political commentator and journalist. She worked for The Washington Post from 1984 to 2025, where she wrote an op-ed column and served as the Deputy Editorial Page Editor for the newspaper. In March 2007, she was a finalist for the Pulitzer Prize for Commentary.

Ideologically and politically, Marcus identifies as a liberal and as a Zionist. She is registered as an Independent.

== Early life and education ==
Marcus was born in Philadelphia in 1958 and grew up in a Jewish family in Livingston, New Jersey. Both her parents were pharmacists. She attended school in Livingston with and has remained a close friend of fellow columnist Mona Charen. She studied at Yale University where she wrote for the college newspaper. After receiving her B.A. degree, Marcus wrote for the National Law Journal, before attending Harvard Law School, from which she received her J.D. degree in 1984.

== Career ==
=== The Washington Post ===
Marcus began writing for The Washington Post while still in law school, and formally joined the paper after graduation.

From her Washington Post biography:

Marcus has been with The Post since 1984. She joined the national staff in 1986, covering campaign finance, the Justice Department, the Supreme Court and the White House. From 1999 through 2002, she served as deputy national editor, supervising reporters who covered money and politics, Congress, the Supreme Court, and other national issues. She joined the editorial board in 2003 and began writing a regular column in 2006.

Marcus resigned on March 10, 2025 after CEO Will Lewis refused to publish an opinion piece that she wrote which was critical of Post owner Jeff Bezos. Two days later, on March 12, she published the spiked opinion piece in full, along with an essay reflecting on her career at the Post and the changes under Bezos's ownership, in The New Yorker.

Marcus is now a contributing writer at The New Yorker.

== Personal life ==
Marcus is married to Jon Leibowitz, who served as chair of the Federal Trade Commission under Barack Obama. The couple have two daughters, Emma and Julia.

== Works ==
- Supreme Ambition: Brett Kavanaugh and the Conservative Takeover, Simon & Schuster (December 3, 2019) ISBN 978-1982123864
