= Online Privacy Alliance =

American business alliance of internet firms

- Abbreviation: OPA
- Formation: 1998; 28 years ago
- Type: Non-profit
- Legal status: Alliance
- Purpose: Industry self regulation alliance for online privacy
- Location: Washington DC, United States
- Region served: United States
- Website: privacyalliance.org

The Online Privacy Alliance (OPA) was an American cross-industry coalition of 81 e-commerce companies and associations. It formed in 1998 with the aim of providing a unified voice for companies in the Internet industry to create a self-regulated privacy policy for the internet and head off government privacy regulation. It was most active between 1998 and 2001 and later saw its members reduce around 30.

== History ==
The Online Privacy Alliance began meeting formally in the spring of 1998. In June, the Alliance announced its creation, membership, mission and guidelines.

The group aimed to lead and support self-regulatory initiatives that "create an environment of trust and ... foster the protection of individuals' privacy online and in electronic commerce." The alliance was an initiative by its member technology companies to avoid privacy legislation by supporting self regulation.

It also aimed to provide a framework for debate and a forum for attracting companies engaged in e-commerce from the technology, telecommunications, publishing, entertainment, marketing, finance, and retail sectors.

The Principles of the Online Privacy Alliance were later used in writing the Principles later created by the Network Advertising Initiative (NAI).

Upon joining the Online Privacy Alliance, each member organization agreed that its policies for protecting individually identifiable information in an online or electronic commerce environment would meet the requirements of the OPA's guidelines, with customization and enhancement as appropriate to its own business or industry sector. The Online Privacy Alliance guidelines included provisions requiring members to notify users of data collection, to disclose privacy policies to users, to receive consent for data collection, and to securely store the data they collected. The Online Privacy Alliance did not monitor compliance with its guideline, instead it called for self-enforcement mechanisms.

While the initial count of membership organizations was 80, this eventually dwindled to around 30.

The alliance appeared to have been most active between 1998 and 2001 when privacy regulations were being discussed by the US Government. The Alliance's last press release appeared to have been issued in November 1999 but its website continued to exist and there were signs of updates on September 1, 2015.

== Members ==
=== Companies ===
- Apple Computer
- AT&T
- AWS Convergence Technologies, Inc.
- Boeing
- Dell
- eBay Inc.
- EDS
- Microsoft
- Nestlé
- PricewaterhouseCoopers
- Time Warner Inc.
- Verizon Communications
- The Walt Disney Company

=== Associations ===
- American Advertising Federation
- Business Software Alliance
- Association of National Advertisers
- American Association of Advertising Agencies
- Information Technology Association of America
- Internet Alliance
- Motion Picture Association of America
- Online Publishers Association, now called Digital Content Next
- TRUSTe
- The United States Chamber of Commerce
