= Matthew Lesko =

American television personality

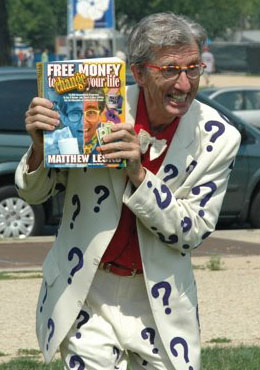
- Lesko in 2007
- Education: Marquette University; American University (MBA)
- Occupation: Author
- Known for: Free Money Books

Matthew Lesko is an American author known for his publications and infomercials on federal grant funding. He has written over twenty books instructing people how to get money from the United States government. Widely recognized for recording television commercials, infomercials, and interviews in colorful suits decorated with question marks, Lesko's signature fashion also extends into his daily attire and transportation, earning him the nickname Question Mark Guy.

== Life and career ==
Lesko grew up in Wilkes-Barre, Pennsylvania. He is of Slovak descent. Lesko received his undergraduate degree from Marquette University in Milwaukee. Upon graduation he was commissioned as an officer in the Navy. In the Navy, he served as a navigator aboard the USS Oxford in the South China Sea during the Vietnam War. When Lesko returned he earned a master's degree in business administration (MBA) from American University in Washington, D.C.

In 1975, Lesko quit his job designing computerized information systems and co-founded Washington Researchers with his then-wife Leila K. Kight.

After a slow start, Lesko started sending out a professional newsletter telling people how to get free information and, by 1979, Washington Researchers employed 30 people in its Washington, D.C. office.

As side lines of business, Lesko began publishing directories for those who preferred to do their own research, such as the Researcher's Guide to Washington, and conducting seminars on the types of information then available from the government.

Lesko was able to interest publisher Viking in his idea to publish a directory of government information sources in 1980. That book, Getting Yours: The Complete Guide to Government Money, was published by Viking's Penguin subsidiary in 1982.

He claims to have researched government grants for over 25 years.

== Criticism ==
Critics claim that Lesko is misleading in his advertisements. A 2004 report by the New York State Consumer Protection Board claimed that most of the grants mentioned in Lesko's books were actually public assistance programs that many people were not eligible for, and that Lesko misrepresented examples of people who had taken advantage of government programs.

The New York Times criticized him for having implied a current association with the paper long after ending a 1992–1994 Times column.

In 2005, Lesko was named #99 in Bernard Goldberg's book 100 People Who Are Screwing Up America because, "He is a symbol for self-centered free-riders."

In an interview with The Washington Post in July 2007, Lesko admitted having assembled his books from government guides to grants and loans, quoting Lesko as saying of his first book "I plagiarized the whole thing" and "I didn't write a lick." Lesko later added "I get stuff for free and I sell it for as much as I can get." But in the last couple paragraphs of the same article, the author cites the names of multiple people who have actually used Lesko's books and teachings to get free money for several different things, everything from having their roof replaced on their home to "a local government program that gave them $12,000 to help pay for a gravel walkway for their cows."

== Books ==
Matthew Lesko's company, Information USA, has published several reference books including:

- Information U.S. (1986, ISBN 0-14-046745-9)
- Getting Yours (1987, ISBN 0-14-046760-2)
- 1001 Free Goodies and Cheapies (1994, ISBN 1-878346-25-3)
- Free College Money, Term Papers, and Sex Ed (1994, ISBN 1-878346-24-5)
- Lesko's Info-Power (1994, ISBN 1-878346-17-2)
- Free Health Care, Free Medical Information and Free Prescription Drugs (1995, ISBN 1-878346-34-2)
- Gobs and Gobs of Free Stuff (1996, ISBN 1-878346-33-4)
- Free Legal Help (1996, ISBN 1-878346-35-0)
- Free Stuff for Busy Moms! (1999, ISBN 1-878346-49-0)
- Free College and Training Money For Women (2000, ISBN 1-878346-52-0)
- Free Money and Help for Women Entrepreneurs (2000, ISBN 1-878346-51-2)
- Free Money For Your Retirement (2000, ISBN 1-878346-60-1)
- Free Stuff for Women's Health, Fitness, and Nutrition (2000, ISBN 1-878346-50-4)
- Free Money To Change Your Life (2001, ISBN 1-878346-40-7)
- Free Money To Pay Your Bills (2003, ISBN 1-878346-65-2)
- Free Money To Get A Better Home (2004, ISBN 1-878346-67-9)
- Free Money To Quit Your Job (2004, ISBN 1-878346-68-7)
- Free Money for Entrepreneurs (2005, ISBN 1-878346-69-5)
- American Benefits for Seniors: Getting the Most Out of Your Retirement (2006, ISBN 1-878346-87-3)

All of his books claim to contain information about how to get free money from the United States government.
