= Pamela Jones Harbour =

American lawyer

Commissioner of the Federal Trade Commission
- In office August 4, 2003 – September 2009
- President: George W. Bush; Barack Obama
- Preceded by: Sheila F. Anthony
- Succeeded by: Julie Brill

Personal details
- Born: Pamela LeDeyce Jones; July 15, 1959 (age 66) New York City, U.S.
- Party: Independent
- Spouse: John Harbour
- Education: Indiana University School of Music (BM); Indiana University School of Law (JD)

Pamela LeDeyce Jones Harbour (born July 15, 1959) is an American lawyer who served as a member of the Federal Trade Commission (FTC) from 2003 to 2009. As of 2021, Harbour is one of just three African-Americans to have served as a member of the FTC. Additionally, she is one of the just three political independents to serve on the body as of 2017.

As a lawyer, she has worked in field of competition law, consumer protection, information privacy, and data security. While a member of the FTC, she was notably the sole commissioner to dissent from the agency's decision to approve Google's acquisition of DoubleClick. Harbour currently serves as the Legal Officer and Senior Vice President for Global Member Compliance & Privacy at Herbalife Nutrition.

== Early life and education ==
Pamela LeDeyce Jones was born in Queens, New York. Her parents, Joseph Jones, Sr. and Verneta G. Jones, owned a stenography company. She has one brother, Joseph, Jr. After Jones' family relocated to Albany, New York, she graduated from Guilderland Central High School in 1977.

Jones earned her Bachelor of Music from Indiana University School of Music in 1981. She later obtained her Juris Doctor from Indiana University Maurer School of Law in 1984.

== Career ==
=== Office of the New York Attorney General (NYAG) ===
Harbour's early career included serving in the Office of the New York Attorney General (NYAG) for 11 years. In October 1996, she became the Deputy Attorney General of the Public Advocacy Division. While employed by the Office, Harbour prosecuted antitrust and consumer protection violations, including national price-fixing conspiracy cases.

During this period, Harbour served as lead counsel in multi-state cases. In October 1997, Harbour argued before the Supreme Court of the United States on behalf of 35 states in State Oil Co. v. Khan, a resale price maintenance (RPM) case. In 1999, Harbour was appointed Assistant First Deputy Attorney General. After leaving the Office of the NYAG, Harbour worked at Kaye Scholer LLP as an antitrust partner.

=== Federal Trade Commission (FTC) ===
In 2003, Harbour was nominated by President George W. Bush to replace Sheila F. Anthony, whose term expired in September 2002, as a member of the FTC. On August 4, 2003, Harbour was officially sworn in as a member of the FTC, and would serve in the position until her term expired in September 2009.

In 2007, she was the sole commissioner to dissent from the FTC's decision to approve Google's acquisition of DoubleClick. Harbour expressed concerns regarding consumer data privacy. She later wrote an op-ed published by The New York Times, noting Google as the "Web's emperor" due to the company's market dominance in data collection.

Following the expiration of her term in office, President Barack Obama appointed Julie Brill to replace her on the FTC. As of 2021, Harbour is one of just three African-Americans to serve on the FTC: The other two were A. Leon Higginbotham Jr. (served from 1962-1964) and Mozelle W. Thompson (served from 1997-2004). No African-Americans have been appointed to serve on the commission since. Additionally, Harbour is one of the just three political independents to have ever served on the body, along with Philip Elman (who served from 1961 to 1970) and Mary Azcuenaga (who served from 1984 to 1998).

=== Post-FTC career ===
After Harbour left the FTC in 2010, she became a partner in Fulbright & Jaworski L.L.P.’s antitrust and competition practice. She was the head of the firm's Privacy, Competition and Data Protection practice group. In October 2014, Harbour was hired by Herbalife Nutrition as Senior Vice President, Global Member Compliance & Privacy. In February 2016, she became the company's legal officer.

== Personal life ==
Harbour is married to John Harbour, and has three children.

== Awards ==
- Women History Makers, Caribbean Chamber of Commerce & Industry, 1998
- Champion of Freedom Award, Electronic Privacy Information Center, 2010
- Spirit of Excellence Award, The American Bar Association Commission on Racial and Ethnic Diversity in the Profession, 2019

== Published works ==
- Harbour, Pamela Jones and Leibowitz, Jon, Subject Line Labeling as a Weapon Against Spam: A CAN-SPAM Report to Congress, DIANE Publishing, 2005, ISBN 9781428952553

== See also ==
- List of former FTC commissioners
