= Charles W. Hunt =

Charles W. Hunt may refer to:

- Charles Wallace Hunt (1813–1911), American mechanical engineer, inventor and business executive
- Charles W. Hunt (politician) (1864–1938), Iowa politician and Federal Trade Commission chair
- Charles W. Hunt (educator), American educator and academic administrator

== See also ==
- Charles Hunt (disambiguation)
