= Charles H. March =

Chair of the Federal Trade Commission

Charles Hoyt March (c. 1870 – August 28, 1945) was the chair of the Federal Trade Commission from January 1, 1933, to December 31, 1933, again from January 1, 1936, to December 31, 1936, and a third time from January 1, 1941, to December 31, 1941.

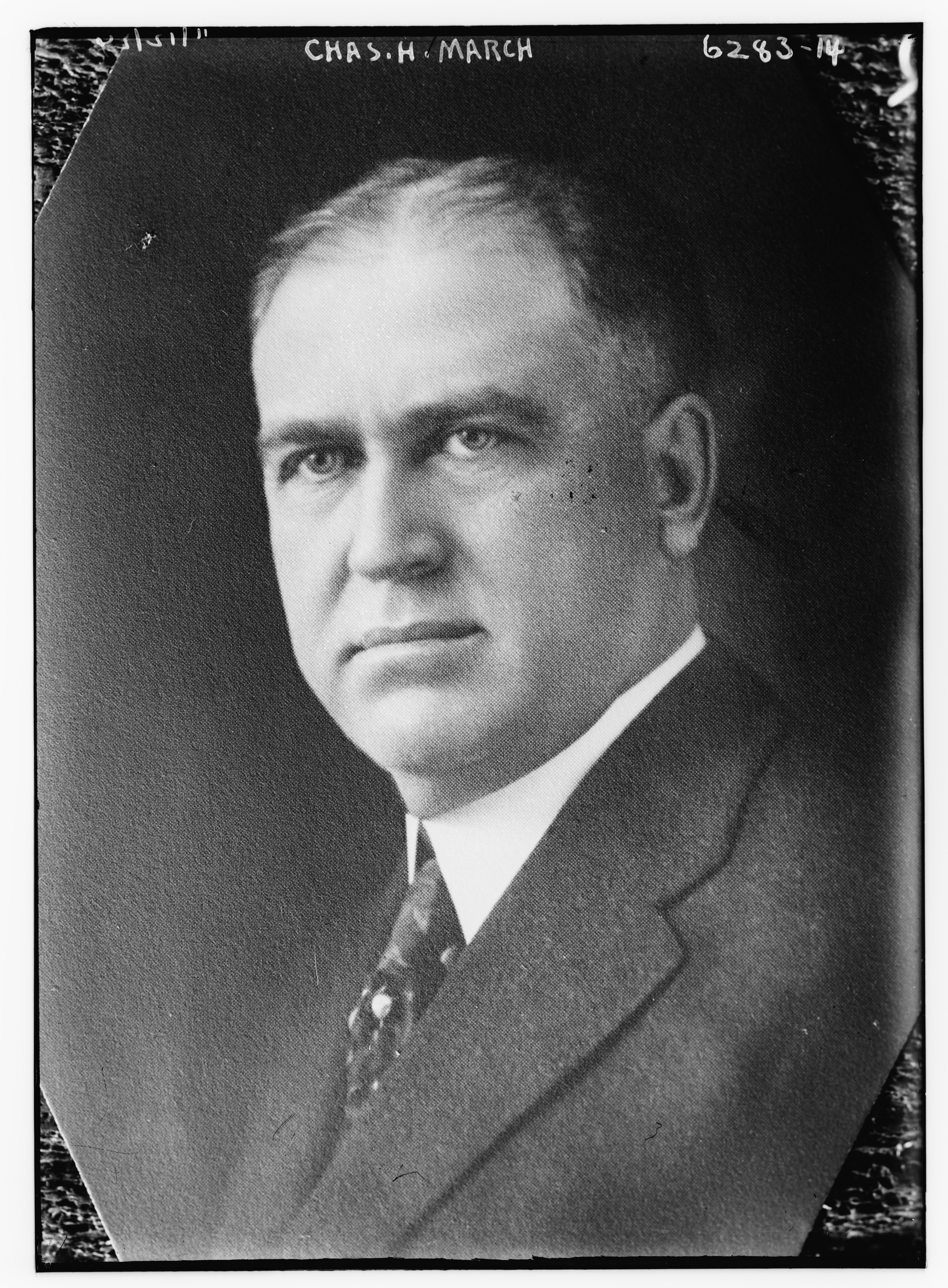
Charles H. March in 1924

March served as Mayor of Litchfield, Minnesota, and president of the Minnesota Farmers and Bankers Council before his appointment to the FTC. He was a delegate to the 1924 Republican National Convention. On January 19, 1929, Myers was nominated by President Calvin Coolidge to a seat on the FTC vacated by the resignation of Abram F. Myers, taking office on February 1, 1929. March served on the FTC for 16 years, until his death at the age of 75.

Political offices
| Preceded by William E. Humphrey; Ewin L. Davis; Ewin L. Davis | Chairmen of the Federal Trade Commission; 1933–1933; 1936–1936; 1941–1941 | Succeeded by Garland S. Ferguson; William Augustus Ayres; William Augustus Ayres |
