= Robert E. Freer =

Federal Trade Commission chair (1896–1963)

Chair of the Federal Trade Commission
- In office January 1, 1948 – December 31, 1948
- President: Harry S. Truman
- Preceded by: Garland Ferguson Jr.
- Succeeded by: Lowell B. Mason
- In office January 1, 1944 – December 31, 1944
- President: Franklin D. Roosevelt
- Preceded by: Garland Ferguson Jr.
- Succeeded by: Ewin L. Davis
- In office January 1, 1939 – December 31, 1939
- President: Franklin D. Roosevelt
- Preceded by: Garland Ferguson Jr.
- Succeeded by: Ewin L. Davis

Personal details
- Born: Robert Elliott Freer; January 30, 1896 Madisonville, Cincinnati, Ohio, U.S.
- Died: January 6, 1963 (aged 66)
- Resting place: Arlington National Cemetery, Arlington County, Virginia, U.S.
- Party: Republican

Military service
- Branch/service: United States Army

Robert Elliott Freer (January 30, 1896 – January 6, 1963) was an American attorney who served as chair of the Federal Trade Commission from January 1, 1939, to December 31, 1939, again from January 1, 1944, to December 31, 1944, and a third time from January 1, 1948, to December 31, 1948.

== Early life and education ==
Robert Elliott Freer was born on January 30, 1896 in Madisonville, Cincinnati, Ohio. He received an LL.B. from the University of Cincinnati College of Law in 1917. He received an LL.M. from the Washington College of Law in 1929.

== Career ==
Freer entered the practice of law in Cincinnati in 1917. He served in the United States Army during World War II in the 324th Infantry Regiment, and was deployed to France.

In 1925, he became an attorney with the Bureau of Valuation within the Interstate Commerce Commission.In 1935, President Franklin D. Roosevelt appointed him as a Republican member of the FTC. He was reappointed to the FTC by President Harry S. Truman in 1948, but resigned later that year to return to the practice of law.

In 1960, he returned to government service as a hearing examiner for the Federal Power Commission

== Honors ==
In 1928, Freer was elected to the Order of the Coif by his alma mater, the University of Cincinnati College of Law.

== Personal life and death ==
Freer married three times. On October 28, 1919, he married Hazel Louise Davis (1898–1975) in Newport, Kentucky. On April 11, 1925, he married Olive Roberts (1898–1973) in Marion County, Ohio. Finally, on September 7, 1939, he married Alice Elizabeth Barry (1905–1979) in McConnellsburg, Pennsylvania. Her father, Edward P. Barry, had been Lieutenant Governor of Massachusetts; she had earned a law degree from the Portia Law School in Boston in 1933. Freer adopted her two daughters and one son from her prior marriage to Harold Wadsworth Sullivan (1896–1969), former Assistant Attorney General for Massachusetts. He and Alice then had a son.

Freer died of multiple myeloma at the age of 66, and was interred at Arlington National Cemetery.

Political offices
Preceded by Garland S. Ferguson; Garland S. Ferguson; Garland S. Ferguson	Chairmen of the Federal Trade Commission; 1939–1939; 1944–1944; 1948–1948	Succeeded by Ewin L. Davis; Ewin L. Davis; Lowell B. Mason

== Bibliography ==
=== References ===
- American Law School Review (The) (December 1928). "Notes and Personals".. 6 (7): 385 – via Google Books. LCCN 2008-247516; OCLC 76883455 (all editions).
- Boston Globe (The) (September 22, 1939). "Ex-Lieut. Gov. Barry's Daughter Weds Freer". Vol. 136, no. 74. p. 22 (column 6, middle) – via Newspapers.com.
- Chicago Tribune (January 7, 1963). "R. E. Freer, Ex-Chairman of FTC, Dies". Vol. 122, no. 6. p. 42 – via Newspapers.com.
- Cincinnati Enquirer (The) (October 29, 1919). "R. E. Freer Wins Bride". Vol. 76, no. 302. p. 7 (column 5, middle) – via Newspapers.com.
- Federal Trade Commission (October 2021). Commissioners, Chairwomen and Chairmen of the Federal Trade Commission (PDF) (timeline)...
- Martindale-Hubbell Law Directory. Vol. 1 (of 3) (90th Annual ed.). 1958. p. 743. LCCN 31-6356; ISSN 0191-0221; OCLC 1645529 (all editions).
- "Robert Elliott Freer". Memoirs of Miami Valley.. Vol. 3 (of 3). Chicago: Robert O. Law Company. 1920. pp. 24–25 – via Google Books. LCCN a-40-507; OCLC 478490 (all editions).
- Washington Post (The); Joyce, Maureen (April 22, 1979). "Alice Barry Freer, Former City Court Official, Dies"..
