= Charles Hunt =

Charles Hunt may refer to:

- Charles Hunt (artist) (1803–1877), English painter
- Charles Cooke Hunt (1833–1868), explorer of Western Australia
- Charles Hunt (American football) (born 1983), American football player
- Charles A. Hunt (California politician) (1896–1978)
- Charles A. Hunt (Wisconsin politician) (1829–1899)
- Charles Edward Hunt (1886–1954), lawyer and politician in Newfoundland
- Charles J. Hunt (1881–1976), American film editor and director
- Charles Wallace Hunt (1813–1911), American mechanical engineer, inventor and business executive
- Charles W. Hunt (politician) (1864–1938), Iowa politician and Federal Trade Commission chair
- Charles W. Hunt (educator) (1880–1973), American educator and academic administrator
- Chuck Hunt (1954–2021), American businessman, teacher and acting first gentleman of Massachusetts
- Charlie Hunt (born 1951), American football player
