= Hier =

Hier is a surname. Notable people with the surname include:

- Ethel Glenn Hier (1889–1971), American composer, teacher and pianist
- Marvin Hier (born 1939), dean and founder of the Simon Wiesenthal Center

== See also ==
- Walter Hiers (1893–1933), American silent film actor
- Filesystem Hierarchy Standard (Linux man page: hier(7))
- Hiers-Brouage, commune in France
- Haier, Chinese home appliances company
