= Garland Ferguson Jr. =

Federal Trade Commission chair (1878–1963)

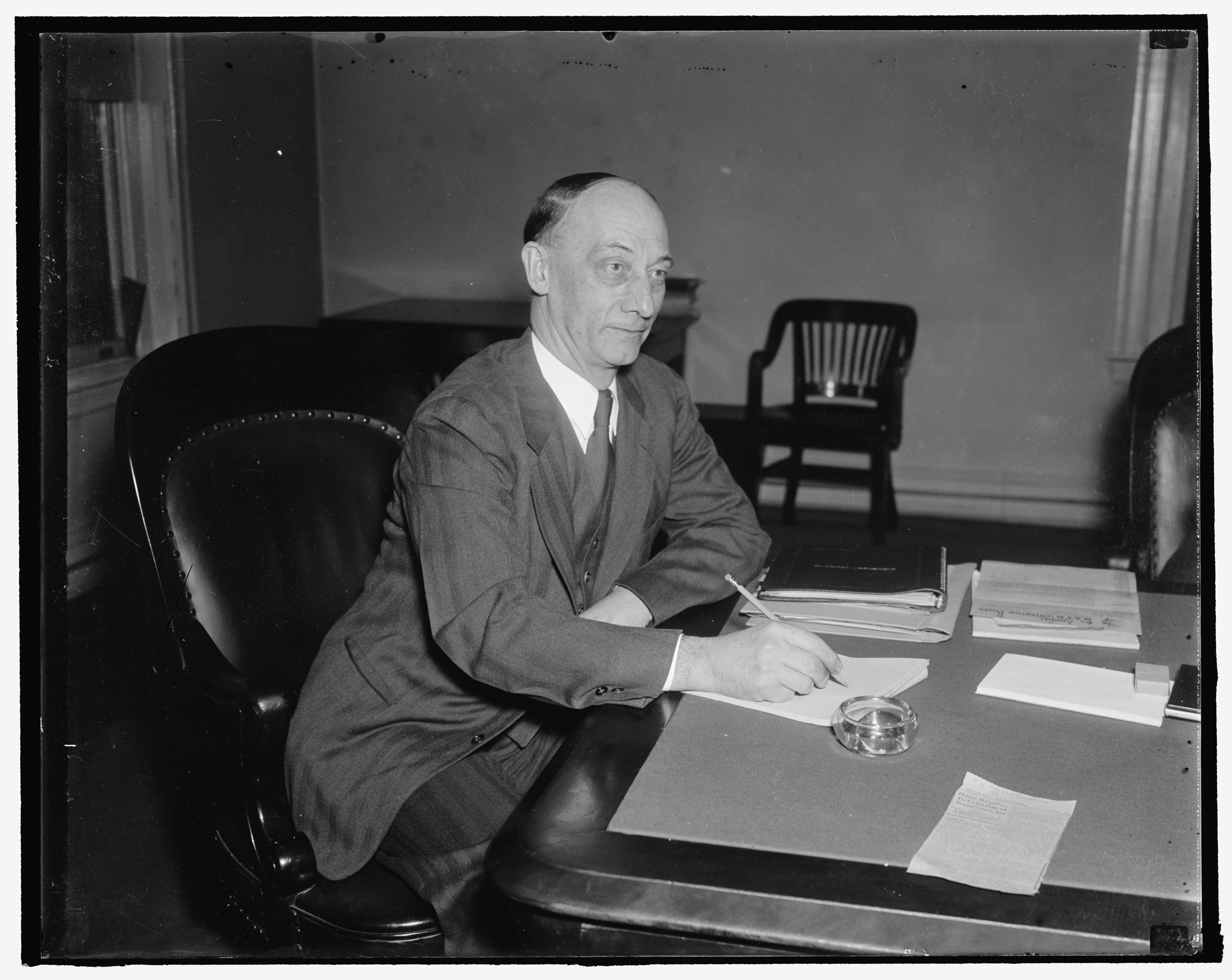
- Ferguson in 1938

Chair of the Federal Trade Commission
- In office January 1, 1947 – December 31, 1947
- President: Harry S. Truman
- Preceded by: William Augustus Ayres
- Succeeded by: Robert E. Freer
- In office January 1, 1943 – December 31, 1943
- President: Franklin D. Roosevelt
- Preceded by: William Augustus Ayres
- Succeeded by: Robert E. Freer
- In office January 1, 1938 – December 31, 1938
- President: Franklin D. Roosevelt
- Preceded by: William Augustus Ayres
- Succeeded by: Robert E. Freer
- In office January 1, 1934 – December 31, 1934
- President: Franklin D. Roosevelt
- Preceded by: Charles H. March
- Succeeded by: Ewin L. Davis
- In office January 1, 1930 – December 30, 1930
- President: Herbert Hoover
- Preceded by: Edgar A. McCulloch
- Succeeded by: Charles W. Hunt

Personal details
- Born: Garland Sevier Ferguson Jr. May 30, 1878 Waynesville, North Carolina, U.S.
- Died: April 13, 1963 (aged 84) Washington, D.C., U.S.
- Party: Democratic
- Spouse: Margaret Merrimon (m. 1907)
- Children: 3

Garland Sevier Ferguson Jr. (May 30, 1878 – April 13, 1963) was an American politician who served as the chair of the Federal Trade Commission (FTC) for five separate one-year stints over a seventeen-year period, from January 1, 1930 to December 30, 1930, from January 1, 1934 to December 31, 1934, from January 1, 1938 to December 31, 1938, from January 1, 1943 to December 31, 1943, and from January 1, 1947 to December 31, 1947.

== Career ==
Born in Waynesville, North Carolina, Ferguson attended the University of North Carolina from September 1894 to April 1895, and then briefly attended the United States Naval Academy at Annapolis, Maryland, returning to North Carolina to receive a law degree from the University of North Carolina School of Law in 1900. During World War I, he was an assistant general counsel of the Newport News Shipbuilding and Dry Dock Company.

On November 12, 1927, President Calvin Coolidge appointed Ferguson to a seat on the FTC, pursuant to the recommendation of Coolidge confidante C. Bascom Slemp and other southern leaders who sought to have a southerner named to the Commission. Ferguson remained on the FTC for 22 years, serving as chair of the agency for five periods during this time, and retiring on November 15, 1949.

== Personal life and death ==
In 1907, Ferguson married Margaret Merrimon, with whom he had three children.

Ferguson died in Washington, D.C., following a lengthy illness, at the age of 84.

Political offices
Preceded by Edgar A. McCulloch; Charles H. March; William Augustus Ayres; William Augustus Ayres; William Augustus Ayres	Chairmen of the Federal Trade Commission; 1930–1930; 1934–1934; 1938–1938; 1943–1943; 1947–1947	Succeeded by Charles W. Hunt; Ewin L. Davis; Robert E. Freer; Robert E. Freer; Robert E. Freer
