= Madisonville, Cincinnati =

Coordinates: 39°09′38″N 84°23′35″W

Madisonville
- Neighborhood of Cincinnati
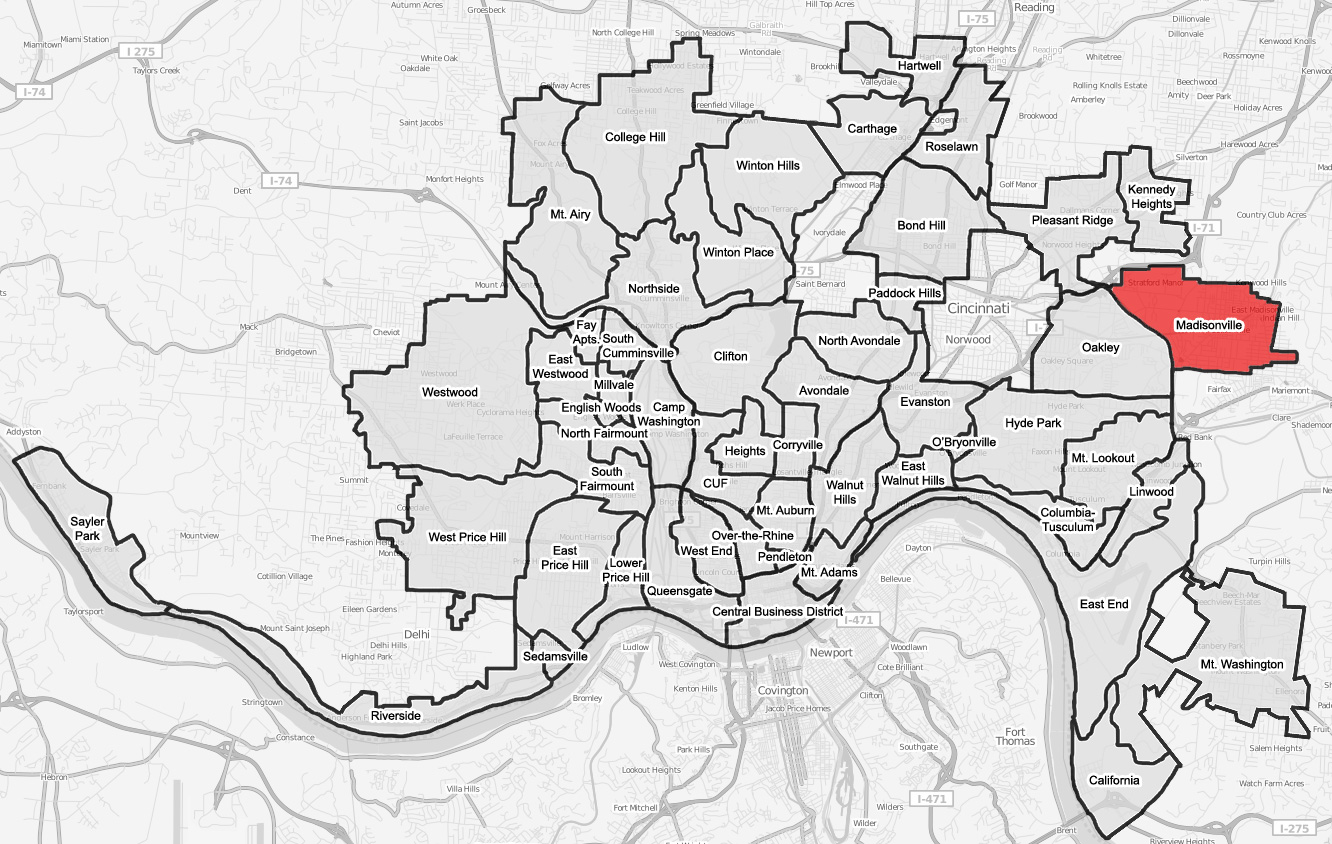
- Country: United States
- State: Ohio
- City: Cincinnati

Population (2020)
  - Total: 17,898
- Time zone: UTC-5 (EST)
  - Summer (DST): UTC-4 (EDT)
- ZIP codes: 45214, 45213, 45227, 45243

Madisonville is one of the 52 neighborhoods of Cincinnati, Ohio. Established in 1809 and annexed in 1911, it is located in the northeastern part of the city. The population was 17,898 at the 2020 census.

== History ==
Madisonville was established in 1809 and originally named Madison after the newly elected James Madison, the fourth president of the United States. Prior to 1809, European-American settlers began to arrive in the territory, mostly from the mid-Atlantic and New England states. In 1826, the post office was named Madisonville, in order to avoid confusion with other towns.

The first permanent settler was Joseph Ward, a sixty-five-year-old American Revolutionary War veteran from New Jersey. Joseph and his two sons, Usual and Israel, came overland by horseback intending to settle in the new outpost of Columbia. Joseph's wife, Phebia, and other sons and daughters traveled by flatboat down the Ohio River to reunite at Columbia.

Seeing the flooding at that location, they decided to go up higher and settled in what was to become Madisonville. Joseph and his sons built the first house, a log cabin, in 1797 along a well-known Native American trail near what is now Whetsel and Monning Avenue.

In 1830, the population of the village was 284. In 1900, the population of Madisonville was reported to be 3,140. The City of Cincinnati annexed Madisonville in 1911.

Former slaves established a black neighborhood known as both Dunbar and Corsica Hollow in the western portion of Madisonville in the mid-nineteenth century. The city demolished parts of the Dunbar area of Madisonville in 1970 for the construction of the Red Bank Expressway. The remaining portion of Dunbar was removed and re-zoned for industrial use in 1995.

== Demographics ==
Population of Madisonville 1900-2020
Year	Pop.	±%
1900	2,930	—
1910	5,093	+73.8%
1920	8,025	+57.6%
1930	9,789	+22.0%
1940	11,294	+15.4%
1950	12,807	+13.4%
1960	17,447	+36.2%
1970	17,897	+2.6%
1980	13,157	−26.5%
1990	12,216	−7.2%
2000	10,827	−11.4%
2010	9,141	−15.6%
2020	17,898	+95.8%

As of the census of 2020, there were 17,898 people living in the neighborhood. There were 8,569 housing units. The racial makeup of the neighborhood was 64.3% White, 25.6% Black or African American, 0.2% Native American, 3.1% Asian, 0.1% Pacific Islander, 1.3% from some other race, and 5.6% from two or more races. 3.0% of the population were Hispanic or Latino of any race.

There were 8,366 households, out of which 54.3% were families. 37.6% of all households were made up of individuals.

18.1% of the neighborhood's population were under the age of 18, 61.5% were 18 to 64, and 20.4% were 65 years of age or older. 48.9% of the population were male and 51.1% were female.

According to the U.S. Census American Community Survey, for the period 2016–2020 the estimated median annual income for a household in the neighborhood was $74,910. About 6.3% of family households were living below the poverty line. About 49.2% had a bachelor's degree or higher.

== Notable people ==
- Irving Babbitt, academic and literary critic
- Alexander Duncan, physician and politician
- Robert E. Freer, attorney
- Richard Hague, poet and writer
- Ethel Glenn Hier, composer, teacher and pianist
