= William E. Humphrey =

American politician (1862–1934)

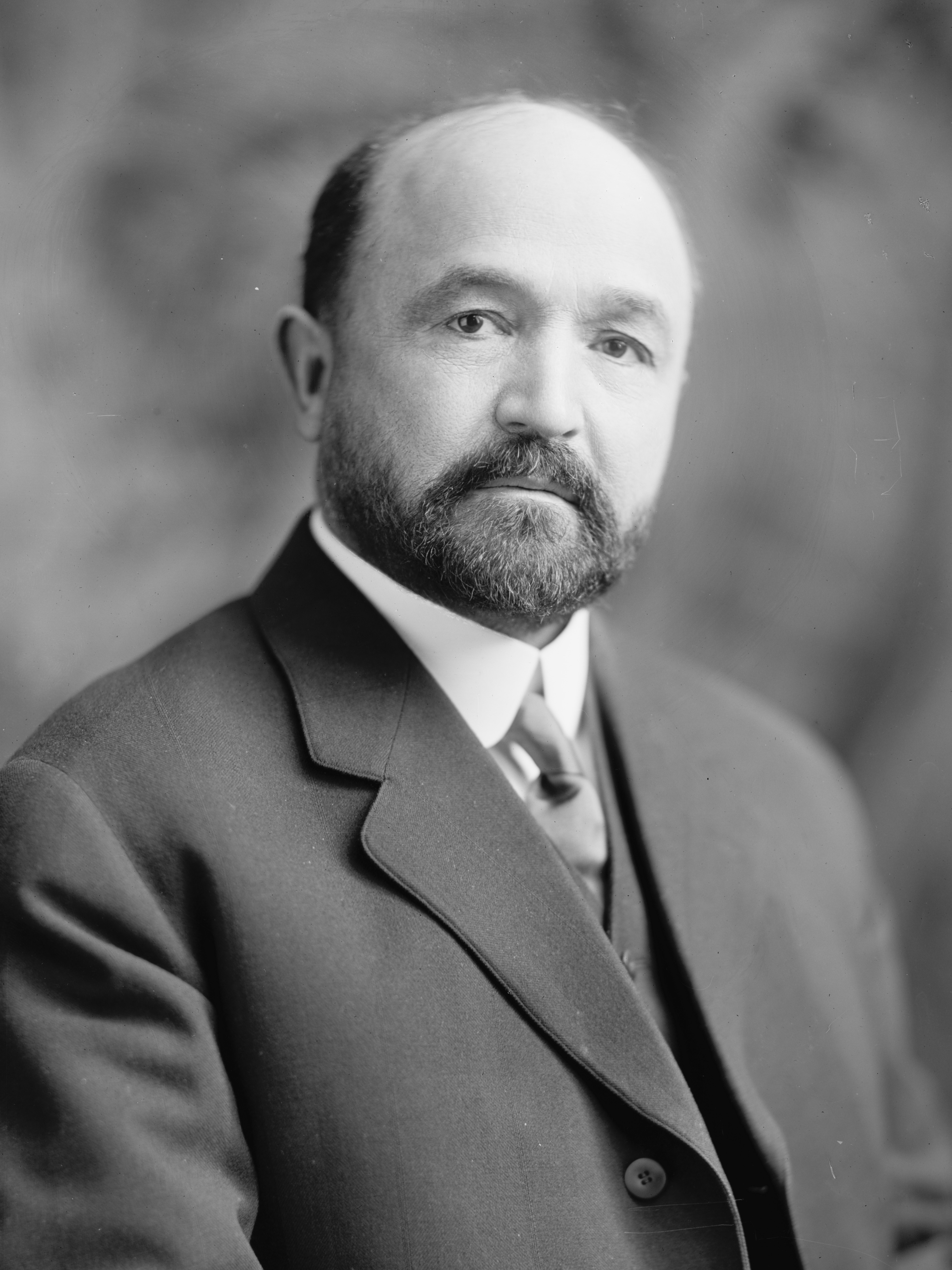
- Humphrey, 1905–1934

Chair of the Federal Trade Commission
- In office February 1, 1932 – December 31, 1932
- President: Herbert Hoover
- Preceded by: Charles W. Hunt
- Succeeded by: Charles H. March
- In office December 1, 1927 – November 30, 1928
- President: Calvin Coolidge
- Preceded by: Charles W. Hunt
- Succeeded by: Abram F. Myers

Member of the Federal Trade Commission
- In office February 25, 1925 – October 7, 1933
- President: Calvin Coolidge; Herbert Hoover; Franklin D. Roosevelt
- Preceded by: Nelson B. Gaskill
- Succeeded by: George C. Mathews

Member of the U.S. House of Representatives from Washington
- In office March 4, 1903 – March 3, 1917
- Preceded by: District established
- Succeeded by: John Franklin Miller
- Constituency: At-large district (1903–1909); 1st district (1909–1917)

Personal details
- Born: William Ewart Humphrey; March 31, 1862 Alamo, Indiana, U.S.
- Died: February 14, 1934 (aged 71) Washington, D.C., U.S.
- Party: Republican
- Education: Wabash College (BA)

William Ewart Humphrey (March 31, 1862 – February 14, 1934) was an American politician who served as a member of the United States House of Representatives from 1903 to 1917. He represented the state of Washington at large from 1903 to 1909 and the state's 1st congressional district from 1909 to 1917. Humphrey also served as a member of the Federal Trade Commission from 1925 to 1933.

== Biography ==
Humphrey was born near Alamo, Indiana, and attended local common schools. He graduated from Wabash College in 1887 and then went on to study law. Humphrey was admitted to the Indiana State Bar in 1887, and started a practice in Crawfordsville, Indiana. When the economic Panic of 1893 struck, he moved to Seattle, Washington, continuing to practice law.

Humphrey was elected as a Republican to fill Washington's new third seat in the House of Representatives in 1902. He was re-elected in 1904 and 1906 to this position. The seat was elected by the state at large until the election of 1908, when the three seats were divided into congressional districts. Humphrey's seat became the First Congressional District of Washington, with Humphrey winning the first election to the new District in 1908 and re-election in 1910, 1912, and 1914. He ran unsuccessfully for the Senate in 1916, which marked the end of his congressional career.

President Calvin Coolidge appointed Humphrey as a member of the Federal Trade Commission (FTC) in 1925, and he was reappointed for another six-year term in 1931. Because of policy disagreements, Humphrey was dismissed from the FTC by President Franklin D. Roosevelt in 1933. Humphrey, however, refused to recognize his dismissal, and brought a lawsuit in the United States Court of Claims to seek compensation for his continued employment, and legal questions from the lawsuit went (posthumously) before the United States Supreme Court in Humphrey's Executor v. United States, 295 U.S. 602 (1935), in which the Court ruled that Roosevelt's decision to terminate Humphrey violated an express limitation on presidential power set forth by Congress in the Federal Trade Commission Act.

Humphrey died from a hemorrhagic stroke in Washington, D.C., on February 14, 1934.

U.S. House of Representatives
New seat	Member of the U.S. House of Representatives from Washington's at-large congressional district 1903–1909	Seat abolished
New constituency	Member of the U.S. House of Representatives from Washington's 1st congressional district 1909–1917	Succeeded by John Miller
Political offices
Preceded by Charles Hunt	Chair of the Federal Trade Commission; 1927–1928	Succeeded by Abram F. Myers
Preceded by Charles Hunt	Chair of the Federal Trade Commission; 1932	Succeeded by Charles H. March
