= Edgar A. McCulloch =

American judge (1861–1933)

Chair of the Federal Trade Commission
- In office January 16, 1929 – November 30, 1929
- President: Calvin Coolidge; Herbert Hoover
- Preceded by: Abram F. Myers
- Succeeded by: Garland Ferguson Jr.

Personal details
- Born: Edgar Allen McCulloch; August 1, 1861 Trenton, Tennessee, U.S.
- Died: January 23, 1933 (aged 71)
- Party: Democratic

Edgar Allen McCulloch (August 1, 1861 – January 23, 1933) was an American judge who served as an associate justice of the Supreme Court of Arkansas from 1904 to 1909, Chief Justice from 1909 to 1927, and a member of the Federal Trade Commission from 1927 to 1933.

Born in Trenton, Tennessee, McCulloch gained admission to the bar in Marianna, Arkansas in 1883.

He was elected to the Arkansas Supreme Court in 1904 and served for 18 years, resigning in 1927 to accept an appointment from President Calvin Coolidge to the Federal Trade Commission. He was chairman of that body from January 16, 1929, to November 30, 1929.

A month after receiving surgery to overcome a long stomach illness, he died from an apparent coronary thrombosis.

Political offices
Preceded by Simon Pollard Hughes Jr.	Justice of the Arkansas Supreme Court; 1904–1909	Succeeded by Samuel Frauenthal
Preceded by Joseph Morrison Hill	Chief Justice of the Arkansas Supreme Court; 1909–1927	Succeeded by Jesse C. Hart
