= Joseph M. Hill =

American judge

Joseph Morrison Hill

Chief Justice of the Arkansas Supreme Court
- In office 1904 – February 2, 1909
- Preceded by: Henry G. Bunn
- Succeeded by: Edgar A. McCulloch

Personal details
- Born: September 2, 1864 Davidson, North Carolina
- Died: July 23, 1950 (aged 85)
- Spouse: Kate Reynolds
- Children: 2
- Relatives: Daniel H. Hill (father)
- Education: University of Arkansas; Cumberland University

Joseph Morrison Hill (September 2, 1864 – July 23, 1950) was an American lawyer who served as chief justice of the Arkansas Supreme Court from 1904 to 1909.

== Biography ==
The youngest son of Confederate Lieutenant General Daniel Harvey Hill and Isabella Morrison Hill, Joseph Hill received his law degree from Cumberland University in 1883.

Hill opened a law practice in Eureka Springs, Arkansas, moving to Fort Smith, Arkansas in 1887. He was elected Chief Justice of the Arkansas Supreme Court in 1904, and served until 1909 when he resigned to become the state's chief attorney in a railroad rate lawsuit. He died in Booneville, Arkansas.
