= Daniel Harvey Hill =

Confederate Army general (1821–1889)

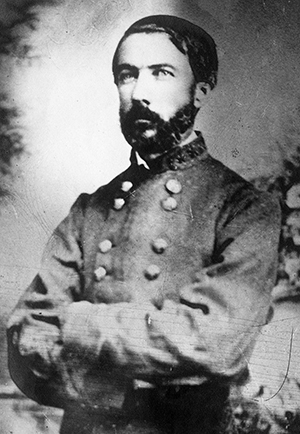
- Hill in uniform, c. 1862
- Born: July 12, 1821; York District, South Carolina, U.S.
- Died: September 24, 1889 (aged 68); Charlotte, North Carolina, U.S.
- Burial place: Davidson College Cemetery, Davidson, North Carolina, U.S.
- Military career
- Allegiance: United States; Confederate States
- Branch: United States Army; Confederate States Army
- Service years: 1842–1849 (U.S.); 1861–1865 (C.S.)
- Rank: Brevet Major (USA); Lieutenant General (CSA)
- Commands: 1st North Carolina Infantry; Hill's Division; Second Corps, Army of Tennessee
- Battles: Mexican–American War; Battle of Contreras; Battle of Churubusco; Battle of Chapultepec; American Civil War; Battle of Big Bethel; Battle of Seven Pines; Seven Days Battles; Battle of South Mountain; Battle of Antietam; Battle of Fredericksburg; Gettysburg campaign; Battle of Chickamauga; Battle of Bentonville
- Other work: Editor; university president

Daniel Harvey Hill (July 12, 1821 – September 24, 1889), commonly known as D. H. Hill, was a Confederate general who commanded infantry in the Eastern and Western theaters of the American Civil War.

Hill was known as an aggressive leader, severely strict, deeply religious, and having a dry, sarcastic humor. He was brother-in-law to Stonewall Jackson and a close friend to James Longstreet and Joseph E. Johnston, but disagreements with both Robert E. Lee and Braxton Bragg cost him favor with Confederate President Jefferson Davis. Although his military ability was well respected, Hill was underused by the end of the American Civil War because of these political feuds.

== Early life and education ==
Daniel Harvey Hill was born at Hill's Iron Works in York District, South Carolina to Solomon and Nancy Cabeen Hill. His paternal grandfather, William Hill, was an Ulster Scot native of Belfast, Ireland, who had an iron foundry in York District where he made cannons for the Continental Army. His maternal grandfather was a native of Scotland.

Hill graduated from the United States Military Academy in 1842, ranking 28th out of 56 cadets, and was appointed to the 1st United States Artillery as a brevet 2nd Lieutenant. He was transferred to the 3rd Artillery on October 20, 1843. Hill was promoted to 2nd Lieutenant on October 13, 1845, in the 4th Artillery Regiment. He was promoted to 1st Lieutenant on March 3, 1847. As his regiment served as infantry, he distinguished himself in the Mexican–American War, being brevetted to captain for bravery at the Battle of Contreras and Battle of Churubusco, and brevetted to major for bravery at the Battle of Chapultepec. Among the people enslaved by the Hill family during Daniel Harvey's youth was Elias Hill. Daniel Harvey helped teach Elias to read and write. As a freedman after the war, Elias Hill became a preacher and led his congregation in emigrating to Liberia after the Ku Klux Klan terrorized his neighborhood.

In February 1849, Daniel Harvey Hill resigned his commission and became a professor of mathematics at Washington College (now Washington and Lee University), in Lexington, Virginia. While living in Lexington, he wrote a college textbook for the Southern United States market, Elements of Algebra, which "with quiet, sardonic humor, points a finger of ridicule or scorn at any and everything Northern." While not all of the textbook's questions were "anti-Yankee", many were, such as:

The field of battle at Buena Vista is 6½ miles from Saltillo. Two Indiana volunteers ran away from the field of battle at the same time; one ran half a mile per hour faster than the other, and reached Saltillo 5 minutes and 54 6/11 seconds sooner than the other. Required their respective rates of travel. Ans. 6, and 5½ miles per hour. (Elements of Algebra, page 322.)

A man in Cincinnati purchased 10,000 pounds of bad pork, at 1 cent per pound, and paid so much per pound to put it through a chemical process, by which it would appear sound, and then sold it at an advanced price, clearing $450 by the fraud. The price at which he sold the pork per pound, multiplied by the cost per pound of the chemical process, was 3 cents. Required the price at which he sold it, and the cost of the chemical process. Ans. He sold it at 6 cents per pound, and the cost of the process was ½ cent per pound. (Elements of Algebra, page 321.)

In the year 1692, the people of Massachusetts executed, imprisoned, or privately persecuted 469 persons, of both sexes, and all ages, for alleged crime of witchcraft. Of these, twice as many were privately persecuted as were imprisoned, and 7 17/19 times as many more were imprisoned than were executed. Required the number of sufferers of each kind? Answer. 19 executed, 150 imprisoned, and 300 privately persecuted.

At the Women's Rights Convention, held at Syracuse, New York, composed of 150 delegates, the old maids, childless-wives, and bedlamites were to each other as the number 5, 7, and 3. How many were there of each class? Answer. 50, 70, and 30.

By contrast, "Southerners in his problems invariably appear in a favorable light".

A gentleman in Richmond expressed a willingness to liberate his slave, valued at $1000, upon the receipt of that sum from charitable persons. He received contributions from 24 persons; and of these there were 14/19ths fewer from the North than the South, and the average donation of the former was 4/5ths smaller than that of the latter. What was the entire amount given by the latter? Answer. $50 by the former; $950 by the latter.

In 1854, Hill joined the faculty of Davidson College in North Carolina. In 1859, he was appointed superintendent of the North Carolina Military Institute in Charlotte.

== American Civil War ==
At the outbreak of the American Civil War, Hill became a colonel of the 1st North Carolina Infantry Regiment, the "Bethel Regiment", at the head of which he won the Battle of Big Bethel, near Fort Monroe, Virginia, on June 10, 1861. Shortly after this, on July 10, 1861, he was promoted to brigadier general and commanded troops in the Richmond area. By the spring of 1862, he was a major general and division commander in the Army of Northern Virginia. He participated in the Yorktown and Williamsburg operations that started the Peninsula Campaign in the spring of 1862, and as a major general, led a division with great distinction in the Battle of Seven Pines and the Seven Days Battles. While the rest of the army went north, Hill's division was left in the Richmond area and did not participate in the Northern Virginia Campaign.

On July 22, 1862, Hill and U.S. Major General John Adams Dix agreed to the general exchange of prisoners between the United States and Confederate armies, known as the Dix–Hill Cartel. This established a scale of equivalents, where an officer would be exchanged for a fixed number of enlisted men, and also allowed for the parole of prisoners, who would undertake not to serve in a military capacity until officially exchanged. (The cartel worked well for a few months but broke down when Confederates insisted on treating black prisoners of war as fugitive slaves and returning them to their previous owners.)

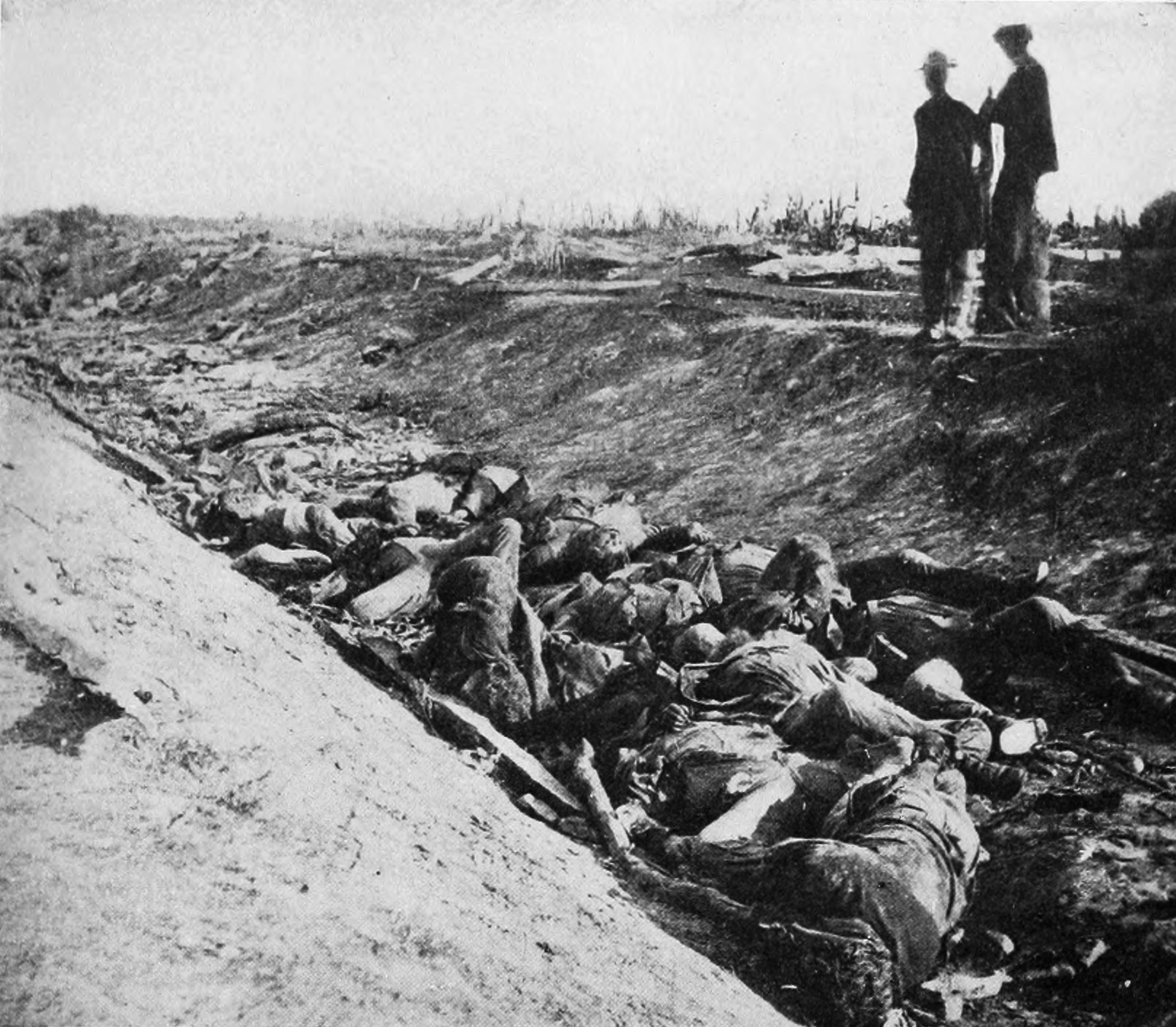
"Bloody Lane" in the sunken road after the Battle of Antietam, 1862. Hill's Confederate troops received multiple assaults and an enfilading fire from several U.S. divisions leaving this bloody scene.

In the Maryland Campaign of 1862, Hill's men fought at the Battle of South Mountain. Scattered as far north as Boonsboro, Maryland when the fighting began, the division fought tooth and nail, buying Lee's army enough time to concentrate at nearby Sharpsburg. Hill's division saw fierce action in the infamous sunken road ("Bloody Lane") at the Battle of Antietam, and he rallied a few detached men from different brigades to hold the line at the critical moment. The Confederate defeat was largely due to the interception by McClellan of Special Order 191 from Lee to his generals, revealing the movements of his widely separated divisions. Some have claimed that Hill received two copies of this order, of which one went astray. But Hill said he received only one copy.

Hill's division was largely unengaged at the Battle of Fredericksburg. At this point, conflicts with Lee began to surface. Hill was not appointed to a corps command on the reorganization of the Army of Northern Virginia after Stonewall Jackson's death. He had already been detached from Lee's Army and sent to his home state to recruit troops. He led Confederate reserve troops protecting Richmond during the Gettysburg campaign. In late June, he successfully resisted a half-hearted advance by U.S. forces under John Adams Dix and Erasmus Keyes.

In 1863, he was sent to General Braxton Bragg's newly reorganized Army of Tennessee, with a promotion to lieutenant general, to command one of its corps. Hill had served under Bragg in Mexico and was initially pleased to be reunited with an old friend, but the warm feelings did not last long. Hill's forces saw some of the heaviest fighting in the bloody and confused Battle of Chickamauga. Afterward, Hill joined several other generals openly condemning Bragg's failure to exploit the victory. President of the Confederate States Jefferson Davis personally came to resolve this dispute in Bragg's favor and to the detriment of those unhappy generals. The Army of Tennessee was reorganized again, and Hill was left without a command. Davis then refused to forward Hill's appointment to the Confederate Senate, and he reverted to major general. Because of this, Hill saw less fighting throughout the remainder of the war.

After that, Hill commanded as a volunteer in smaller actions away from the major armies. Hill participated in the Battle of Bentonville in North Carolina, the last fight of the Army of Tennessee. Hill was a division commander when he, along with Gen. Joseph E. Johnston, surrendered on April 26, 1865.

== Later life ==
From 1866 to 1869, Hill edited a magazine, The Land We Love, at Charlotte, North Carolina, which dealt with social and historical subjects and had a great influence in the former slave states. In 1877, he became one of the first presidents of the University of Arkansas, a post that he held until 1884, and, in 1885, president of the Military and Agricultural College of Milledgeville, Georgia until August 1889, when he resigned due to failing health. General Hill died at Charlotte the following month and was buried in Davidson College Cemetery.

== Personal life ==
On November 2, 1848, he married Isabella Morrison, who was the daughter of Robert Hall Morrison, a Presbyterian minister and the first president of Davidson College, and through her mother, a niece of North Carolina Governor William Alexander Graham. They would have nine children in all. One son, Daniel Harvey Hill Jr., would serve as president of North Carolina State College (now North Carolina State University). Their youngest son, Joseph Morrison, would preside as the Chief Justice of the Arkansas Supreme Court from 1904 to 1909.

Another military man who would become a Confederate Brigadier General, Rufus Clay Barringer of Kannapolis married Eugenia Morrison in 1854. They had two children, Paul and Anna. Eugenia died of typhoid fever in 1858. In July 1857, Isabella's younger sister, Mary Anna, married Professor Thomas J. Jackson of the Virginia Military Institute. Hill and Jackson, who would later earn the nickname "Stonewall" as a Confederate officer, had crossed paths during the Mexican–American War and later developed a closer friendship when both men lived in Lexington, Virginia in the 1850s. Also in 1857, Jackson endorsed Elements of Algebra as "superior to any other work with which I am acquainted on the same branch of science."

== Selected works ==
- College Discipline: An Inaugural Address Delivered at Davidson College, N.C., on February 28, 1855. [n. p.: n. p.], 1855. 19 p.; 23 cm. OCLC 7195350
- Elements of Algebra. Philadelphia, PA: J.B. Lippincott, [1857], 1859. xii, [13]-507 p. tables 22 cm. OCLC 19591232 Elements of Algebra by Maj. D. H. Hill. Google Books pdf of the complete 1857 edition.
- A Consideration of the Sermon on the Mount. Philadelphia, PA: W. S. & A. Martien, 1858, 1859. 3 p.l., [5]-282 p. 19 cm. OCLC 7195011 e-Book version Ann Arbor, Mich.: Making of America, 2000. OCLC 612157953
- The Crucifixion of Christ. Philadelphia, PA: W.S. & A. Martien, 1859. 345 p. 20 cm. OCLC 4392161
- Remarks of Major D. H. Hill of the N.C. Military Institute at Charlotte, before the Committee on Education of the North Carolina Legislature. [North Carolina: n. p., 1860?]. 1 sheet ([1] p.); 49 x 30 cm. OCLC 41374540
- Gen. Hill founded and edited The Land We Love: A Monthly Magazine Devoted to Literature, Military History, and Agriculture. 6 vols. Charlotte, NC: J.P. Irwin & D. H. Hill, 1866–1869. Sabin No. 38821. This magazine merged with The New Eclectic Magazine of Baltimore, MD. Subsequently, it was called The Southern Magazine. OCLC 752793193 OCLC Record Containing Contents List for Issues of The Land We Love.
- The Old South: An Address Delivered by Lieutenant-General D. H. Hill, at Ford's Grand Opera House, on Memorial Day, June 6, 1887, before the Society of the Army and Navy of the Confederate States in the State of Maryland. Baltimore, MD: Andrew J. Conlon, 1887. 23 p.; 23 cm. OCLC 5315299

== See also ==
- List of Confederate States Army generals
