= Sumner Pike =

American government official (1891–1976)

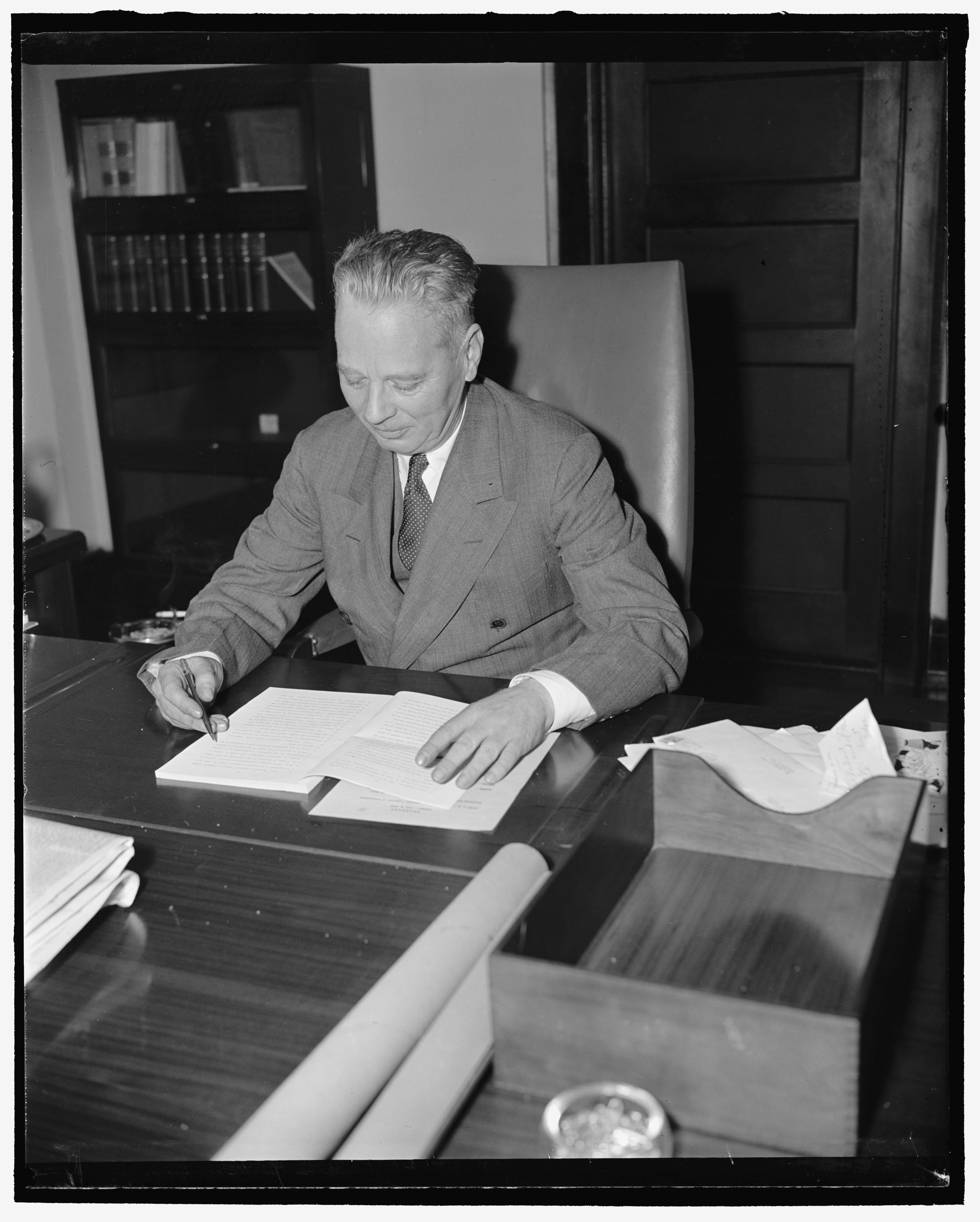
- Pike in 1937

Member of the Maine House of Representatives from Lubec
- In office January 7, 1959 – January 1, 1969
- Preceded by: Sherman Denbow
- Succeeded by: John A. Donaghy

Member of the United States Atomic Energy Commission
- In office October 1946 – December 15, 1951
- President: Harry S. Truman
- Preceded by: None (office created)
- Succeeded by: Eugene M. Zuckert

Member of the U.S. Securities and Exchange Commission
- In office June 4, 1940 – April 30, 1946
- President: Franklin D. Roosevelt; Harry S. Truman
- Preceded by: George C. Mathews
- Succeeded by: Richard B. McEntire

Personal details
- Born: Sumner Tucker Pike; February 22, 1891 Lubec, Maine, U.S.
- Died: February 21, 1976 (aged 84) Lubec, Maine, U.S.
- Party: Republican
- Education: Bowdoin College (BA)

Military service
- Allegiance: United States
- Branch/service: United States Army
- Years of service: 1917–1919
- Rank: Captain
- Unit: Coast Artillery Corps
- Battles/wars: World War I

Sumner Tucker Pike (August 30, 1891 – February 21, 1976) was an American politician and government official who was a member of the U.S. Securities and Exchange Commission from 1940 to 1946 and a member of the Atomic Energy Commission (AEC) from 1946 to 1951, serving as acting chairman of the AEC during 1950.

== Early life and education ==
Pike grew up in Lubec, Maine, a small fishing village in the northeastern portion of the state. He was a Bowdoin College graduate, in the year 1913.

== Business career ==
Pike entered the sardines industry and became a self-made millionaire. He then went to Wall Street in 1928 where he became an investment banker. He retired from business in 1939.

== Securities and Exchange Commission ==
After retiring, Pike came to Washington, D.C. and served as an advisor to the U.S. Secretary of Commerce. During World War II he was on the Securities and Exchange Commission and also was in the Office of Price Administration.

== Atomic Energy Commission ==
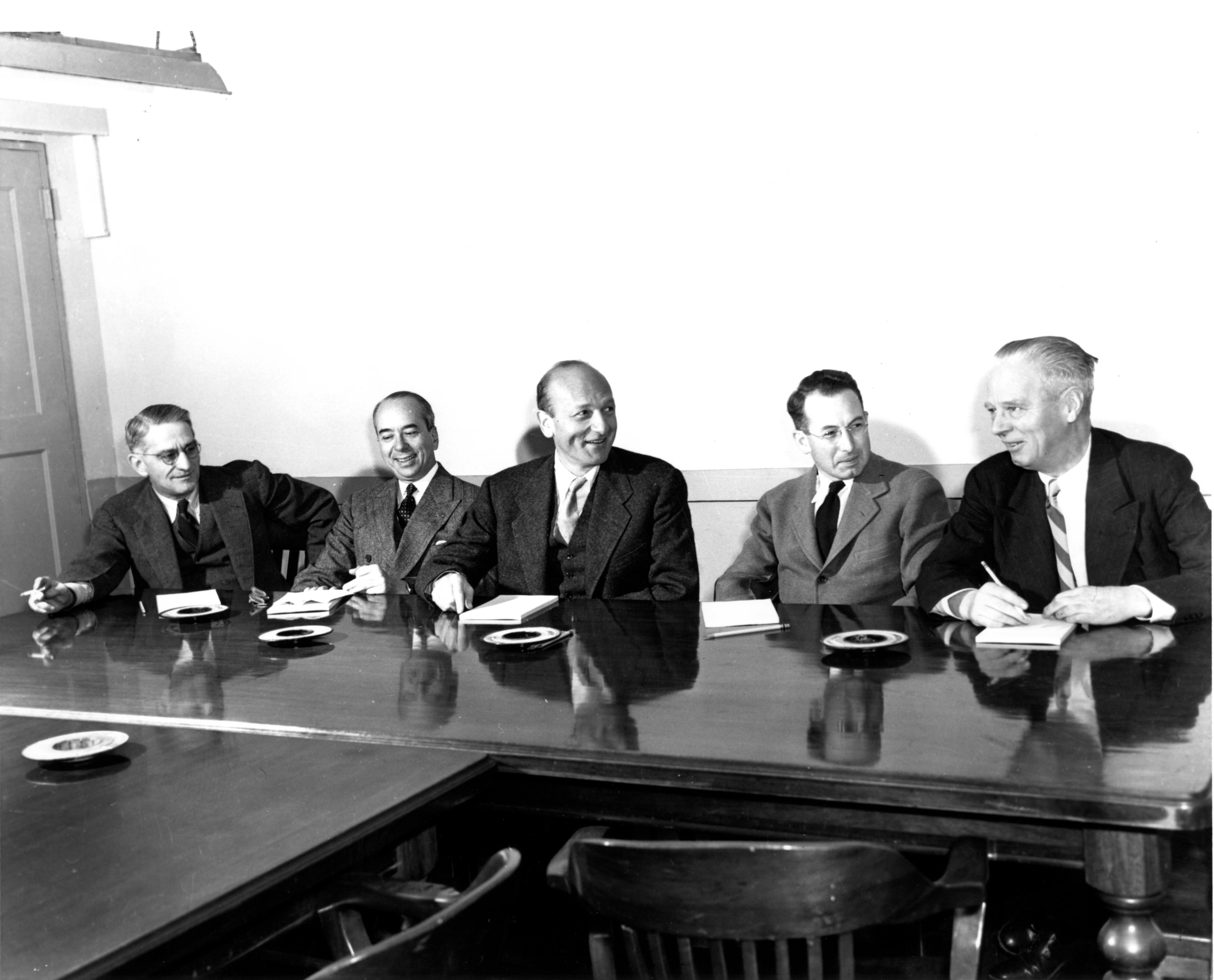
Pike (far right) with the other original members of the AEC, c. 1947

Pike was chosen as one of the five original members of the Atomic Energy Commission created by the Atomic Energy Act of 1946.

The first atomic bomb test by the Soviet Union in August 1949 came earlier than expected by Americans, and over the next several months there was an intense debate within the U.S. government, military, and scientific communities regarding whether to proceed with development of the far more powerful hydrogen bomb, then known as "the Super". In November 1949, Pike joined a 3–2 majority of commissioners in recommending against proceeding with the Super. However, by the time President Harry S. Truman ordered that development of the Super go on, Pike's position had drifted to being in favor of proceeding.

Another issue Pike faced on the AEC was whether to allowed nuclear testing in the United States. In March 1949, he had stated that only a national emergency could justify such testing; but following the onset of the Korean War, it was considered that such an emergency existed and nuclear bomb testing began in Nevada in 1951.

In 1950, the Joint Atomic Energy Committee of Congress voted five to four (with one Democrat joining the four Republicans on the panel) not to approve of President Harry S. Truman's nomination of Pike as chairman of the Atomic Energy Commission, when he was acting as chairman. Instead, though Pike was renominated and approved as a member, Truman picked Gordon Dean as chairman. When Pike resigned from the AEC in December 1951, he was the last of the original five members still on it.

== Maine politician ==
Pike was a member of the Republican Party. When he returned to Maine from Washington, he resisted calls to run for governor but did serve in the legislature.

From 1965 to 1975, Pike was a charter member of the Roosevelt Campobello International Park Commission, which governs Roosevelt Campobello International Park, serving with Sen. Edmund S. Muskie and Franklin Delano Roosevelt Jr.
