= George C. Mathews =

American economist (1886–1946)

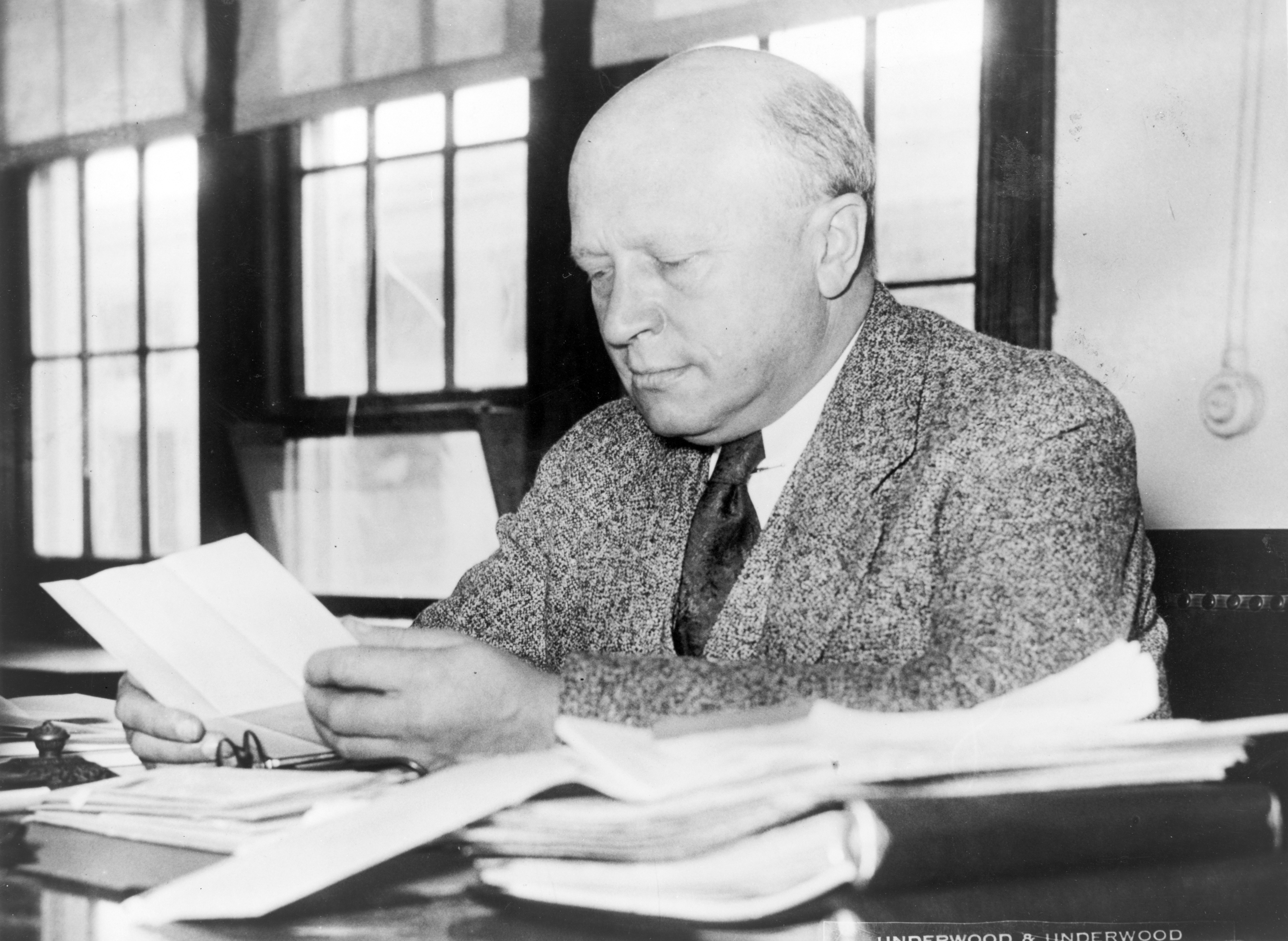

Member of the U.S. Securities and Exchange Commission
- In office July 2, 1934 – April 15, 1940
- President: Franklin D. Roosevelt
- Preceded by: None (office created)
- Succeeded by: Sumner Pike

Member of the Federal Trade Commission
- In office October 27, 1933 – July 2, 1934
- President: Franklin D. Roosevelt
- Preceded by: William E. Humphrey
- Succeeded by: Robert E. Freer

Personal details
- Born: February 22, 1886 Northwood, Iowa, U.S.
- Died: July 11, 1946 (aged 60) Chicago, Illinois, U.S.
- Party: Republican
- Education: University of Wisconsin–Madison

George C. Mathews (February 22, 1886 – July 11, 1946) was an American economist who served as a member of the U.S. Securities and Exchange Commission under Franklin Delano Roosevelt from 1934 to 1940.

== Biography ==
Mathews was born in Northwood, Iowa on February 22, 1886. He received his Bachelor of Arts degree from the University of Wisconsin–Madison in 1908, and served on the faculties of the University of Wisconsin and Oregon State University. He later worked as a rate expert for the Wisconsin Railroad Commission, and was a professor of public utilities at Northwestern University.

A liberal Republican from Wisconsin, Mathews served on the Wisconsin Public Utilities Commission before being appointed by Roosevelt to the Federal Trade Commission on October 27, 1933.

Mathews also served as a vice president of the Northern States Power Company and the Middle West Utilities Company, and executive vice president of the Standard Gas and Electric Company. In 1934, Mathews was appointed as one of the original members of the U.S. Securities and Exchange Commission, and he served until 1940.

He died in Chicago, Illinois on July 11, 1946.
