= Samuel Frauenthal =

American judge (1862–1935)

Associate Justice of the Arkansas Supreme Court
- In office February 1, 1909 – January 1, 1913
- Appointed by: George Donaghey
- Preceded by: Edgar A. McCulloch
- Succeeded by: Frank Smith

Personal details
- Born: August 8, 1862 Louisville, Kentucky, U.S.
- Died: December 4, 1935 (aged 73) Little Rock, Arkansas, U.S.
- Occupation: Lawyer, jurist

Samuel Frauenthal (August 8, 1862 – December 4, 1935) was an American lawyer and judge who served as an associate justice of the Arkansas Supreme Court in the early 20th century.

== Early life, education, and career ==
Born in Louisville, Kentucky, Frauenthal received a B.A. from the local Bethel College, in 1880. There are "conflicting reports about whether he read the law privately or attended law school at the University of Louisville".

He later moved to Arkansas, where he established a legal practice in Conway.

== Judicial service ==
On February 1, 1909, Governor George Washington Donaghey appointed Frauenthal to the Arkansas Supreme Court to fill a vacancy created by the elevation of Edgar A. McCulloch to chief justice.

In a special election held in July 1909, Frauenthal was confirmed in that position and served on the court until January 1, 1913.

With his appointment in 1909, Frauenthal became the first person of the Jewish faith to serve on the Arkansas Supreme Court. During his service on the court, Frauenthal delivered an address upon his appointment that was reported in the Pine Bluff Daily Graphic on February 4, 1909.

After leaving the bench, Frauenthal returned to private legal practice and remained active professionally and in business ventures in Arkansas.

== Personal life and death ==
Frauenthal had a prominent bushy mustache. He died on December 4, 1935, in Little Rock, Arkansas.

An appeal involving his estate was litigated after his death, with the case, United States v. Frauenthal, heard by the United States Court of Appeals for the Eighth Circuit in 1943 concerning estate tax matters.

Political offices
Preceded by Edgar A. McCulloch	Justice of the Arkansas Supreme Court; 1909–1912	Succeeded by Frank G. Smith
