= Frank G. Smith =

American judge (1872–1950)

Frank Grigsby Smith (August 2, 1872 – October 27, 1950) was a justice of the Arkansas Supreme Court from 1912 to 1949.

Born in Marion, Arkansas, Smith gained admission to the bar in Arkansas in 1893. He was elected to the Arkansas House of Representatives in 1894, when he was twenty-two years old, and re-elected in 1896. He was elected to the Arkansas Senate in 1902 and 1904, and to the Arkansas Second Judicial Circuit in 1906. As a state court judge, he was nominated by the Democratic Party for the state supreme court in 1912. Smith won the election, and was re-elected to five subsequent eight-year terms, writing thousands of opinions during his tenure prior to his resignation in 1949.

Smith died in Marion at the age of 78.

Political offices
Preceded by Samuel Frauenthal	Justice of the Arkansas Supreme Court; 1912–1949	Succeeded by Edwin Dunaway
