= Abram F. Myers =

American government official (1889–1960)

Abram F. Myers (1889 – after July 1960) was the chair of the Federal Trade Commission (FTC) from December 1, 1928 to January 15, 1929, and thereafter general counsel and board chairman of the Allied States Association of Motion Picture Exhibitors (ASAMPE) until July 1960.

Born in Fairfield, Iowa, Myers joined the United States Department of Justice in a sub-clerical position, and received a law degree from the Georgetown University Law Center in 1912. He eventually became a senior attorney on the department before receiving a recess appointment to the FTC by President Calvin Coolidge in July 1926. Myers served until 1929, chairing the commission in his final year, when he resigned to serve in his dual roles with ASAMPE, where he was sometimes regarded as "one of the film industry's controversial figures", holding those positions from 1929 until his resignation in July 1960. In 1943, Abrams wrote a review of the 1943 film Deerslayer for the publication Harrison's Reports; as the film was produced by the publisher of this periodical, P. S. Harrison, this was their first review acknowledged not to have been written by Harrison.

Political offices
Preceded by William E. Humphrey	Chairmen of the Federal Trade Commission; 1928–1929	Succeeded by Edgar A. McCulloch
