= Ethel Glenn Hier =

Pianist and composer

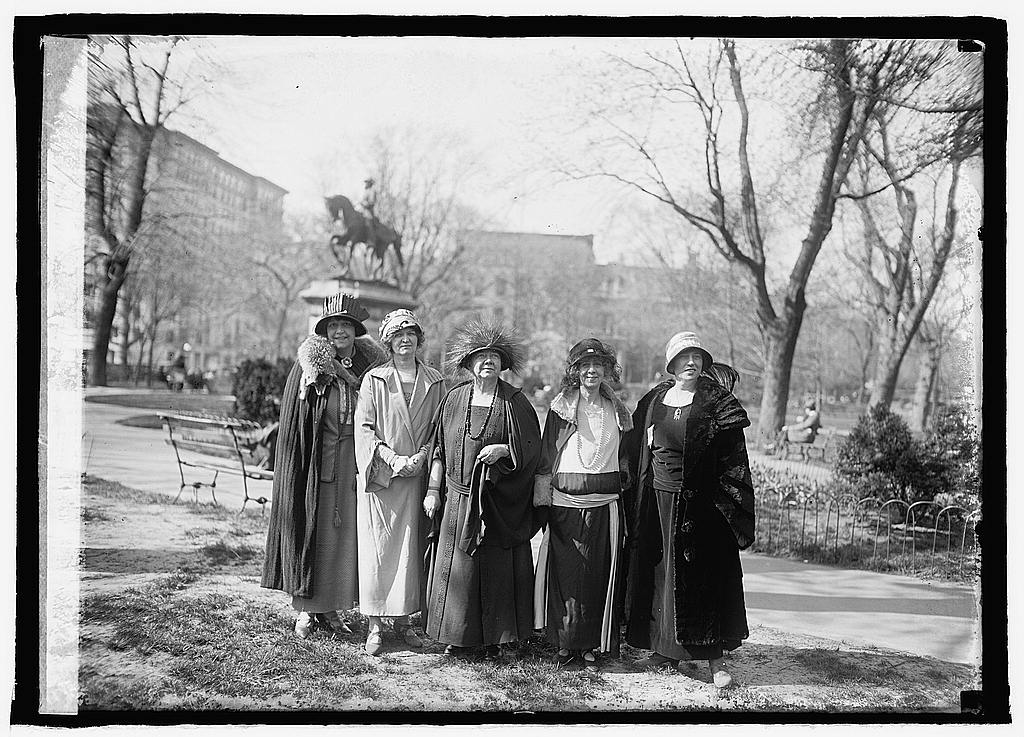
Women composers at the 1924 convention of the League of American Pen Women; Hier is second from the left.

Ethel Glenn Hier (25 June 1889 – 14 January 1971) was an American composer, teacher and pianist of Scottish ancestry.

== Life ==
Ethel Glenn Hier was born in Madisonville, a neighborhood of Cincinnati, Ohio. She studied at Ohio Wesleyan University and the Cincinnati Conservatory of Music, where she graduated in piano in 1908. She continued her education in 1911 with composition classes, and in 1917 entered the Institute of Musical Art (later Juilliard).

After completing her studies, Hier worked as a composer and became a teacher of piano and composition in Cincinnati and then New York. She died in Winter Park, Florida.

== Works ==
Selected works include:

- Carolina suite for orchestra
- Dreamin' town (Text: Paul Laurence Dunbar)
- The bird in the rain (Text: Elinor Wylie)
- The Hour and the Return, song cycle (Text: Sara Teasdale)
- Down in the Glen
- If You Must Go, Go Quickly
