= Charles W. Hunt (politician) =

American politician (1864–1938)

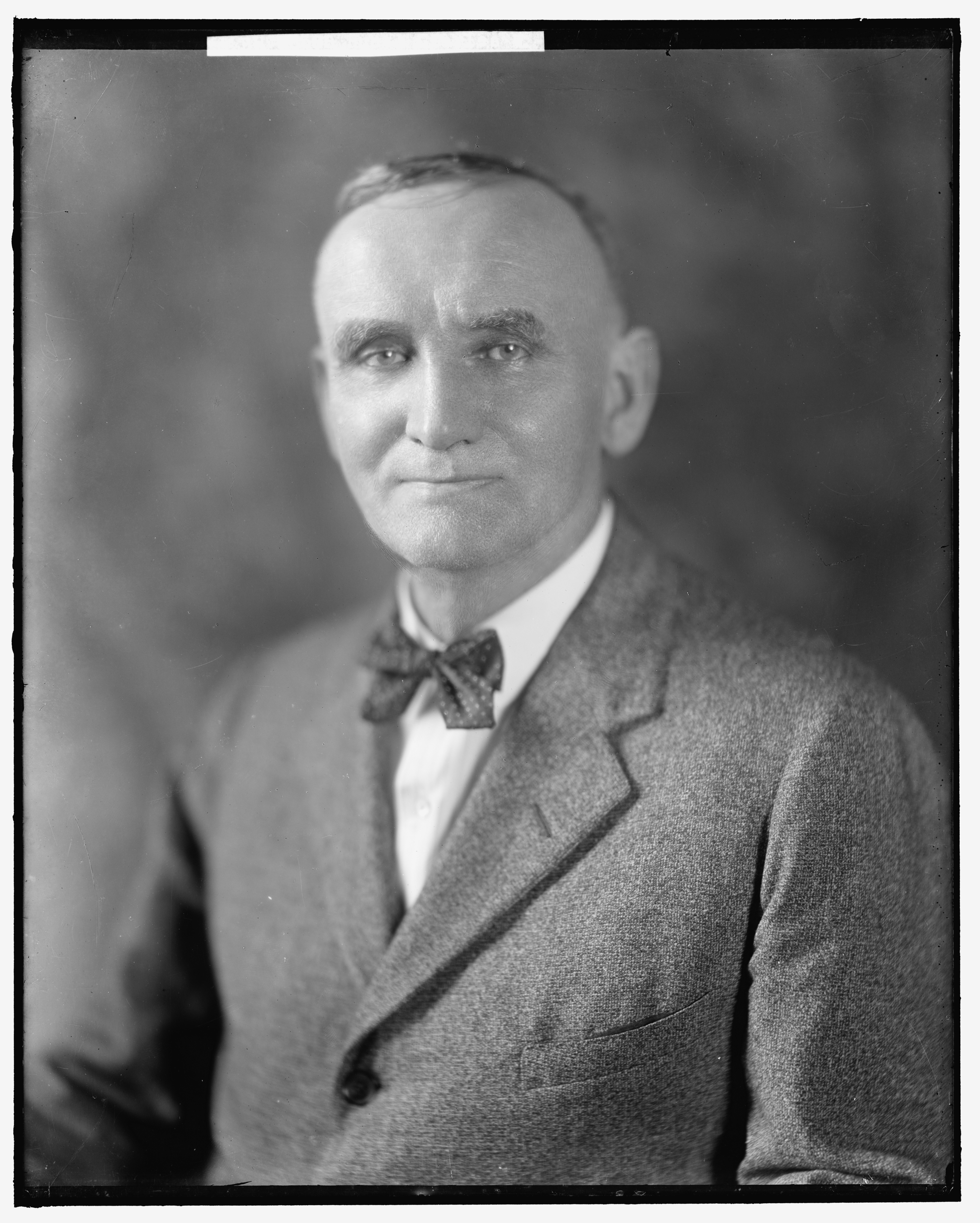
- Hunt, 1905–1938

Chair of the Federal Trade Commission
- In office January 1, 1931 – December 31, 1931
- President: Herbert Hoover
- Preceded by: Garland Ferguson Jr.
- Succeeded by: William E. Humphrey
- In office December 1, 1926 – November 30, 1927
- President: Calvin Coolidge
- Preceded by: John F. Nugent
- Succeeded by: William E. Humphrey

Personal details
- Born: January 2, 1864 Logan, Iowa, U.S.
- Died: August 16, 1938 (aged 74)
- Party: Republican
- Education: Iowa State University

Charles W. Hunt (January 2, 1864 – August 16, 1938) was an American politician who served as the chair of the Federal Trade Commission from December 1, 1926 to November 30, 1927, and again from January 1, 1931 to December 31, 1931.

Born in Logan, Iowa, Hunt received an undergraduate degree from Iowa State University in 1888, and worked for a time as a teacher and a farmer. In 1911, Hunt was elected as a Republican to represent Harrison County, Iowa, in the Thirty-fourth and Thirty-fifth sessions of the Iowa General Assembly, in the Iowa House of Representatives, serving until 1915. He held various other state offices and trade organization positions until 1924, when President Calvin Coolidge appointed Hunt to a seat on the FTC vacated by the resignation of Victor Murdock.

Hunt's reappointment was contested in the Senate, where Senator William H. King of Utah objected, asserting "that Hunt was a reactionary and was not enforcing the law". After several weeks of delay, Hunt was reconfirmed. Hunt retired from the FTC in 1932, and remained in Washington, D.C., until his death, at the age of 74.

Political offices
| Preceded by John F. Nugent; William E. Humphrey | Chairmen of the Federal Trade Commission; 1926–1927; 1931–1931 | Succeeded by Garland S. Ferguson; William E. Humphrey |
