= Charles Wallace Hunt =

American engineer and businessman

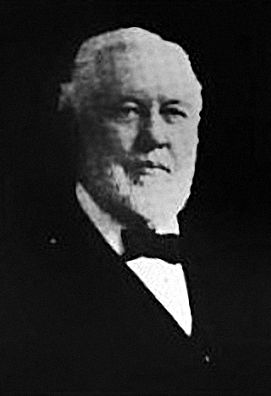
Charles Wallace Hunt

Charles Wallace Hunt (October 13, 1841 – March 27, 1911) was an American mechanical engineer, inventor and business executive, known as president of the American Society of Mechanical Engineers in the year 1898–99.

== Biography ==
Hunt was born at Candor, New York, on October 13, 1841. He came into prominence as founder of the C. W. Hunt Company in West New Brighton in 1871, three years after he had settled in Staten Island and had started a retail coal business.

Hunt was elected president of the American Society of Mechanical Engineers for the year 1898–99, and was elected an Associate of the American Institute of Electrical Engineers in 1902.

He died March 27, 1911, at Richmond County in Staten Island, New York.

== Work ==
=== C.W. Hunt Company ===
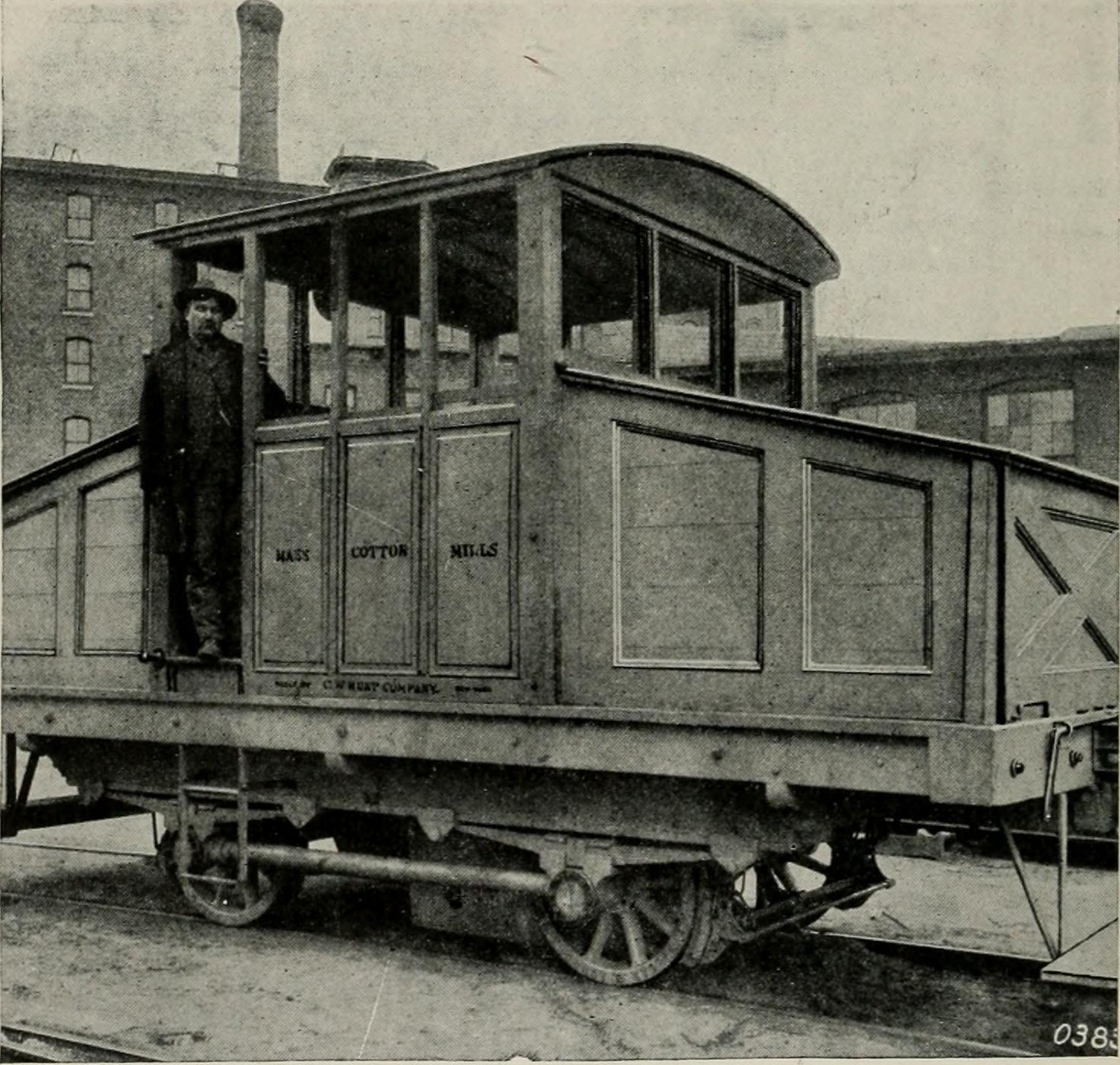
Electric battery locomotive by C.W. Hunt Company

C.W. Hunt Company was a constructive engineering firm located in West New Brighton. The company made coal and ore-handling machinery, and build wharves, docks, storage warehouses, power stations, railways, cranes, etc.

The Robert Pearson Collection (2015) summarized that "although not as well known as other industrial suppliers, the C. W. Hunt Co. offered an amazing assortment of industrial equipment. Established in 1872, the New York based firm supplied rope, coal handling equipment, cranes, and complete industrial railways. The innovative company was purchased by the Yale and Towne Manufacturing in 1920 shortly after C. W. Hunt Co produced a battery powered lift truck."

== Selected publications ==
- Coal Handling Machinery: No. 9306, Published 1893 by C. W. Hunt Company
- Charles Wallace Hunt. American Society of Mechanical Engineers, President's Address 1898: The Engineer, His Work, His Ethics, His Pleasures. American Society of Mechanical Engineers, 1898
- Charles Wallace Hunt. Manila Rope: Transmission and Hoisting, 1912.
- Charles Wallace Hunt. Heat Transmission in Poor Conductors, 1913.

== Selected patents ==
- Patent US708713 - Hoisting apparatus, 1902
- Patent US729868 - Hoisting apparatus, 1902
- Patent US796074 - Coal-chute, 1905
- Patent US1020607 - Motor-truck, 1910
- Patent US1048834 - Conveyer, 1910
