= Garland Sevier Ferguson =

American judge (1843–1924)

Garland Sevier Ferguson Sr. (May 6, 1843 – December 9, 1924) was a farmer, soldier, clerk, lawyer, state senator, and judge in North Carolina. His son Garland S. Ferguson Jr. also became a public official.

He was born in Crabtree, North Carolina. He rose from private to lieutenant in the Confederate Army during the American Civil War, serving in Company F, 25th Infantry, North Carolina. He served in the North Carolina Senate from 1876 to 1877 when five African Americans also served.

His wife's father was killed by Native Americans. He lived in Waynesville and had seven children with his wife Sarah née Norwood Ferguson.

Ferguson died at his home in Waynesville at the age of 81. The county court was adjourned in his honor, and speeches were delivered in eulogy by a number of leading figures in the legal community.
