= Ewin L. Davis =

American politician (1876–1949)

Ewin Lamar Davis
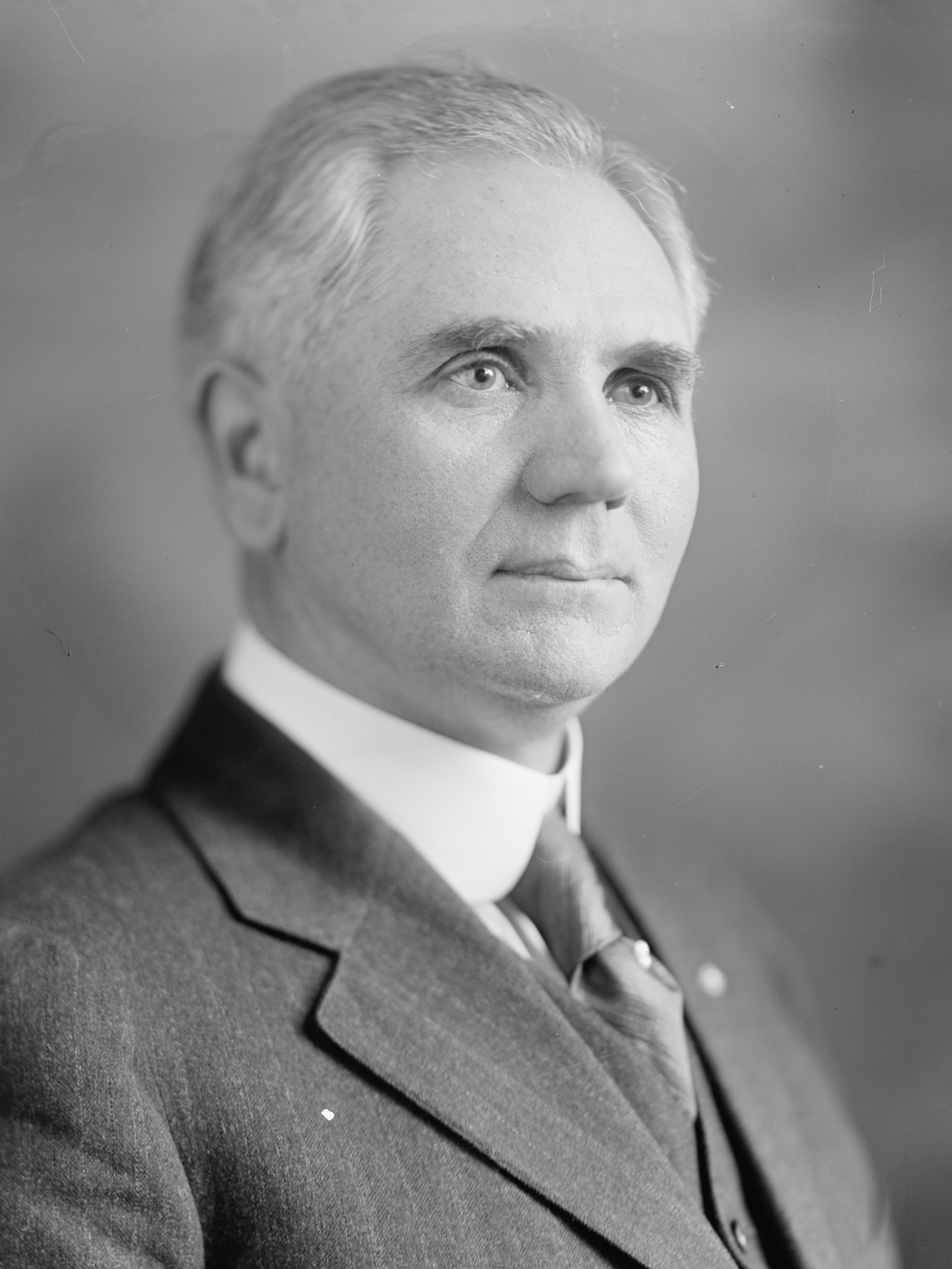
- Harris & Ewing photo, circa 1919

Member of the U.S. House of Representatives from Tennessee's 5th district
- In office March 4, 1919 – March 3, 1933
- Preceded by: William C. Houston
- Succeeded by: Jo Byrns

Personal details
- Born: February 5, 1876 Bedford County, Tennessee, U.S.
- Died: October 23, 1949 (aged 73) Washington, D.C., U.S.
- Citizenship: United States
- Party: Democratic
- Spouse: Carolyn Windsor Davis
- Children: Windsor Davis; Margaret Davis; Ewin Davis; Latham Davis; Carolyn Davis
- Education: Columbian (now The George Washington University Law School)
- Profession: Attorney, politician, judge, banker

Ewin Lamar Davis (February 5, 1876 – October 23, 1949) was an American politician and a member of the United States House of Representatives for the 5th congressional district of Tennessee.

== Biography ==
Davis was born in Bedford County, Tennessee, son of McLin H. and Christina Lee (Shoffner) Davis; and brother of Norman Hezekiah Davis. He attended public schools, including The Webb School in Bell Buckle, Tennessee, and Woolwine School in Tullahoma, Tennessee. From 1895 to 1897 he was a student at Vanderbilt University in Nashville, Tennessee. He married Carolyn Windsor on December 28, 1898, and they had five children, Windsor, Margaret, Ewin, Latham, and Carolyn. He graduated from Columbian (now The George Washington University Law School) in Washington, D.C., in 1899. He was admitted to the bar the same year and commenced practice in Tullahoma, Tennessee.

== Career ==
Davis was a delegate to all state Democratic conventions from 1900 to 1910. From 1910 through 1918, he was a judge of the Seventh Judicial Circuit of Tennessee. He also acted as chairman of the district exemption board for the middle district of Tennessee in 1917 and 1918.

From 1903 to 1940, Davis was the director of the Traders National Bank of Tullahoma, and was a trustee of the Tennessee College for Women from 1906 to 1939. He was also a member of the Federal Trade Commission from May 23, 1933, until his death, serving as chairman in 1935, 1940, and 1945.

Davis was elected as a Democrat to the Sixty-sixth Congress and to the six succeeding Congresses, serving from March 4, 1919, until March 3, 1933. During the Seventy-second Congress he was the chairman of the United States House Committee on Merchant Marine and Fisheries. He was an unsuccessful candidate for renomination in 1932. In 1936, he was a member of the American National Committee of the Third World Power Conference.

Among Davis's legislative acts was the so-called "Davis Amendment" to the Radio Act of 1927. The 1928 reauthorization of the Radio Act included a provision, sponsored by Davis, that required each region of the country to have equal allocations of radio licenses, station power, etc. This greatly complicated things for the Federal Radio Commission, who was in charge of licensing radio stations; they were required to deny station applications to otherwise qualified candidates simply because the new station would put a particular state or region over its quota. For example, the northeast had a greater population than the southwest, but was limited to the same number of stations as more sparsely populated areas. Likewise, many small communities in the southwest could have added a local station without increasing interference (because of their remoteness), but were prevented from doing so by the Davis Amendment. The Davis Amendment was ultimately repealed on June 5, 1936.

== Death ==
Davis died in Washington, D.C., on October 23, 1949 (age 73 years, 260 days) and is interred in Oakwood Cemetery in Tullahoma, Tennessee.

U.S. House of Representatives
Preceded by William C. Houston	Member of the U.S. House of Representatives from Tennessee's 5th congressional district 1919-1933	Succeeded by Jo Byrns
